= Next Portuguese legislative election =

- On or before 14 October 2029

All 230 seats in the Assembly of the Republic 116 seats needed for a majority
- Opinion polls
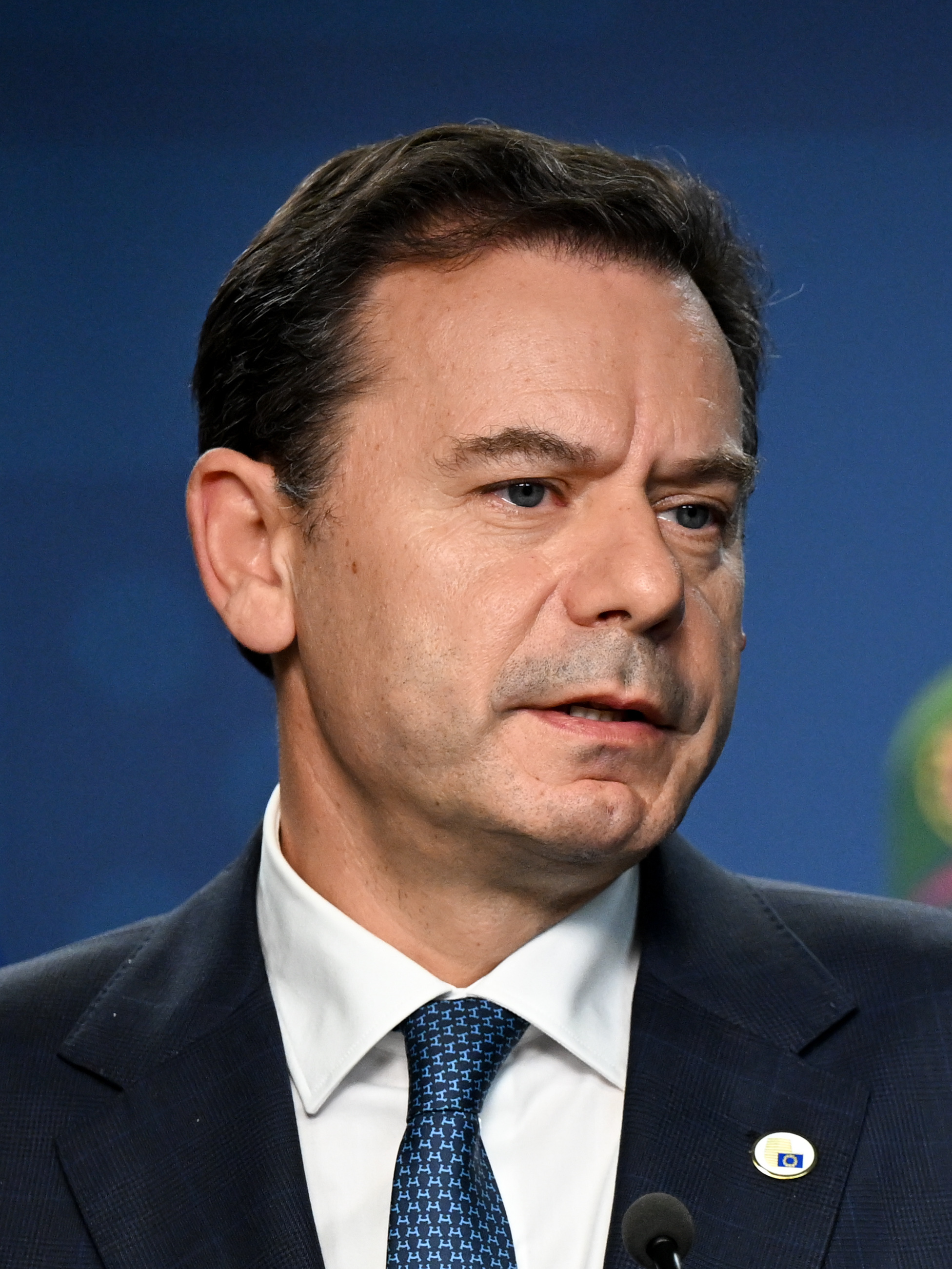

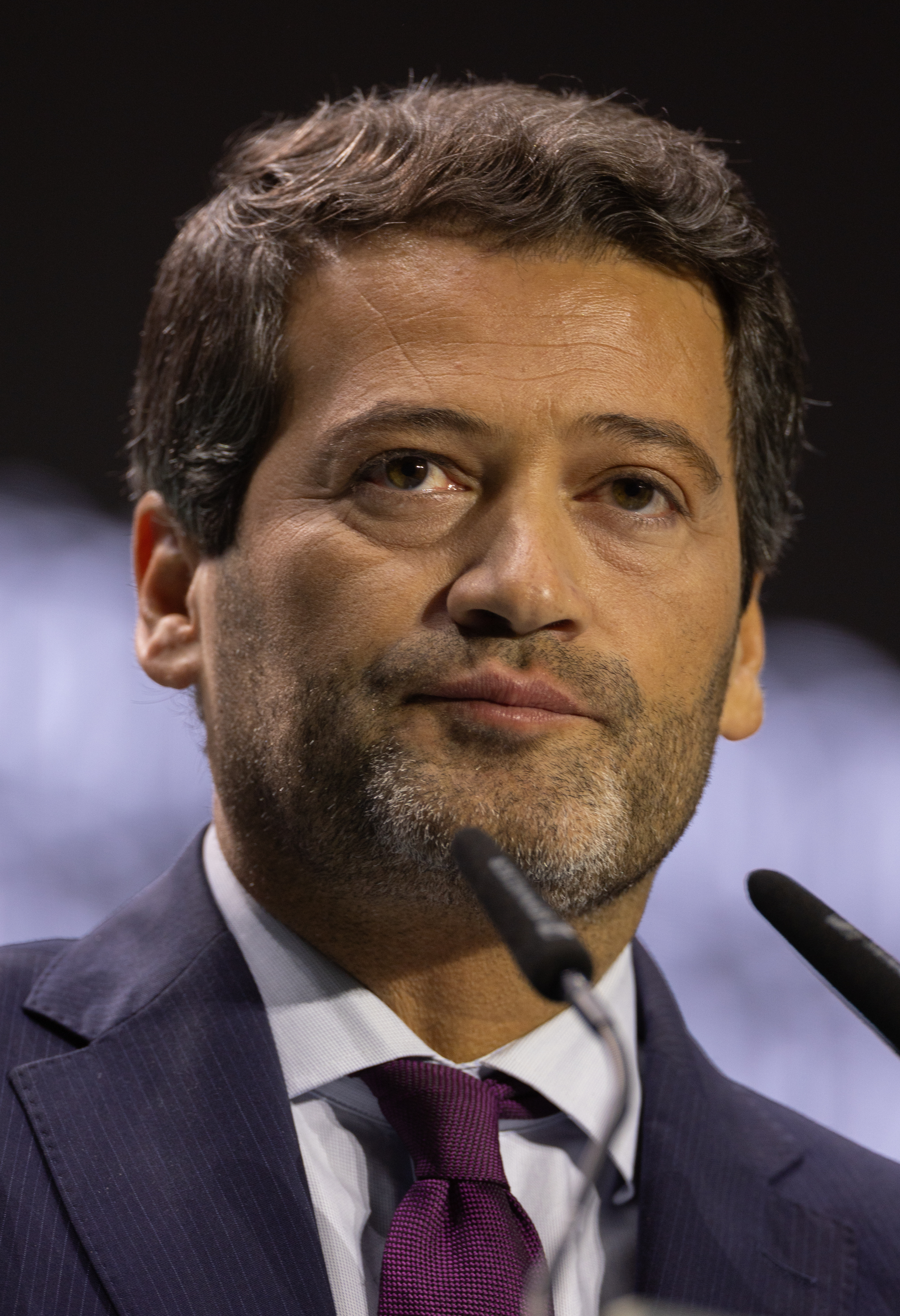

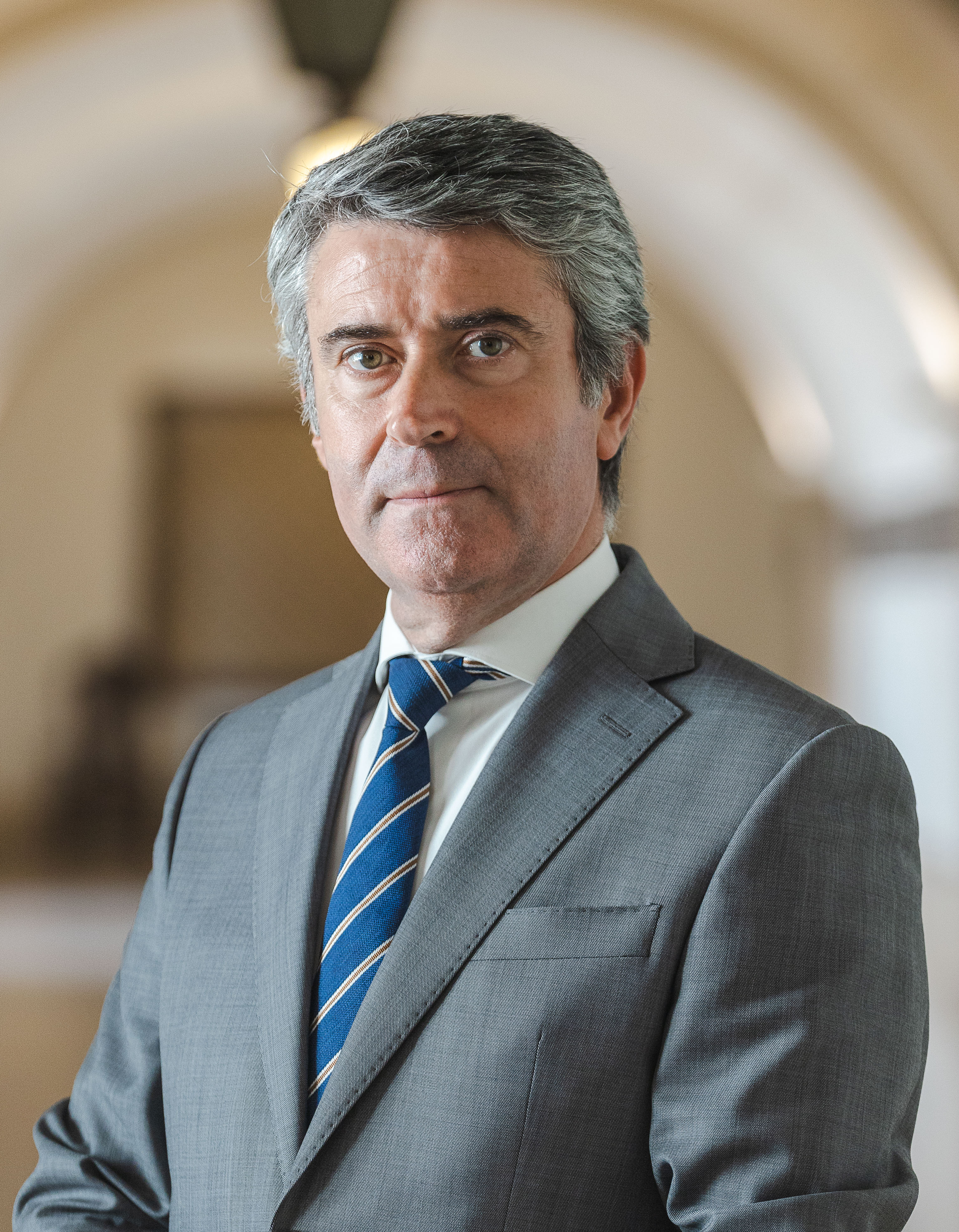

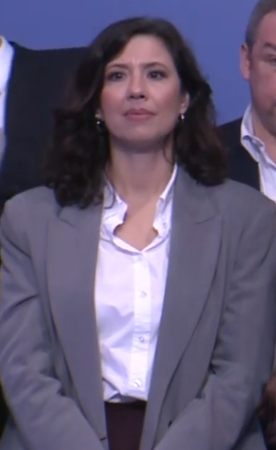

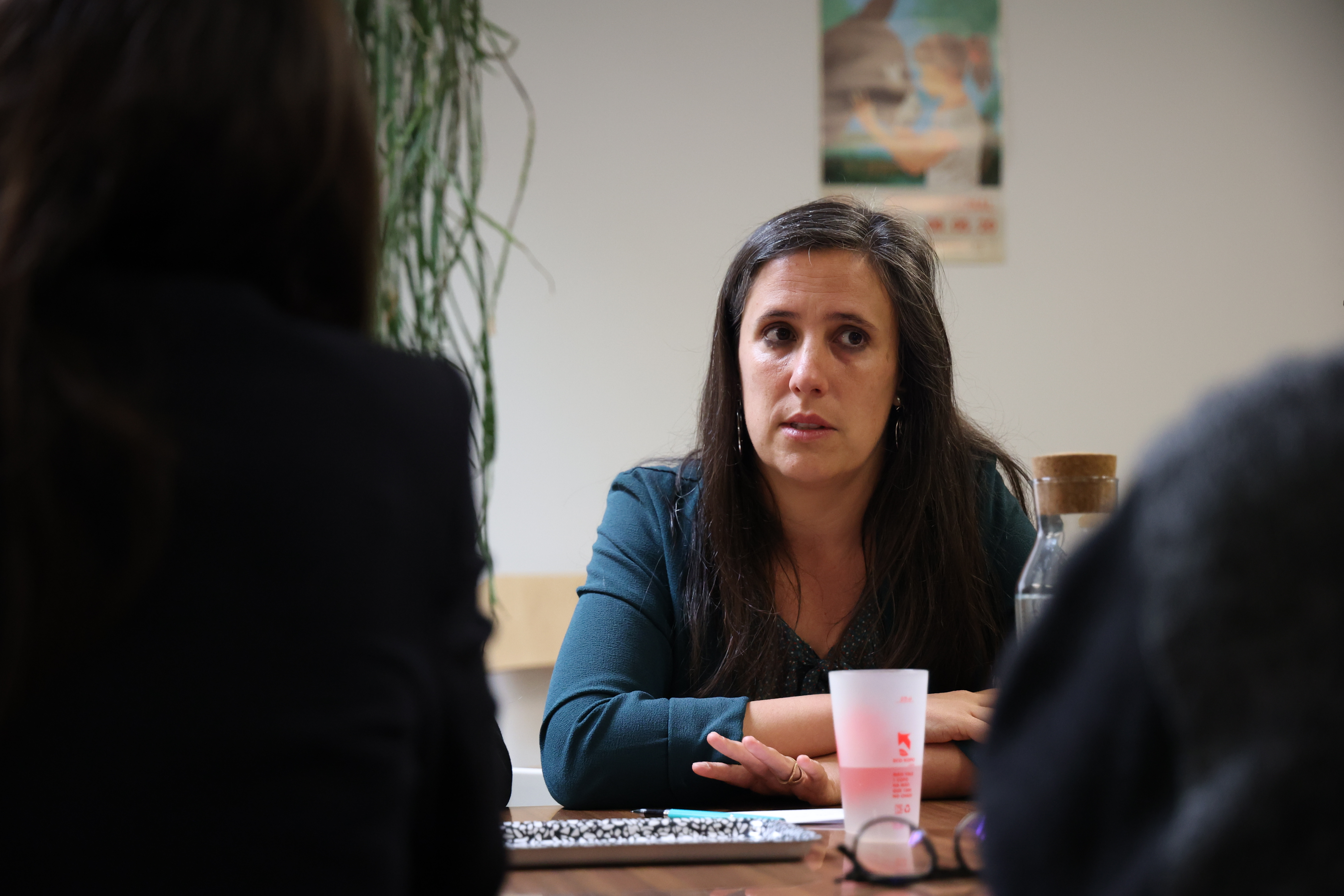

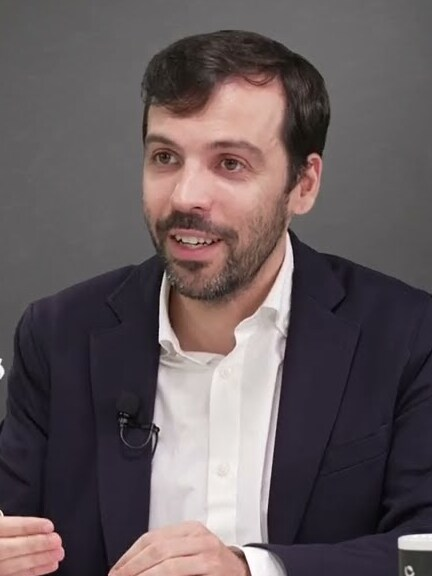

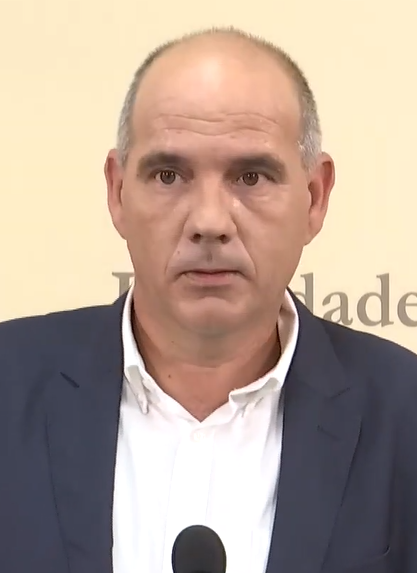

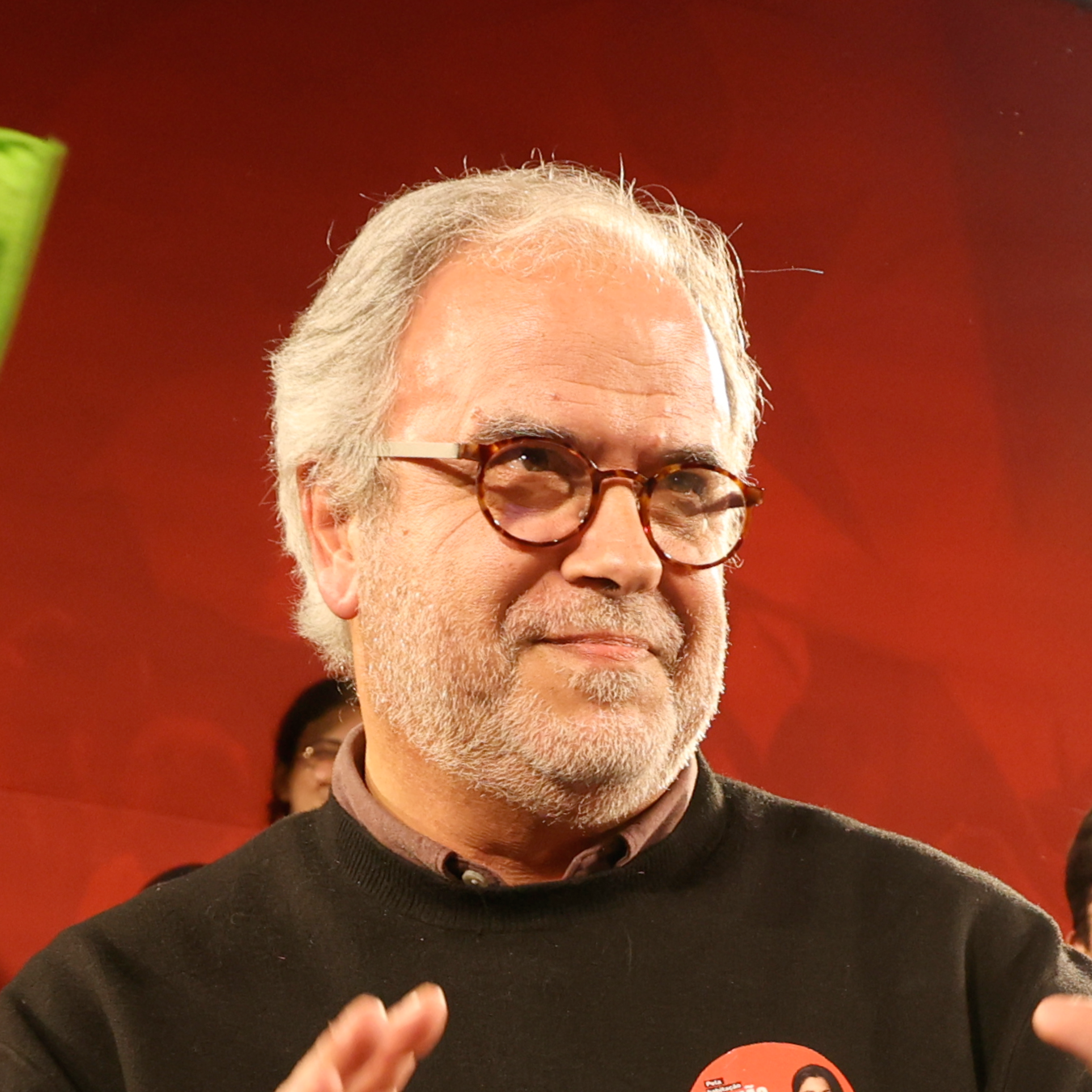

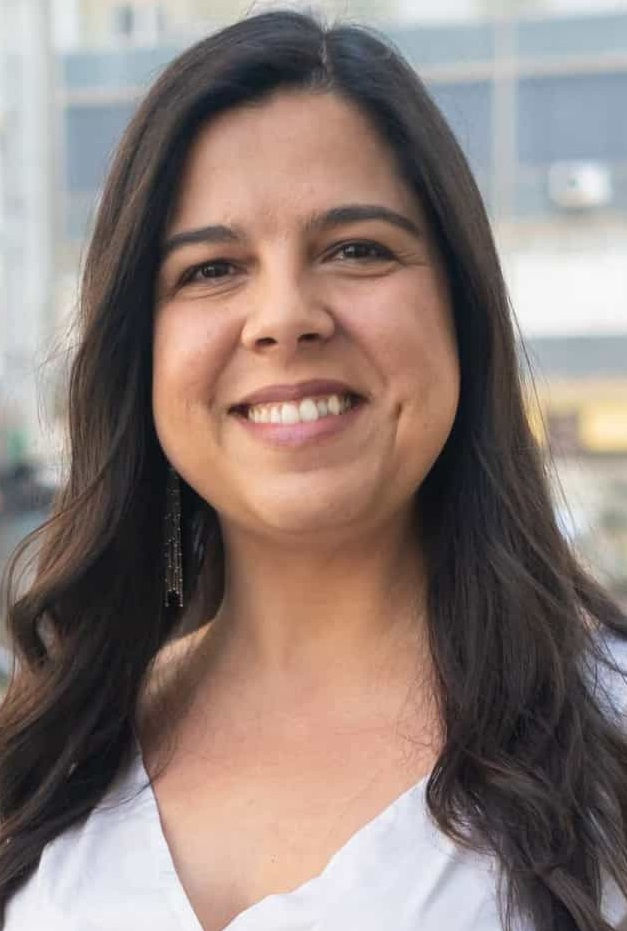

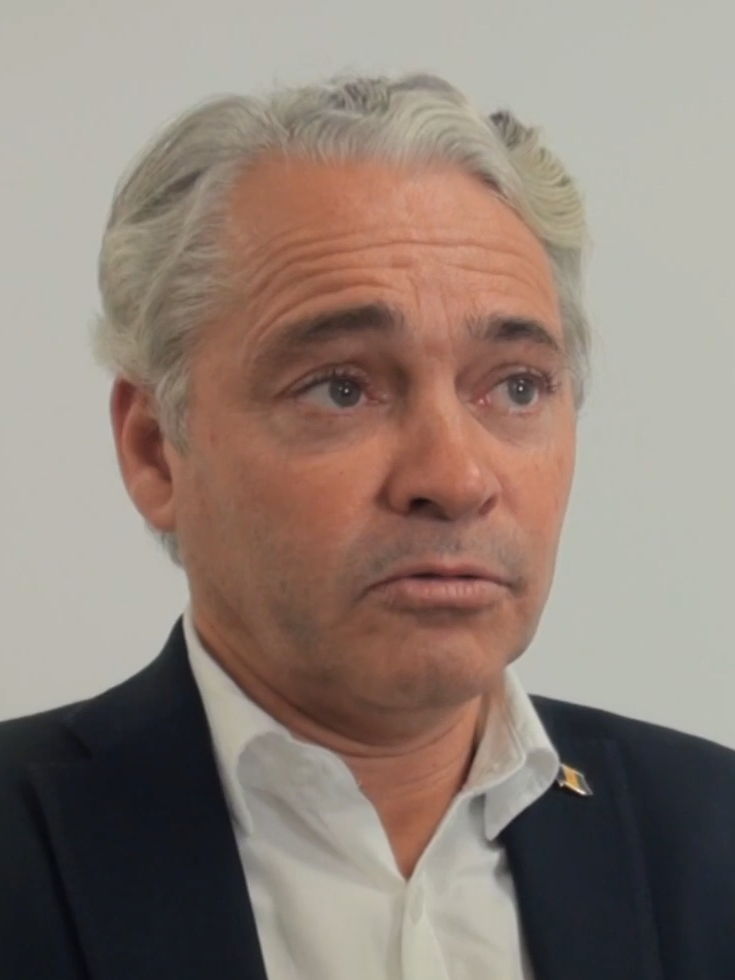
Leader	Luís Montenegro	André Ventura	José Luís Carneiro
Party	PSD	CH	PS
Alliance	AD
Leader since	28 May 2022 (Note: As leader of the Social Democratic Party (PSD).)	9 April 2019	28 June 2025
Leader's seat	Aveiro	Lisbon	Braga
Last election	91 seats, 31.8% (Note: The Social Democratic Party (PPD/PSD) and the CDS - People's Party (CDS-PP) contested the 2024 election in a coalition called Democratic Alliance (AD) and won a combined 31.8% of the vote and elected 91 MPs to parliament. 89 of the MPs elected in 2025 are from PPD/PSD, while CDS-PP elected 2.)	60 seats, 22.8%	58 seats, 22.8%
Seats needed	▲25	▲56	▲58
Leader	Mariana Leitão	Isabel Mendes Lopes; Jorge Pinto	Paulo Raimundo
Party	IL	LIVRE	PCP
Alliance			CDU
Leader since	19 July 2025	12 July 2026	12 November 2022
Leader's seat	Lisbon	Lisbon; Porto	Lisbon
Last election	9 seats, 5.4%	6 seats, 4.1%	3 seats, 2.9% (Note: The Portuguese Communist Party (PCP) and the Ecologist Party "The Greens" (PEV) contested the 2025 election in a coalition called Unitary Democratic Coalition (CDU) and won a combined 2.9% of the vote and elected 3 MPs to parliament. The 3 MPs elected in 2025 are all from PCP. PEV elected zero.)
Seats needed	▲107	▲110	▲113
Leader	José Manuel Pureza	Inês Sousa Real	Élvio Sousa
Party	BE	PAN	JPP
Leader since	30 November 2025	6 June 2021	27 January 2015
Leader's seat	– (Note: José Manuel Pureza formerly served as an MP from Coimbra District between 2009 and 2011 and from 2015 until 2022. In the present Parliament, he hasn't got a seat.)	Lisbon	Europe (not elected)
Last election	1 seat, 2.0%	1 seat, 1.4%	1 seat, 0.3%
Seats needed	▲115	▲115	▲115
Incumbent Prime Minister
Luís Montenegro
PSD

The next Portuguese legislative election will take place on or before 14 October 2029 to elect members of the Assembly of the Republic to the 18th Legislature of Portugal. All 230 seats to the Assembly of the Republic will be at stake.

The 2025 election resulted in a hung parliament and the formation of a minority government led by Luís Montenegro. An election may occur before the scheduled date if the President of Portugal dissolves Parliament for a snap election or if the Assembly of the Republic passes a motion of no confidence in the government. Early elections are more likely during minority governments, as the Prime Minister does not command a majority in the Assembly.

== Background ==
In the 2025 election, called after alleged conflicts of interests into the prime minister's family business, (Note: Following an investigation into these allegations, the Public Prosecution Service closed the case in December 2025, without charges being filed.) the centre-right to right-wing Democratic Alliance (AD) was re-elected with 32% of the votes and 91 seats, with the far-right populist party Chega (CH) becoming the second largest party in Parliament, by gathering 60 seats and 23% of the votes. The Socialist Party (PS) fell to third place for the first time in democracy, with also 23% of the votes and just 58 seats. The Liberal Initiative (IL) remained stable, at 5% and 9 seats, while LIVRE surpassed BE and PCP by gathering 4% of the votes and six seats. The other left-wing parties, the Portuguese Communist Party (PCP) and the Left Bloc (BE), achieved their worst results ever, with only 3 and 1 seats, respectively. The People Animals Nature (PAN) maintained their sole seat, whereas the Madeiran-based Together for the People (JPP) entered Parliament for the first time.

Eleven days after election day, on 29 May 2025, Luis Montenegro was asked by President of the Republic Marcelo Rebelo de Sousa to form a government, once again a minority one. The new government was sworn into office on 5 June 2025. On the October 2025 local elections, the PSD gained the most councils across the country, mainly the five most populated municipalities, surpassing the PS and becoming the largest party in local government. In the first round of the 2026 presidential election, the AD supported candidate, Luís Marques Mendes, polled just 11% of the votes and failed to reach the second round. António José Seguro (PS) and André Ventura (CH) were the candidates who advanced to the second round, with Seguro being elected President, easily defeating Ventura by a 67% to 33% margin, and opening a new period of cohabitation.

With the economy performing well and unemployment at very low levels, Montenegro's second government has been dominated by issues like immigration, with the approval of new legislation, supported by Chega, which restricted migration policy in Portugal, (the original proposal was initially sent to the Constitutional Court by President Marcelo Rebelo de Sousa, with the Court blocking the government's legislation), labour reforms that have received backlash from trade unions with general strikes in 2025 and 2026, the problematic state of the National Health Service, and the constant failures from the welfare state, in addition to the persistent housing crisis, leading to protests demanding affordable housing, along with complaints about the police and government's response to the protests. Environmental disasters, such as the August 2025 Portuguese wildfires and the January 2026 Storm Kristin, have also increased pressure on the government, with criticisms directed at the alleged slow response and lack of coordination, adding to this the international front with the impacts of the 2026 Iran war on energy prices and the cost of living. Contentions surrounding several government ministers (Note: Chiefly the education (Fernando Alexandre) and home affairs (Luís Neves) ministers.) have likewise generated further criticisms towards the government, while internal divisions within the PSD have an impact as well, with former prime minister Pedro Passos Coelho constantly criticizing the government and considering a possible return. Accusations of parliamentary gridlock have also been recurring, with the opposition blocking several of the government's policies and proposals.

=== Leadership changes and challenges ===
==== Socialist Party ====
After achieving a disappointing result and finishing in third place, then secretary-general Pedro Nuno Santos resigned on election night, 18 May 2025, leaving the party's president Carlos César as interim leader. A leadership election was ultimately called for 27 and 28 June 2025.

José Luís Carneiro announced his intention to run for the party's leadership on the day after the May 2025 election, while other figures like Mariana Vieira da Silva, Fernando Medina and Alexandra Leitão declined to run. After the deadline for submitting candidacies passed on 12 June 2025, Carneiro was the only candidate to submit one, making him the de facto winner of the ballot and the newly elected leader of the party. This was confirmed by the ballot results, with Carneiro garnering more than 95% of the votes, albeit a turnout rate below 50%.

Ballot: 27 and 28 June 2025
Candidate	Votes	%
José Luís Carneiro	17,434	95.5
Blank/Invalid ballots	829	4.5
Turnout	18,263	48.9
Source: Results

After the ballot, questions arose about the validity of this vote: According to the party's statutes, holding a party congress following a leadership vote is mandatory, but because there was no date for a congress, Carneiro's leadership would be labeled as interim, thus forcing a new leadership ballot at short notice. The party's parliamentary leader, Eurico Brilhante Dias, confirmed that the election of Carneiro was to complete the term left vacant by Pedro Nuno Santos, which would expire in early 2026. After the first round of the 2026 Presidential election was held, it was announced that the party would hold a new leadership ballot on 13 and 14 March 2026, with Carneiro running for a full term. Other potential candidates like Alexandra Leitão, Ana Mendes Godinho, Duarte Cordeiro and Miguel Prata Roque refused to run and endorsed Carneiro's reelection, with the incumbent PS leader being once again the only candidate on the ballot. Carneiro was elected for a full term as leader with 97.1% of the votes, under a 55% turnout rate.

==== Liberal Initiative ====
On 31 May 2025, Liberal Initiative President Rui Rocha announced his resignation as leader, citing the new political scenario and the poor increase of the Liberal Initiative in the previous election as reasons for his resignation. The party's secretary-general, Miguel Rangel, assumed the interim leadership until the next convention, after all the vice presidents refused to do so. The leadership convention ended up being scheduled for 19 July 2025.

On 4 June, Mariana Leitão, parliamentary leader and the party's former 2026 presidential candidate, announced her candidacy for the party's leadership, withrawing from the presidential race the following day, while other speculated names like Bernardo Blanco, former MP from Lisbon, Mário Amorim Lopes, MP from Aveiro, and Rui Malheiro, candidate for the February 2025 leadership election, declined to run. After the deadline for submitting candidacies passed on 4 July 2025, Leitão was the only candidate to submit one, making her the winner of the ballot and the newly elected leader of the party, although this would only be official after the leadership convention vote. On 19 July 2025, during the party's convention held in Alcobaça with 985 members registered to vote, Leitão was elected with 73% of the votes:

Ballot: 19 July 2025
Candidate	Votes	%
Mariana Leitão	493	73.4
Blank/Invalid ballots	179	26.6
Turnout	672	68.22
Source: RTP

A leadership convention is schedule to be held on 30 and 31 January 2027, in the Lisbon metro area, with party leader Mariana Leitão running for a second term. Unlike in the July 2025 ballot, she's expected to face challenges in her reelection bid, with party members Tiago Romão and Margarida Pouseiro announcing their own candidacies for the leadership.

==== Left Bloc ====
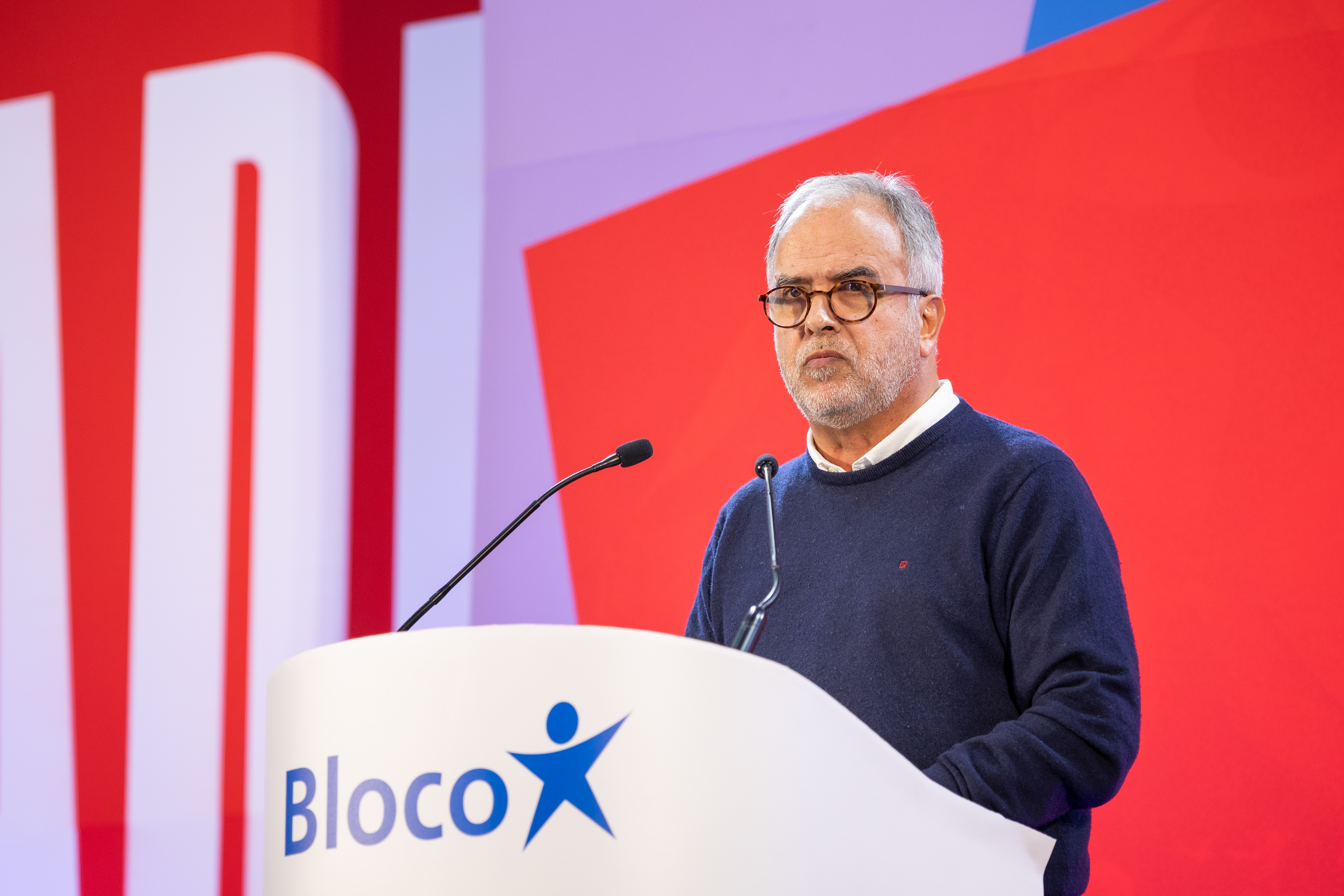
José Manuel Pureza delivering his victory speech at the 14th BE Convention on 30 November 2025 in Lisbon

The Left Bloc held a leadership convention on 29 and 30 November 2025. At first, party leader Mariana Mortágua was expected to run for re-election, however, after the party's poor showings in both the October local elections and in the May 2025 snap legislative election, Mortágua announced, on 25 October 2025, that she would not run for another term after all and would resign from her seat in Parliament also. Former vice president of parliament, José Manuel Pureza, announced a bid for the leadership, while a group of critics of Mortágua's leadership, led by Adelino Fortunato, also announced their intention to run for the party's leadership in the convention. Three other motions from opposition groups were also tabled, although one of them was not for the leadership itself. There were 598 delegates eligible to vote at the party convention. On 30 November 2025, José Manuel Pureza was easily elected as new leader with more than 81% of the delegates votes.

Ballot: 30 November 2025
Candidate	Votes	%
José Manuel Pureza	384	81.4
Adelino Fortunato	47	10.0
Samuel Cardoso	26	5.5
Ana Sofia Ligeiro	15	3.2
Blank/Invalid ballots	7	–
Turnout	479	80.10
Source: Público

==== People Animals Nature ====
The People Animals Nature (PAN) held a leadership congress on 20 December 2025. Party leader Inês Sousa Real ran for another term, but she faced a lot of criticism regarding her leadership, with some party members questioning the validity of and opposing the leadership ballot, while dozens of party members announced their departure from the party. Sousa Real was challenged by Carolina Pia, a former party district leader and 2024 candidate for Viseu district. However, Carolina Pia refused to be present on the congress, protesting against the lack of "democratic guarantees", despite her name remaining on the ballot. There were 114 delegates eligible to vote, but just 72 cast a ballot, with Sousa Real being re-elected with 96% of the delegates votes, while Carolina Pia, absent from the congress, got just one vote:

Ballot: 20 December 2025
Candidate	Votes	%
Inês Sousa Real	69	95.8
Carolina Pia	1	1.4
Blank/Invalid ballots	2	2.8
Turnout	72	63.16
Source: Diário de Notícias

In July 2026, the Constitutional Court ruled as invalid the December 2025 ballot that re-elected Sousa Real as party leader. A subsequent appeal by the party was rejected by the Court, and a new leadership congress is expected to be called, although the opposition to Sousa Real considers it unlawful for the current leadership, elected in the December congress, to call any ballot.

==== CDS – People's Party ====
The CDS – People's Party (CDS–PP), currently in coalition with the PSD, held a leadership congress on 16 and 17 May 2026, in Alcobaça. Party leader, and incumbent Defense minister, Nuno Melo ran for another term, and faced a challenge from former party MP Nuno Correia da Silva. On the first day of the congress, Nuno Melo's policy motion was approved with 97.5% votes in favour, while Nuno Correia da Silva's motion, which warned of the risks of the CDS "diluting" into the PSD and proposed that the party run alone in the next elections, received only 8 votes in favor, out of a total of 800 delegates present. On 17 May, with Correia da Silva absent, Melo was reelected to the leadership with 89.7% of the delegates votes.

Ballot: 17 May 2026
Candidate	Votes	%
Nuno Melo	525	89.7
Nuno Correia da Silva	0	0.0
Blank/Invalid ballots	60	10.3
Turnout	585	

==== LIVRE ====
LIVRE (L) party held a leadership congress between 10 and 12 July 2026. On 26 June, the party's founder, co-spokesperson and de facto leader Rui Tavares announced he was leaving the top spot of the list for the contact group (the party's leading organism), opting for the third place on the list. MPs Isabel Mendes Lopes, the other co-spokesperson alongside Tavares, and Jorge Pinto, who finished third to last with 0.7% of the votes in the 2026 presidential election, would lead the leadership-aligned list. The ballot was also contested by two candidates opposed to Tavares' leadership, sociologist and contact group member Rodrigo Brito and Tiago Mota, who accused the party's leadership of "concentration of power, lack of internal cohesion and transparency". The Tavares-aligned list was elected with nearly 68% of the votes, while the opposition lists gathered just 30%.

Ballot: 12 July 2026
Candidate	Votes	%
Isabel Mendes Lopes; Jorge Pinto	432	67.9
Rodrigo Brito	132	20.8
Tiago Mota	60	9.4
Abstention	12	1.9
Turnout	636	
Source: Público

Despite having stepped down as spokesperson, the party acknowledged that Rui Tavares may still be the party's leading candidate in the legislative election campaign, with Tavares remaining an active figure in the party, setting himself to lead the party's strategy department. Tavares also stated that it was time to "rotate the spearheads".

=== Date ===
According to the Portuguese Constitution, an election must be called between 14 September and 14 October of the year that the legislature ends. The election is called by the President of Portugal but is not called at the request of the Prime Minister; however, the President must listen to all of the parties represented in Parliament and the election day must be announced at least 60 days before the election. If an election is called during an ongoing legislature (dissolution of parliament) it must be held at least after 55 days. Election day is the same in all multi-seats constituencies, and should fall on a Sunday or national holiday. The next legislative election must, therefore, take place no later than 14 October 2029.

The President of Portugal has the power to dissolve the Assembly of the Republic by his/her own will. Unlike in other countries, the President can refuse to dissolve the parliament at the request of the Prime Minister or the Assembly of the Republic and all the parties represented in Parliament. If the Prime Minister resigns, the President can appoint a new Prime Minister after listening to all the parties represented in Parliament and then the government programme must be subject to discussion by the Assembly of the Republic, whose members of parliament may present a motion to reject the upcoming government, or dissolve Parliament and call new elections.

=== Electoral system ===
The Assembly of the Republic has 230 members elected to four-year terms. Governments do not require absolute majority support of the Assembly to hold office, as even if the number of opposers of government is larger than that of the supporters, the number of opposers still needs to be equal or greater than 116 (absolute majority) for both the Government's Programme to be rejected or for a motion of no confidence to be approved.

The number of seats assigned to each district depends on the district magnitude. The use of the d'Hondt method makes for a higher effective threshold than certain other allocation methods such as the Hare quota or Sainte-Laguë method, which are more generous to small parties.

The distribution of MPs by electoral district for the 2025 legislative election was the following:

Constituency	Number of MPs	Map
Lisbon	48	
Porto	40	
Braga and Setúbal	19 each	
Aveiro	16	
Leiria	10	
Coimbra, Faro and Santarém	9 each	
Viseu	8	
Madeira	6	
Azores, Viana do Castelo and Vila Real	5 each	
Castelo Branco	4	
Beja, Bragança, Évora and Guarda	3 each	
Portalegre, Europe and Outside Europe	2 each	

== Parties ==
The table below lists parties currently represented in the Assembly of the Republic.

Name			Ideology	Political position	Leader	2025 result		Status
Name			Ideology	Political position	Leader	%	Seats	Status
AD	PPD/PSD	Social Democratic Party; Partido Social Democrata (Note: One of the PPD/PSD MPs is Pedro Soares Pimenta, Earth Party leader, who ran in the AD list for the Lisbon constituency and holds a seat as an independent in the Social Democratic Party's parliamentary group.)	Liberal conservatism	Centre-right	Luís Montenegro	31.8%	89 / 230	Governing coalition
AD	CDS–PP	CDS – People's Party; CDS – Partido Popular	Christian democracy Conservatism	Centre-right to right-wing	Nuno Melo	31.8%	2 / 230	Governing coalition
CH	Enough! Chega!		National conservatism Right-wing populism	Far-right	André Ventura	22.8%	60 / 230	Opposition
PS	Socialist Party; Partido Socialista		Social democracy	Centre-left	José Luís Carneiro	22.8%	58 / 230	Opposition
IL	Liberal Initiative; Iniciativa Liberal		Classical liberalism Libertarianism	Centre-right to right-wing	Mariana Leitão	5.4%	9 / 230	Opposition
L	FREE; LIVRE		Green politics Pro-Europeanism	Centre-left to left-wing	Isabel Mendes Lopes; Jorge Pinto	4.1%	6 / 230	Opposition
CDU	PCP	Portuguese Communist Party; Partido Comunista Português	Communism; Marxism–Leninism	Far-left	Paulo Raimundo	2.9%	3 / 230	Opposition
BE	Left Bloc; Bloco de Esquerda		Democratic socialism Left-wing populism	Left-wing to far-left	José Manuel; Pureza	2.0%	1 / 230	Opposition
PAN	People Animals Nature; Pessoas-Animais-Natureza		Animal welfare Environmentalism	Centre to centre-left (Note: Some sources state that People Animals Nature (PAN) is neither on the left nor the right.)	Inês Sousa Real	1.4%	1 / 230	Opposition
JPP	Together for the People; Juntos pelo Povo		Regionalism; Social liberalism	Centre to centre-left	Élvio Sousa	0.3%	1 / 230	Opposition

== Opinion polling ==

=== Polling aggregations ===
Polling aggregator	Last update	AD	PS	CH	IL	L	CDU	BE	PAN	Lead
PolitPro	21 Nov 2026	22.7	29.1	26.0	6.5	4.0	2.7	2.1	1.7	3.1
Politico	18 Nov 2026	22	28	25	6	4	3	2	2	3
Marktest	15 Nov 2026	22.0	29.7	27.4	5.6	3.8	2.1	2.1	1.3	2.3
Europe Elects	14 Nov 2026	21.7	29.4	26.2	6.3	4.1	2.8	2.2	1.8	3.2
2025 legislative election	18 May 2025	31.8; 91	22.8; 58	22.8; 60	5.4; 9	4.1; 6	2.9; 3	2.0; 1	1.4; 1	9.0

== See also ==
- Elections in Portugal
- List of political parties in Portugal
- Politics of Portugal
