= Carla Castro =

Portuguese politician (born 1978)

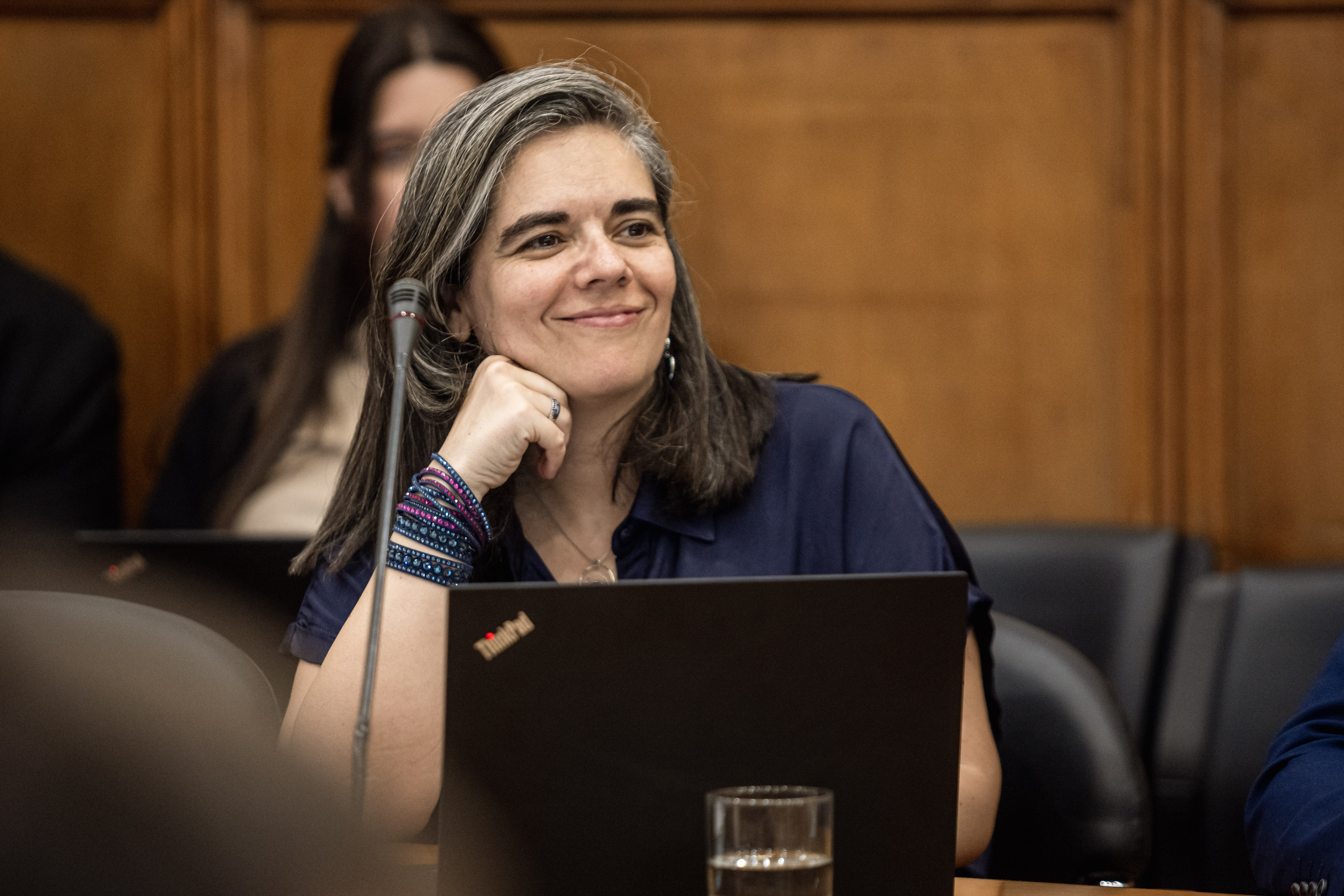
- Castro in 2023

Member of the Assembly of the Republic
- In office 29 March 2022 – 10 March 2024
- Constituency: Lisbon

Personal details
- Born: 6 April 1978 (age 48) Lisbon, Portugal
- Party: Independent (since 2024)
- Other political affiliations: Liberal Initiative (2018–2024)
- Education: Lisbon School of Economics (BEc and MBA); University Institute of Lisbon (PhD)

Carla Maria Proença de Castro Charters de Azevedo, better known as Carla Castro (born 6 April 1978 in Lisbon), is a manager, professor, and Portuguese politician. She currently serves as a Member of Parliament in the Assembly of the Republic for the Iniciativa Liberal (IL).

She is a professional manager with a career in strategy and marketing in the insurance sector. For 13 years, she taught strategy and consumer behavior and control management associated with strategic implementation as an Assistant and Guest Professor at the Lusófona University in Lisbon. She was also an invited lecturer at the Portuguese Academy of Insurance for over 12 years. She suspended all professional activities in 2019, to respond to the challenge launched by then IL president, Carlos Guimarães Pinto, to advise the party's then only deputy, João Cotrim de Figueiredo, and build the Knowledge Center. She was vice-president of the IL parliamentary group from March 2022 until May 2023. She is also a member of Portuguese Parliament Board.

== Politics ==
She was a member of the Executive Committee of Iniciativa Liberal from 2019 to 2023.

In the 2022 legislative elections, she was elected as a Member of Parliament for the electoral district of Lisbon, having previously served as an advisor to the party's only deputy, João Cotrim de Figueiredo, since October 2019, and as coordinator of the IL's knowledge center.

After the premature announcement of João Cotrim Figueiredo's departure from the party leadership in October 2022, Carla Castro declared her candidacy for the leadership of the liberals.

Her list obtained 757 votes (44.0%) against List L, which received 888 votes (51.7%) for Rui Rocha, supported by João Cotrim Figueiredo and a significant part of the party structure. The list of counselor José Cardoso (List A) received 74 votes (4.3%).

After the January 2023 convention, Carla Castro offered her position as Vice President of the Parliamentary Group, but there was a consensus for the leadership of the group to remain in office. The vice-president of Carla Castro's list, Paulo Carmona, had proposed that Rui Rocha be the next parliamentary leader if Carla Castro were elected president of the liberals.

Also, after the convention, still in January 2023, Carla left the Budget and Finance Committee, however, she remained in the Education and Science Committee as the coordinator of the parliamentary group. At the same time, she took a position in the Labor, Social Security, and Inclusion Committee.

On 5 May 2023, she resigned as vice-president of the parliamentary group, stating that the position did not align with practice, expressing dissatisfaction with the management of the parliamentary group's activities.

Castro announced in January 2024 that she would be leaving IL at the end of her term, after being despromoted in the party lists for the 2024 legislative elections. There was speculation that she could have joined the Social Democratic Party's lists, but she instead chose to retire from politics. She later supported PSD candidate Luís Marques Mendes in the 2026 presidential election.

== See also ==
- Liberalism in Portugal
