= Miguel Rangel (politician) =

Portuguese politician

President of the Liberal Initiative
- Acting
- In office 31 May 2025 – 19 July 2025
- Preceded by: Rui Rocha
- Succeeded by: Mariana Leitão

Secretary-General of the Liberal Initiative
- In office 13 October 2018 – 19 July 2025
- President: Carlos Guimarães Pinto; João Cotrim de Figueiredo; Rui Rocha
- Preceded by: Rodrigo Saraiva
- Succeeded by: Rui Ribeiro

Member of the Assembly of the Republic
- Incumbent
- Assumed office 3 June 2025
- Constituency: Porto

Personal details
- Born: Miguel Machado da Silva Rangel da Fonseca; 24 November 1975 (age 50) Porto, Portugal
- Party: Liberal Initiative (since 2017)
- Occupation: Food engineer • Politician

Miguel Machado da Silva Rangel da Fonseca (born 24 November 1975) is a Portuguese politician who currently serves as a Member of the Assembly of the Republic from Porto, having been elected in the 2025 legislative election.

Rangel also served as Secretary-General of the Liberal Initiative from 2018 until 2025, being the interim party leader after the resignation of Rui Rocha, in May 2025.
