= Angélique da Teresa =

Portuguese politician (born 1977)

Vice President of the Liberal Initiative
- In office 2 February 2025 – 19 July 2025
- President: Rui Rocha; Miguel Rangel (acting)

Member of the Assembly of the Republic
- Incumbent
- Assumed office 3 June 2025
- Constituency: Lisbon

Member of the Lisbon Municipal Assembly
- Incumbent
- Assumed office 26 September 2021

Personal details
- Born: Angélique Inês da Teresa; 30 October 1977 (age 48) Saint-Denis, Seine-Saint-Denis, France
- Citizenship: Portugal; France
- Party: Liberal Initiative (since 2017)
- Children: 2
- Education: Moderna University; Catholic University of Portugal

Angélique Inês da Teresa (born 30 October 1977) is a Portuguese-French politician, who is, since 2025, a member of the Assembly of the Republic from the Liberal Initiative.

Angélique has a degree in Development and Cooperation Sciences, a postgraduate degree in Political Sciences and a master's degree in Communication Sciences, specializing in Media and Journalism. With around 20 years of experience in communication and marketing in the private sector, she is currently responsible for communications at a real estate company.

She was one of the founders of Liberal Initiative (IL), having been a member of the National Council and a collaborator of ILab in the housing area, contributing to the party's legislative and municipal programs. She is a member of the Lisbon Municipal Assembly since 2021.
