= List of universities and colleges in Portugal =

This list of universities and colleges in Portugal gives the Portuguese institutions providing higher education. Higher education in Portugal is organized into two systems: university and polytechnic. There are public and private higher education institutions.

== Universities ==
=== Public universities ===
- ISCTE - University Institute of Lisbon
- Technical University of Porto
- University of the Azores
- University of Algarve (includes polytechnic schools)
- University of Aveiro (includes polytechnic schools)
- University of Beira Interior
- University of Coimbra (includes polytechnic schools)
- University of Évora (includes polytechnic schools)
- University of Leiria and Oeste
- University of Lisbon (includes polytechnic schools)
- University of Madeira (includes polytechnic schools)
- University of Minho (includes polytechnic schools)
- NOVA University of Lisbon
- University of Porto (includes polytechnic schools)
- University of Trás-os-Montes and Alto Douro (includes polytechnic schools)

=== Public distance learning universities ===
- Universidade Aberta

=== Former public learning universities ===
- University of Lisbon (1911-2013)
- Technical University of Lisbon (1930-2013)

=== Private ===
==== Private universities ====
- Autonomous University of Lisbon
- Catholic University of Portugal (includes polytechnic schools)
- European University of Lisbon
- Fernando Pessoa University (Porto and Ponte de Lima) (includes polytechnic schools)
- Lusíada University (Lisbon, Porto and Vila Nova de Famalicão)
- Universidade Lusófona (Lisbon and Porto) (includes polytechnic schools)
- Portucalense Infante D. Henrique University (Porto)

==== Private institutes and schools ====
- CESPU - Cooperativa de Ensino Superior Politécnico e Universitário (Gandra, Penafiel and Vila Nova de Famalicão) (includes polytechnic schools)
- Escola Superior Artística do Porto
- Escola Superior de Actividades Imobiliárias (Lisbon)
- Escola Superior Gallaecia (Vila Nova de Cerveira)
- Escola Universitária Vasco da Gama (Coimbra)
- Instituto Superior de Ciências da Saúde Egas Moniz (Almada) (includes polytechnic schools)
- Instituto Piaget (Almada, Silves, Vila Nova de Gaia and Viseu) (includes polytechnic schools)
- Instituto Superior de Gestão
- Instituto Superior Manuel Teixeira Gomes (Portimão)
- Instituto Superior Miguel Torga (Coimbra)
- Instituto Superior de Serviço Social do Porto
- Instituto Superior da Maia
- Instituto Superior de Gestão e Administração de Leiria
- Instituto Universitário de Ciências Psicológicas, Sociais e da Vida (Lisbon)

== Polytechnic institutes ==
=== Public polytechnic universities and schools ===
- Polytechnic University of Beja
- Polytechnic University of Bragança
- Polytechnic University of Castelo Branco
- Polytechnic University of Cávado and Ave
- Polytechnic University of Coimbra
- Polytechnic University of Guarda
- Polytechnic University of Lisbon
- Polytechnic University of Portalegre
- Polytechnic University of Santarém
- Polytechnic University of Setúbal
- Polytechnic University of Tomar
- Polytechnic University of Viana do Castelo
- Polytechnic University of Viseu
- Escola Superior de Hotelaria e Turismo do Estoril
- Escola Náutica Infante D. Henrique
- Escola Superior de Enfermagem de Coimbra
- Escola Superior de Enfermagem de Lisboa
- Escola Superior de Enfermagem do Porto

=== Private polytechnic institutes and schools ===
- Academia Nacional Superior de Orquestra (Lisbon)
- Atlântica - Escola Universitária de Ciências Empresariais (School of Management Sciences, Health, IT & Engineering) (Oeiras)
- Escola Superior de Negócios Atlântico (Atlântico Business School) (Vila Nova de Gaia)
- Conservatório Superior de Música de Gaia
- Escola Superior de Artes e Design (Matosinhos)
- Escola Superior Artística de Guimarães
- Escola Superior de Educação de Almeida Garrett (Lisbon)
- Escola Superior de Educação de João de Deus (Lisbon)
- Escola Superior de Educação de Paula Frassinetti (Porto)
- Escola Superior de Educadores de Infância Maria Ulrich (Lisbon)
- Escola Superior de Saúde do Alcoitão (Alcoitão, Alcabideche)
- Escola Superior de Saúde Atlântica (Oeiras)
- Escola Superior de Saúde da Cruz Vermelha Portuguesa (Lisbon)
- Escola Superior de Saúde de Santa Maria (Porto)
- Escola Superior de Tecnologias e Artes de Lisboa
- Instituto de Estudos Superiores de Fafe
- Polytechnic Institute of Maia
- Instituto Português de Administração de Marketing (Lisbon and Porto)
- Instituto Superior de Administração e Gestão (Porto)
- Instituto Superior de Administração e Línguas (Funchal)
- Instituto Superior de Ciências da Administração (Lisbon)
- Instituto Superior de Ciências Educativas (Lisbon and Penafiel)
- Instituto Superior de Ciências Empresariais e do Turismo (Porto)
- Instituto Superior de Ciências da Informação e da Administração (Aveiro)
- Instituto Superior de Comunicação Empresarial (Lisbon School of Business Communication)
- Instituto Superior D. Dinis (Marinha Grande)
- Instituto Superior de Educação e Ciências (Lisbon)
- Instituto Superior de Entre Douro e Vouga (Santa Maria da Feira)
- Instituto Superior de Novas Profissões (Lisbon)
- Instituto Superior de Paços de Brandão
- Instituto Superior Politécnico Gaya (Vila Nova de Gaia)
- Instituto Superior Politécnico do Oeste (Torres Vedras)
- Instituto Superior de Tecnologias Avançadas de Lisboa (Lisbon and Porto)
- ISAVE - Instituto Superior de Saúde (Amares)
- Instituto Superior de Educação e Ciências (Lisbon)
- ISLA - Instituto Politécnico de Gestão e Tecnologia (Vila Nova de Gaia)
- ISLA - Instituto Superior de Gestão e Administração de Santarém
- Escola Superior de Enfermagem Dr. José Timóteo Montalvão Machado (Chaves)
- Escola Superior de Enfermagem São Francisco das Misericórdias (Lisbon)
- Escola Superior de Enfermagem de São José de Cluny (Funchal)
- Escola Superior de Saúde Norte da Cruz Vermelha Portuguesa (Oliveira de Azeméis)

== Military and police higher education ==
- Air Force Academy
- Military Academy
- Naval School
- Instituto Superior de Ciências Policiais e Segurança Interna

== See also ==
- Higher education in Portugal
- List of colleges and universities
- List of schools in Portugal
