= Polytechnic (Portugal) =

Higher education sub-system in Portugal

Polytechnic education in Portugal (ensino superior politécnico) is one of the two main subsystems of Higher education in Portugal, operating alongside the university subsystem (ensino superior universitário). Designed as a binary higher education system, Portuguese polytechnics focus on profession-oriented training, applied research, technological development, and regional innovation.

Both public and private polytechnic institutions form an integral part of the European Higher Education Area (EHEA) and operate under the National Qualifications Framework (QNQ) aligned with the European Qualifications Framework (EQF). Higher education degrees granted by polytechnics are fully accredited and evaluated by the Agency for Assessment and Accreditation of Higher Education (A3ES).

== History and evolution ==
The origins of technical and vocational higher education in Portugal trace back to the 19th century with the creation of industrial, commercial, and agricultural institutes, such as the Instituto Industrial de Lisboa and the Instituto Industrial do Porto (founded in 1852), as well as nursing and teacher-training schools across the country.

=== The Veiga Simão Reform (1973) and expansion ===
The modern polytechnic subsystem was formally conceptualized during the major educational reform led by Minister Veiga Simão in 1973. Following the Carnation Revolution of 1974, the government established a national network of state-run polytechnic institutes (institutos politécnicos) throughout the late 1970s and 1980s. This network was created to democratize access to higher education, decentralize academic infrastructure away from Lisbon and Coimbra, and foster socio-economic development across diverse geographical regions.

Many long-standing specialized schools—such as 19th-century engineering schools, nursing colleges, business schools, and agricultural academies—were integrated into regional polytechnic federations.

=== Bologna Process and statutory harmonization ===
With the implementation of the Bologna Process in 2006 and the enactment of the Legal Regime of Higher Education Institutions (RJIES) in 2007, the degree structures across Portuguese higher education were standardized. Polytechnics were fully authorized to grant Licentiate (Bachelor's) and Master's degrees, alongside specialized postgraduate diplomas and Higher Professional Technical Courses (CTeSP).

Subsequent legislative developments further expanded the research capacity of polytechnics, allowing them to host accredited Research & Development (R&D) units funded by the Fundação para a Ciência e a Tecnologia (FCT) and to offer professional doctorates and joint Ph.D. programs in partnership with national and international universities.

=== Modern reorganization and university designation ===
In the 2020s, legislative reforms allowed polytechnic institutions meeting specific academic standards, doctoral degree qualifications among faculty, and accredited research infrastructure to adopt international designations such as "Polytechnic University" or undergo restructuring into technological universities. Notable examples include the transition of the Instituto Politécnico do Porto into the Technical University of Porto, as well as regional reorganization such as the University of Leiria and Oeste.

== Institutional structure and academic scope ==
Polytechnic institutions operate as federations of specialized schools (newer and smaller Escolas Superiores or historic and larger Institutos Superiores). Unlike traditional multi-faculty university models, polytechnics structure their units around specific practical domains:

- Engineering and Technology: Including institutions like the Instituto Superior de Engenharia do Porto (ISEP) or Instituto Superior de Engenharia de Lisboa (ISEL), providing practical engineering, computing, and applied technology education.
- Health and Nursing: Polytechnics are major national providers of nursing education, health technology, allied health sciences, and clinical simulation training.
- Business and Management: Specialized schools covering accounting, administration, marketing, and corporate management.
- Applied Arts, Design, and Media: Dedicated facilities for digital media, performing arts, industrial design, and audiovisual production.
- Education and Social Sciences: Teacher training, early childhood education, and social work.
- Agriculture and Environmental Sciences: Agronomy, veterinary technology, forestry, and marine/coastal sciences.

== Research and industry collaboration ==
Polytechnic higher education emphasizes applied research (investigação aplicada), knowledge transfer, and direct collaboration with industry, business incubators, and municipal authorities.

Key features of polytechnic R&D include:

- FCT-Accredited Research Units: Host to specialized research centers in materials science, robotics, marine resources, biotechnology, and educational innovation.
- Living Labs and FabLabs: Advanced digital fabrication, high-performance computing, and clinical simulation hubs integrated into regional industrial clusters.
- Polytechnic Entrepreneurship: Strong focus on regional technology transfer, spin-off generation, and applied patents developed in partnership with local enterprises.

== Public polytechnic institutions ==
Following the legislative reforms under Law n.º 32/2026, public polytechnic institutions that achieved maximum institutional accreditation by A3ES officially transitioned to the designation of 'Polytechnic University(Universidade Politécnica).

The state-run public polytechnic system in Portugal includes:

- Polytechnic University of Lisbon (formerly Instituto Politécnico de Lisboa)
- Polytechnic University of Coimbra (formerly Instituto Politécnico de Coimbra)
- Polytechnic University of Cávado and Ave (formerly Instituto Politécnico do Cávado e do Ave)
- Polytechnic University of Bragança (formerly Instituto Politécnico de Bragança)
- Polytechnic University of Castelo Branco (formerly Instituto Politécnico de Castelo Branco)
- Polytechnic University of Guarda (formerly Instituto Politécnico da Guarda)
- Polytechnic University of Portalegre (formerly Instituto Politécnico de Portalegre)
- Polytechnic University of Santarém (formerly Instituto Politécnico de Santarém)
- Polytechnic University of Setúbal (formerly Instituto Politécnico de Setúbal)
- Polytechnic University of Tomar (formerly Instituto Politécnico de Tomar)
- Polytechnic University of Viana do Castelo (formerly Instituto Politécnico de Viana do Castelo)
- Polytechnic University of Viseu (formerly Instituto Politécnico de Viseu)
- Polytechnic University of Beja (formerly Instituto Politécnico de Beja)

=== Institutions reorganized into the university subsystem ===
- Technical University of Porto (formerly Instituto Politécnico do Porto)
- University of Leiria and Oeste (formerly Instituto Politécnico de Leiria)

Additionally, public university institutions such as the University of Aveiro, the University of Algarve, the University of Minho, and the University of Madeira incorporate polytechnic schools within their organizational framework.

== See also ==
- Higher education in Portugal
- List of higher education institutions in Portugal
- Vocational education
- Institute of technology

== See also ==
- Higher Education in Portugal
- List of higher education institutions in Portugal#Polytechnic
- Polytechnic (disambiguation)
