= Mariana Leitão =

Portuguese politician

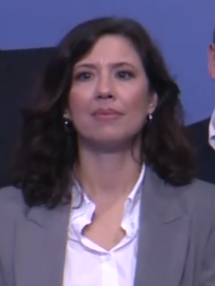
- Leitão in 2025

President of the Liberal Initiative
- Incumbent
- Assumed office 19 July 2025
- Preceded by: Miguel Rangel (acting)

President of the Parliamentary Group of the Liberal Initiative
- In office 26 March 2024 – 21 October 2025
- Preceded by: Rodrigo Saraiva
- Succeeded by: Mário Amorim Lopes

Member of the Assembly of the Republic
- Incumbent
- Assumed office 26 March 2024
- Constituency: Lisbon

Member of the Oeiras Municipal Assembly
- In office 26 September 2021 – 12 October 2025

Personal details
- Born: Mariana de Lemos Barreira Quintão Correia Leitão; 28 September 1982 (age 44) Lisbon, Portugal
- Party: Liberal Initiative (since 2019)
- Children: 2
- Education: Lusíada University of Lisbon

Mariana de Lemos Quintão Correia Leitão (born 28 September 1982) is a Portuguese politician, business administrator and international contract bridge competitor. In the March 2024 national election she was elected to the Assembly of the Republic as one of eight members of the Liberal Initiative (IL) party. She was then elected unanimously by the other seven as the parliamentary leader of the party.

== Early life and education ==
Leitão was born in the Portuguese capital of Lisbon on 28 September 1982. She graduated in 2005 in international relations, from the Lusíada University of Lisbon. Since then, she has taken three post-graduate courses: in business management, from the European University of Lisbon, in international management from ISCTE in Lisbon, and in data science and business analytics from the Instituto Superior de Economia e Gestão (ISEG) in Lisbon. From graduation to 2019 she worked in the field of business administration.

== Political career ==
Leitão joined the IL in 2019. Living in Oeiras, she was elected as a member of the municipal assembly of Oeiras in October 2021. She served as president of the party's national council in 2022 and 2023.

From March 2023 she worked in the national assembly as the chief of staff of the IL. In the March 2024 national election she was second on the IL list of candidates for the Lisbon constituency and was duly elected when the party won three seats.

On 2 February 2025 she was announced as the party's nominee to the 2026 presidential election. On 5 June she withdrew her candidacy to be able to dedicate herself to running for president of the Liberal Initiative.

== Private life ==
Leitão has two daughters. A bridge player since 2008, she has represented Portugal at the 2018 and 2022 European Bridge Championships and at the 2022 World Bridge Championships. She has been a member of the Portuguese Bridge Federation since 2011 and was president of the Lisbon Regional Bridge Association for the 2021-2024 period.
