= Bernardo Blanco =

Portuguese politician (born 1995)

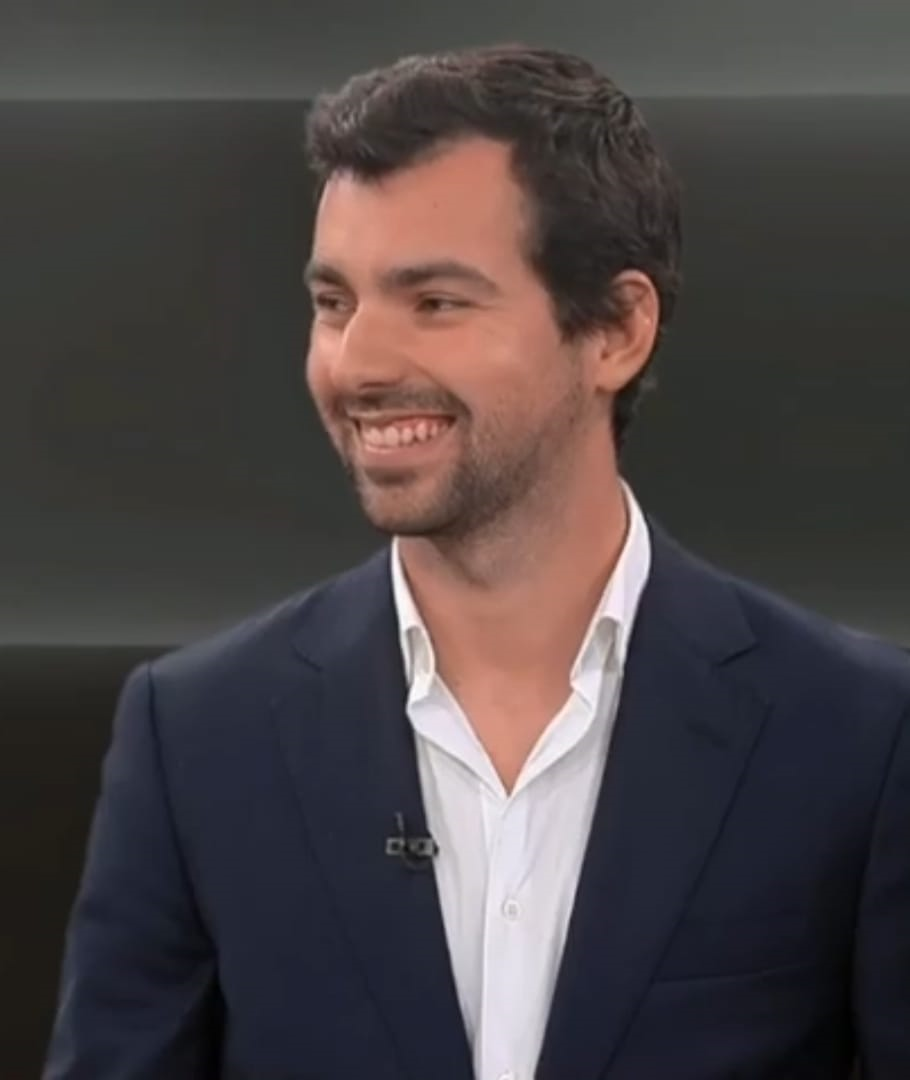
- Blanco in 2022

Member of the Assembly of the Republic
- In office 29 March 2022 – 2 June 2025
- Constituency: Lisbon

Personal details
- Born: Bernardo Alves Martinho Amaral Blanco; 19 November 1995 (age 30) Torres Vedras, Portugal
- Party: Liberal Initiative
- Education: Catholic University of Portugal

Bernardo Alves Martinho Amaral Blanco (born 19 November 1995) is a Portuguese politician. He was a Member of the Portuguese Parliament from 2022 until 2025 and Vice-President of the Liberal Initiative.

== Biography ==
Blanco was born in Torres Vedras in 1995. He holds a degree in management from Catholic University of Portugal, where he also took a Master's in political science. He has worked in the private sector, first at OLX as product manager, then as a member of the strategy team at Liberty Seguros and later at Deloitte.

== Political life ==
He joined the Liberal Initiative (IL) and was head candidate for the District of Leiria in the 2019 legislative election. In the following Portuguese legislative elections of 2022, he rejoined the lists, this time for Lisbon, and was elected MP to the Portuguese Parliament.

Since his election to Parliament in 2022, Bernardo has served as Vice-President of the European Affairs Committee and as coordinator in the Committee of Environment and Energy. He also serves as Vice-President of Liberal Initiative's parliamentary group and as coordinator in the Budget and Finance Committee.

Blanco has garnered particular notoriety through his participation in the parliamentary hearings related to the nationalization process of the country's national airline, TAP Air Portugal, by exposing secret meetings between ruling party members and the company and several other cases of poor management and public expenditure. Some newspapers have used the term "star-MP" to refer to Bernardo for his performance in this role.

In September 2024 he announced his candidacy for the position of Vice-President of ALDE at the upcoming Congress in Estoril, stating his motivation to "reconnect with young people" and "lead them away from extremism towards liberalism".

In his early years, he was vice-president of the Mises Portugal Institute and local coordinator of Students for Liberty. He is also author of the blog "O Insurgente", with his fellow IL MPs Carlos Guimarães Pinto and Rui Rocha.
