= Escola Superior de Enfermagem de Coimbra =

Nursing school in Coimbra, Portugal

Nursing School of Coimbra
- Escola Superior de Enfermagem de Coimbra
- Type: Public Nursing school
- Established: 21 July 2004 (via merger)
- Location: Coimbra, Portugal; 40.2186°N 8.4095°W
- Website: www.esenfc.pt

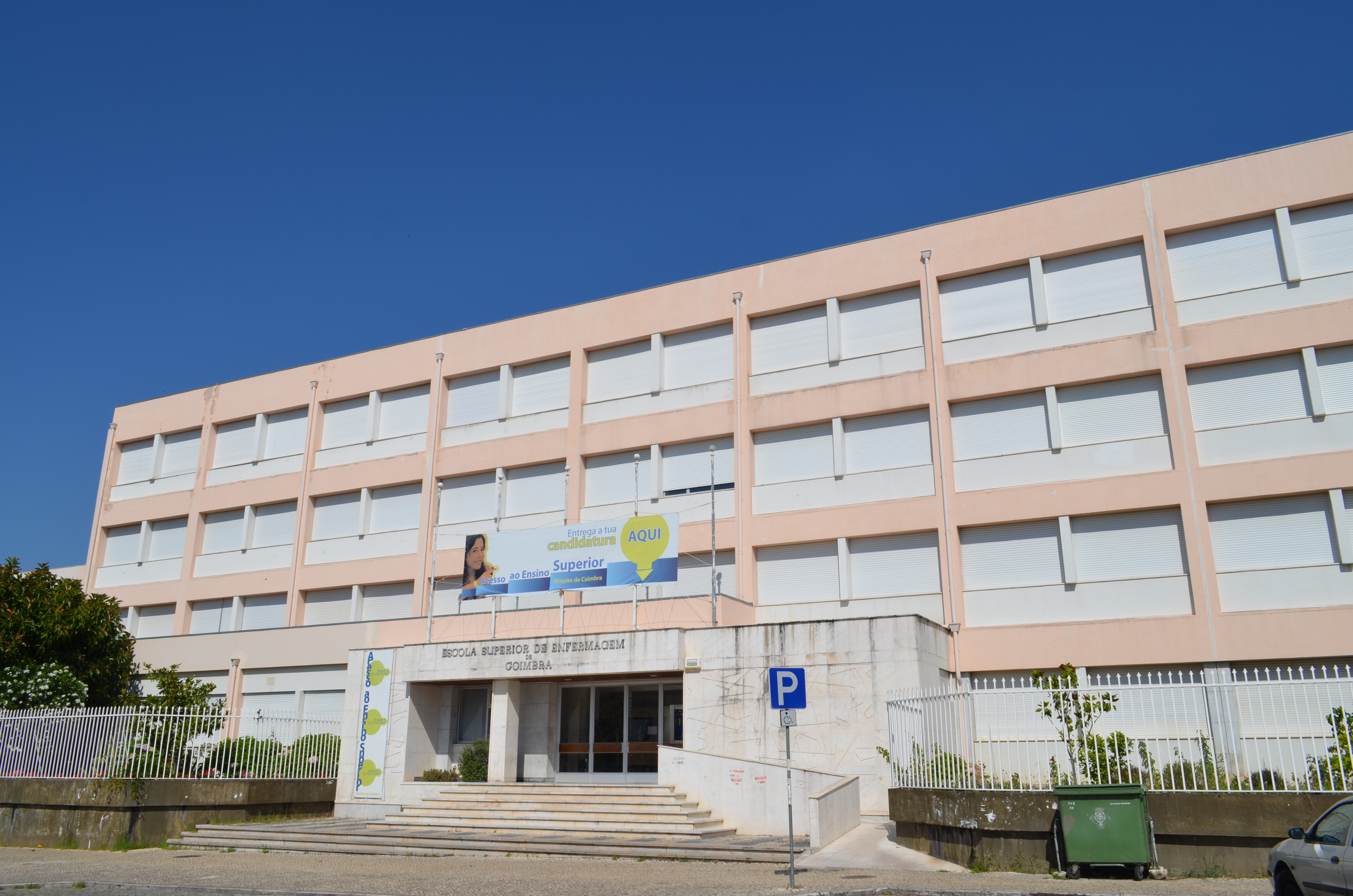
The Escola Superior de Enfermagem de Coimbra (Coimbra Nursing School) in Coimbra, Portugal.

The Escola Superior de Enfermagem de Coimbra (ESEnfC) is a public nursing school in Coimbra, Portugal.

== History ==
It was created after the 2004 decree law Decreto-Lei nº 175/2004 de 21 de Julho through the merging of the two previous nursing schools of Coimbra: the Escola Superior de Enfermagem de Bissaya Barreto and the Escola Superior de Enfermagem Dr. Ângelo da Fonseca which were providing degrees since the 1990s, but whose origins as technical nursing and health training schools can be dated back to the early 20th century.

== See also ==
- List of colleges and universities in Portugal
- Higher education in Portugal
