= Teresa Joaquim =

Social anthropologist (born 1954)

Teresa Joaquim (born 1954) is a social anthropologist who is the coordinator of the first master's program in women's studies in Portugal. Women's Studies – Gender, Citizenship and Development was launched at the Universidade Aberta in 1995 and Joaquim pressed for it to be expanded to include a PhD platform in 2002. She served as a member of the National Ethics Council for Life Sciences between 1996 and 2001 and as part of the Helsinki Group on Women in Science. She has participated in numerous policy development projects evaluating inclusion and equal opportunity for women for the government of Portugal, as well as the European Union.

== Early life and education ==
Teresa Maria da Conceição Joaquim was born in 1954. In 1979, she earned her Licenciatura in Philosophy from the Faculty of Arts of at the University of Lisbon. Joaquim began working as a researcher at the Centro de Estudos das Migrações e das Relações Interculturais (CEMRI, Center for the Study of Migration and Intercultural Relations) as the coordinator of research for the Studies on Women, Gender, Societies and Cultures Group. She completed her PhD in anthropology at the Instituto Superior de Ciências do Trabalho e da Empresa (ISCTE, Higher Institute of Labor and Business Sciences) at the University of Lisbon in 1995.

== Career ==
In 1995, the Universidade Aberta created the first master's degree program for women's studies in Portugal and Joaquim was hired as the coordinator of the project. Both the drive for the founding of the program and the expansion of it to include PhD studies in 2002 were led by Joaquim. She was appointed by the Commission for Equality and the Rights of Women to serve as a member of the Ethics Council for Life Sciences in 1996. This body examines the ethical issues raised by life science innovation in biology, health, and medicine as it relates to society. In 1999, she collated a report for the Ethics Council, "Reflexão ética sobre a dignidade humana" (Ethical Reflection on Human Dignity), synthesizing the views of the council members regarding the concept of human dignity. During her term on the Ethics Council, which ended in 2002, she also served as the High Commissioner for the Promotion of Equality and Family Partnerships on the forums of the committee for equality of the Council of Europe, held in Estonia in 1997 and as the Portuguese representative for the Fundação para a Ciência e Tecnologia (Foundation for Science and Technology) on the Helsinki Group on Women in Science, which was formed in 1999 by the European Commission.

Her work on government policy led to Joaquim's permanent appointment in 2001 to teach at the Universidade Aberta. In 2004, she was appointed to serve a two-year term as Director of the Department of Social and Political Sciences at Universidade Aberta. She has served as coordinator and vice coordinator of the degree program for social sciences. In May 2021, Joaquim was reviewed by a jury and promoted to the academic rank of Agregado The following month, she was appointed to serve a two-year term as the Researcher Ombudsman for the Extraordinary General Assembly of the Instituto de História Contemporânea (Institute of Contemporary History), which is located at Universidade Nova de Lisboa.

== Research ==
Joaquim's Dar à luz evaluated the acceptance by Portuguese women of pregnancy and birth as being part of their nature. She analyzed how until the child arrived, traditionally, no medical intervention occurred, because women helped each other take care of their own health. Each phase of women's lives were controlled from menstruation, to conception and childbirth through various social prohibitions over her body, passed through women's networks by sharing their knowledge and experience of the changes of the body. She returned to female culture in Mulheres de uma aldeia, interviewing women in rural villages about sexually segregated work. Her analysis showed that even though men had predominantly shifted away from agricultural work leaving it in charge of women, beliefs regarding family systems had not changed. Men were still seen as the sole workers, supporting the family and managing the household finances. Women did not question that they now had to balance fieldwork with domestic duties and did not view their contributions as support for the family. Based on the testimony collected from village women, marriage was seen as necessary for providing security for the family and children (or the lack of them) was seen as a reward or punishment for living a good or evil life, thus the use of contraception was considered as unnatural. Her works often explored the invisibility of women and the difficulty of addressing their problems because the issues they faced were unidentified and not spoken about.

Menina e moça: a construção social da feminilidade, séculos XVII-XIX (Girl and Miss: The Social Construction of Femininity, 17th–19th Centuries, 1997) expanded further on the question of whether or not there was a feminine nature or whether instead the way that girls were brought up and taught how to act, think of their body, and interact, were what defined womanhood. These were themes she had studied in her doctoral thesis and she concluded that for societal change to occur, education would need to be broadened in how women were taught to think of themselves. That study led to further research conducted by Joaquim and Fernanda Henriques in 1995, which produced a report, Os materiais pedagógicos e o desenvolvimento de uma educação para a igualdade entre os sexo (Pedagogical Materials and the Development of an Education for Equality between the Sexes). The work was prepared for the Commission for Equality and Rights of Women to analyze gender stereotypes encountered in primary and secondary education textbooks. Other studies confirmed the gender biases in textbooks and as a result of the 2008 recommendations of the CEDAW Committee, the government of Portugal created an action plan to produce a series of educational materials known as the Education Guide: Gender and Citizenship. Joaquim has been involved conducting research for several of the volumes in the series, which are designed as four levels for pre-school through secondary education of both theoretical and practical guidelines. In addition, she has worked with the Advanced Thematic Network for Women's Studies in Europe (ATHENA), a network sponsored by the European Commission, to produce guidelines and academic collaboration at the tertiary level for the advancement of women's studies programs.

== Selected works ==
- Joaquim, Teresa (1983). Dar à luz, ensaio sobre as práticas e crenças da gravidez, parto e pós-parto em Portugal [Giving Birth: Essay on the Practices and Beliefs of Pregnancy, Childbirth and Postpartum in Portugal] (in Portuguese). Lisbon: Publicações Dom Quixote. OCLC 1024932492.
- Joaquim, Teresa; Gonzalez, Manuela (1985). Mulheres de uma aldeia [Women of a Village]. Fémina (in Portuguese). Vol. 3. Lisbon: Ulmeiro. OCLC 16354603.
- Joaquim, Teresa (1997). Menina e moça: a construção social da feminilidade, séculos XVII-XIX [Girl and Miss: The Social Construction of Femininity, 17th–19th Centuries] (in Portuguese). Lisbon: Fim de Século. ISBN 978-972-754-103-4.
- Joaquim, Teresa (2004). As causas das mulheres: a comunidade infigurável [Women's Causes: The Unfigurable Community]. Mulher e a sociedade (in Portuguese). Lisbon: Livros Horizonte. ISBN 978-972-24-1356-5.
- Joaquim, Teresa (2006). Cuidar dos outros, cuidar de sí: questões em torno da maternidade [Taking Care of Others, Taking Care of Oneself: Issues around Motherhood] (in Portuguese) (First ed.). Lisbon: Livros Horizonte. ISBN 978-972-24-1429-6.
- Amâncio, Lígia; Tavares, Manuela; Joaquim, Teresa; de Almeida, Teresa S., eds. (2007). O longo caminho das mulheres: feminismos 80 anos depois [The Long Path of Women: Feminisms 80 Years Later] (in Portuguese) (1st ed.). Lisbon: Publicações Dom Quixote. ISBN 978-972-20-3320-6.
- Joaquim, Teresa, ed. (2010). Masculinidades / feminilidades [Masculinities / Femininities]. Colecção Textos (in Portuguese). Vol. 82. Porto: Edições Afrontamento. ISBN 978-972-36-1101-4.
