= Instituto Superior de Ciências da Saúde Egas Moniz =

Portuguese private medical school

Coordinates: 38°40′4″N 9°11′56″W

Egas Moniz School of Health & Science
- Instituto Superior de Ciências da Saúde Egas Moniz
- Type: Private school
- Established: 1987
- Students: 4000
- Location: Almada, Portugal
- Colours: Blue and Yellow
- Website: http://www.egasmoniz.edu.pt

Egas Moniz School of Health & Science (formerly Instituto Superior de Ciências da Saúde Egas Moniz ISCSEM) is the largest private institute of learning in Portugal dedicated to higher studies in the medical field. Founded in 1987 it currently offers 50 degrees, Bachelor's programs, Integrated Master's programs, Post Graduation programs, Master's programs and PhD's programs .

== Degrees ==
Pharmacy, Veterinary Medicine, Nutrition, Biomedical Science, Forensic Science, Criminal Psychology

== Integrated Masters Degrees ==
Pharmacy, Dentistry, Veterinary Medicine

== See also ==
- List of colleges and universities in Portugal
