= Universidade Aberta =

Distance education university in Portugal

Coordinates: 38°43′03.5″N 09°09′07.37″W

Portuguese Open University
- Universidade Aberta
- Motto: Em qualquer lugar do Mundo
- Motto in English: In any place of the world
- Type: Public distance education
- Established: 1988
- Rector: Carla Padrel de Oliveira
- Students: 13,170 (2010)
- Location: Lisbon, Portugal
- Website: portal.uab.pt

Universidade Aberta (UAb) is a public distance education university in Portugal. Established in 1988, UAb offers higher education (undergraduate, master and doctorate degrees) and Lifelong Learning study programs. All programs are taught in e-learning mode since 2008, the year that UAb became a European institution of reference in the area of advanced e-learning and online learning through the recognition of its exclusive Virtual Pedagogical Model.

It was the first university in Portugal to introduce a women's studies program. The master's degree of Women's Studies – Gender, Citizenship and Development was launched in 1995 under the direction of Teresa Joaquim and expanded into a PhD program as well in 2002.

== See also ==
- List of universities in Portugal
- Higher education in Portugal
