= Liberalism in Portugal =

Since the beginning of liberalism in Portugal in the 19th century, several parties have, by gaining representation in parliament, continued the liberal ideology in contemporary Portuguese politics. After the initial fervor of the Liberal Revolution of 1820 and the outcome of the Liberal Wars (1828–1834) during the 19th century, liberalism was relegated to a secondary role in Portuguese politics and government and even outlawed for periods of time. The first fully-fledged liberal party (a political party professing classical liberalism including pro-market, business-friendly economic liberalism, small government and individual freedom as core tenets of its ideology) founded as such to have a seat in the Portuguese Parliament since the end of the First Portuguese Republic (1910–1926), was the Liberal Initiative, in 2019.

== History ==
=== 1826 to 1926 ===
==== From Democratic Group to New Progressive Party ====
- 1826: Supporters of the liberal revolution of 1820 establish the Democratic Group (Grupo Democrata)
- 1840: The party is reorganized into the Progress Party (Partido do Progresso), founded by João de Saldanha
- 1849: The New Progressive Party merges with the conservative Regenerator Party (Partido Regenerador)
- 1851: A faction leaves the party and founds the Progressive Historical Party/Party of Historical Progressives (Partido Progressista Histórico/Partido dos Progressistas Históricos)
- 1862: The Progressive Historical Party is split into the Reformist Party and the Historical Party (Partido Histórico)
- 1876: Both parties reunite and merge into the New Progressive Party (Novo Partido Progressista), which eventually develops into a Conservative party
- 1910: The New Progressive Party dissolves.

==== Portuguese Republican Party ====
- 1872: Revolutionary and radical liberals establish the Portuguese Republican Party (Partido Republicano Português)
- 1891: The Portuguese Republican Party is banned.
- 1906: It is reestablished.
- 1910: The newly radicalized party stages a revolution and its leader Joaquim Teófilo Braga becomes Prime Minister of Portugal.
- 1911: Liberal and moderate factions of the Portuguese Republican Party (Partido Republicano Português) form the Republican National Union (União Nacional Republicano) which secedes.
- 1912: The Republican National Union is split and liberals establish the Evolutionist Republican Party (Partido Republicano Evolucionista), led by António José de Almeida. The conservative wing in the split continues as the Republican Union. The radical remains of the Portuguese Republican Party rebranded themselves as Democratic Party (Partido Democrático).
- 1919: The Republican Union and the Evolutionist Republican Party merged into the conservative Republican Liberal Party(Partido Republicano Liberal) and the liberals form the Popular Portuguese Party (Partido Português Popular)
- 1920: The National Reconstituted Republican Party secedes, leaving the Portuguese Republican Party as an intransigent radical, such as the Jacobine party which is banned in 1926. Liberal elements from the Portuguese Republican Party form the National Reconstituted Republican Party (Partido Republicano Reconstituente Nacional)
- 1922: The Portuguese Republic Party is renamed Radical Party (Partido Radical)
- 1923: The Republican Action Party was merged into the conservative Nationalist Republican Party (Partido Republicano Nacionalista), but later that year it is refounded as the Republican Action (Acção Republicana)
- 1925: Left-wing dissidents of the Republican Party/Democratic Party formed the Democratic Leftwing Republican Party (Partido Republicano Esquerdista Democrático) and the Reformist Party.
- 1926: The Republic Action Party is banned.

=== 1985 onwards ===
==== Social Democratic Party ====
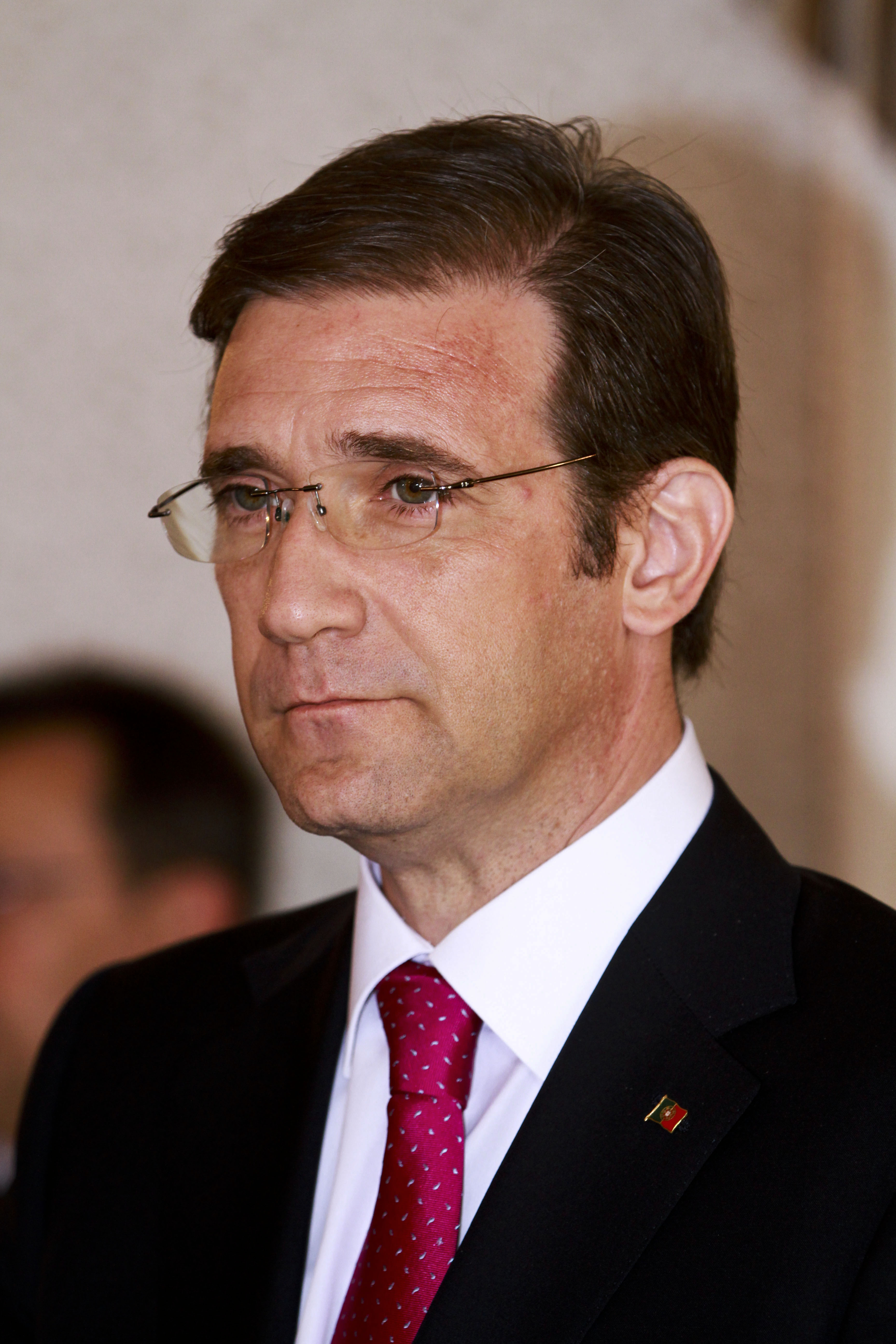
Pedro Passos Coelho, Prime Minister of Portugal from 2011 to 2015.

Francisco Sá Carneiro became a member of the Portuguese National Assembly in 1969 under the Estado Novo dictatorial regime (1933-1974) and, in turn, one of the leaders of the "Liberal Wing" (Ala Liberal) of the National Assembly (the Portuguese legislature during the Estado Novo regime) which attempted to work for the gradual transformation of António de Oliveira Salazar's dictatorship into a Western European liberal democracy. In May 1974, a month after the Carnation Revolution, Sá Carneiro and others founded the Popular Democratic Party (PPD) the original name of the Social Democratic Party (PSD). The Social Democratic Party was a full right member of the Liberal International, from 1985 until 1996. The party leaned towards economic liberalism since Aníbal Cavaco Silva served as Prime Minister of Portugal from 1985 to 1995 (a period marked by high economic growth in the country) and later as President of Portugal from 2006 to 2016. From June 2011 to November 2015, after a IMF-European Union orchestrated bailout to the insolvent Portuguese Republic has been requested by the incumbent Prime Minister José Sócrates of the Socialist Party on 6 April 2011, Pedro Passos Coelho of the Social Democratic Party served as Prime Minister and his policies and proposals, in accordance with the recommendations made by the European troika to the Portuguese Republic, were regarded by the left as aligned with economic liberalism after decades of left-leaning, labor movement-inspired policies enacted by Portuguese socialist politicians and their political allies before the ultimate signals of financial collapse of the Republic arose in 2010. However, many of Pedro Passos Coelho cabinet's proposals from 2011 to 2015 didn't pass due to the anti-liberal, labor movement-inspired Portuguese law.

==== Social Liberal Movement ====
- 2005: The Social Liberal Movement (Movimento Liberal Social, MLS) is founded as a movement (not a political party). The current president is Miguel Duarte.

==== Liberal Initiative ====
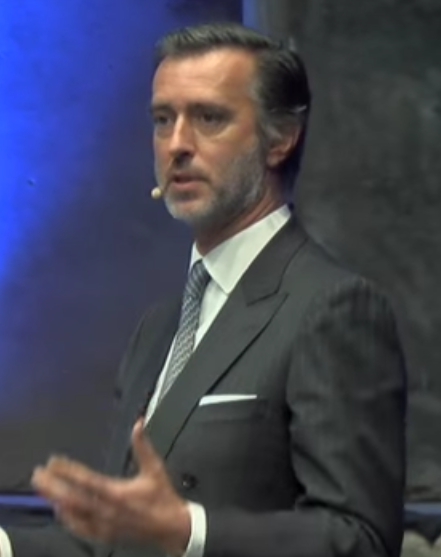
João Cotrim de Figueiredo, the first ever elected Member of the Portuguese Parliament for the Liberal Initiative.

- 2017: The Liberal Initiative, a liberal party in the right-liberal European tradition, is founded and becomes a full member of the ALDE European Party. In 2019, its debut year at the Portuguese legislative elections, the party won one seat in the Portuguese Parliament. The party supported its first government coalition, at regional level, after the 2020 Azorean regional election. It won 30 seats in municipal councils in its first ever local elections. In the 2022 legislative election, the party added seven new seats in the Portuguese Parliament for a total of eight MPs.

==== Democracia 21 ====
- 2018: Democracia 21 (D21) was founded. Sofia Afonso Ferreira became its leader.

== Political parties ==
School	Party	Leaders
Liberalism	Liberal Initiative	Carlos Guimarães Pinto; João Cotrim de Figueiredo; Rui Rocha
Conservative liberalism	Social Democratic Party	Pedro Passos Coelho

== See also ==
- Liberal Revolution of 1820
- Liberal Wars
- History of Portugal
- Politics of Portugal
- List of political parties in Portugal
