= Polytechnic University of Castelo Branco =

The Polytechnic Institute of Castelo Branco (Instituto Politécnico de Castelo Branco) is a state-run polytechnic institute of higher education, comprising schools of agriculture, technology, management, education, art and health. It is headquartered in the city of Castelo Branco where most of its schools operate and has a business management school in the neighboring town of Idanha-a-Nova. The first two schools of this institution opened in 1982 - ESA - Escola Superior Agrária (agronomy) and 1985 - ESE - Escola Superior de Educação (education).

IPCB is involved in various research projects, both independently and in collaboration with other institutions. The IPCB also maintains partnerships with several international institutions, offering opportunities for students to study abroad and for faculty members to engage in research collaborations.
