= Liberal Initiative =

Liberal political party in Portugal

Liberal Initiative Iniciativa Liberal
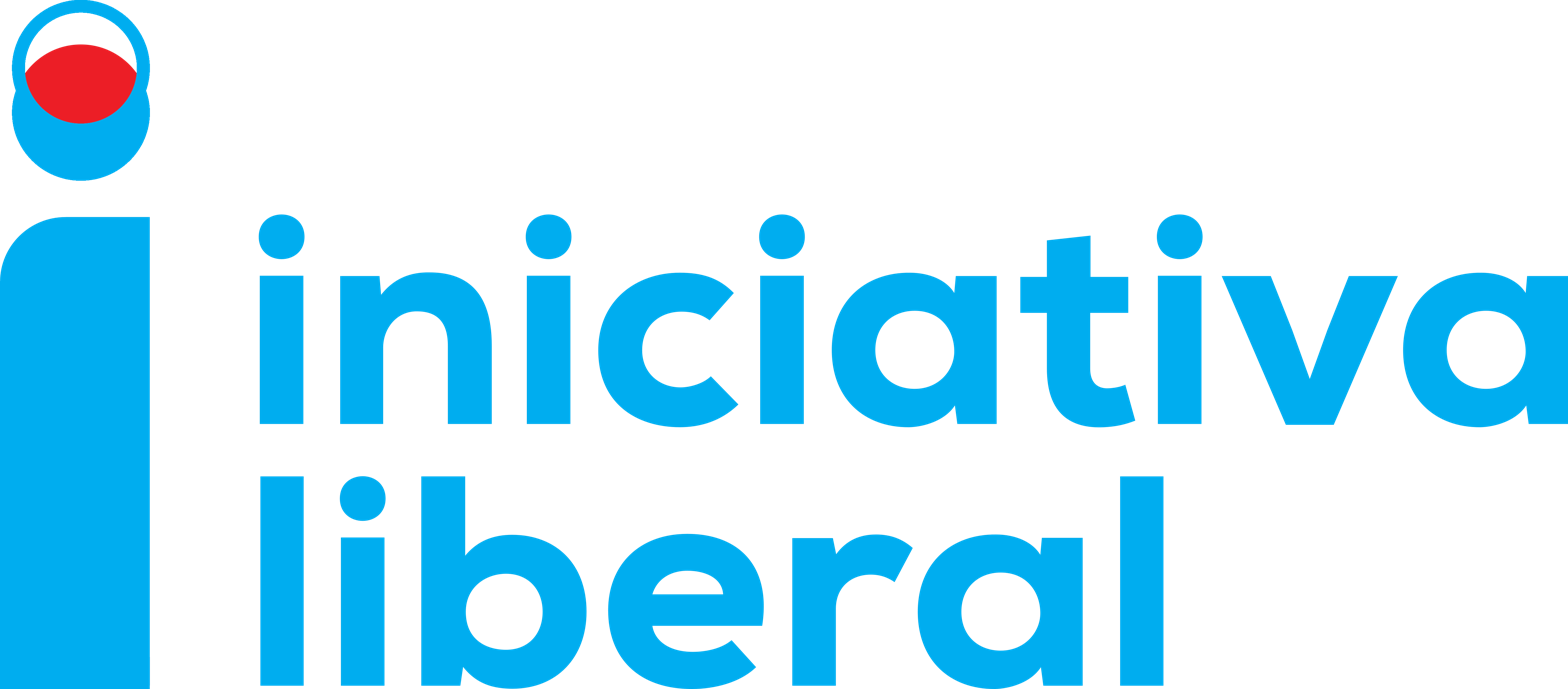
- Abbreviation: IL
- President: Mariana Leitão
- Secretary-General: Rui Ribeiro
- Vice presidents: Ricardo Pais Oliveira; Mário Amorim Lopes; André Abrantes Amaral; Paulo Trezentos
- Founded: 13 December 2017
- Headquarters: Avenida do Bessa, 158 E 4100-012 Porto
- Membership (2025): ▲7,258
- Ideology: Liberalism (Portuguese); Libertarianism
- Political position: Centre-right to right-wing
- European affiliation: Alliance of Liberals and Democrats for Europe
- European Parliament group: Renew Europe
- Colours: Sky Blue
- Assembly of the Republic: 9 / 230 (4%)
- European Parliament: 2 / 21 (10%)
- Regional Parliaments: 2 / 104
- Local government (Mayors): 0 / 308
- Local government (Parishes): 2 / 3,216

Election symbol
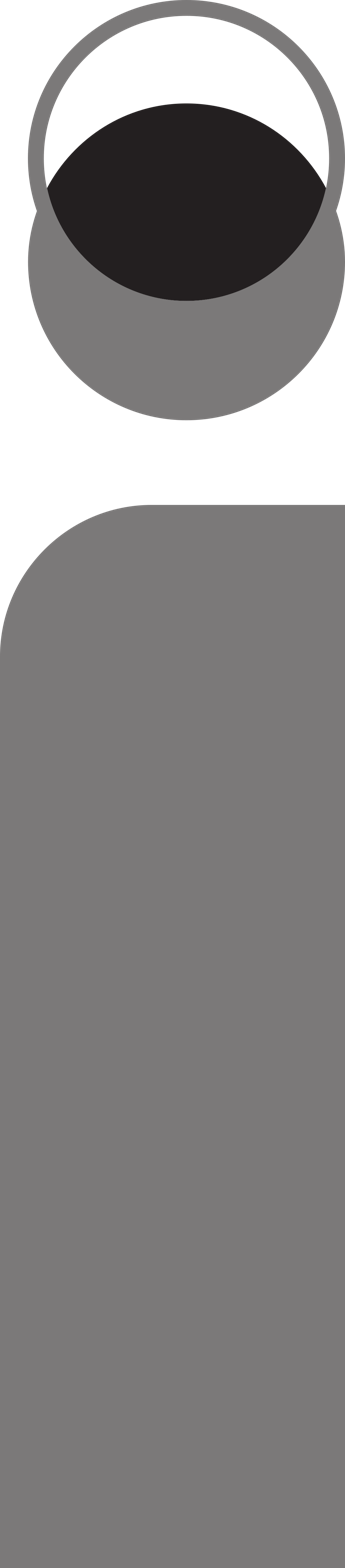

Party flag
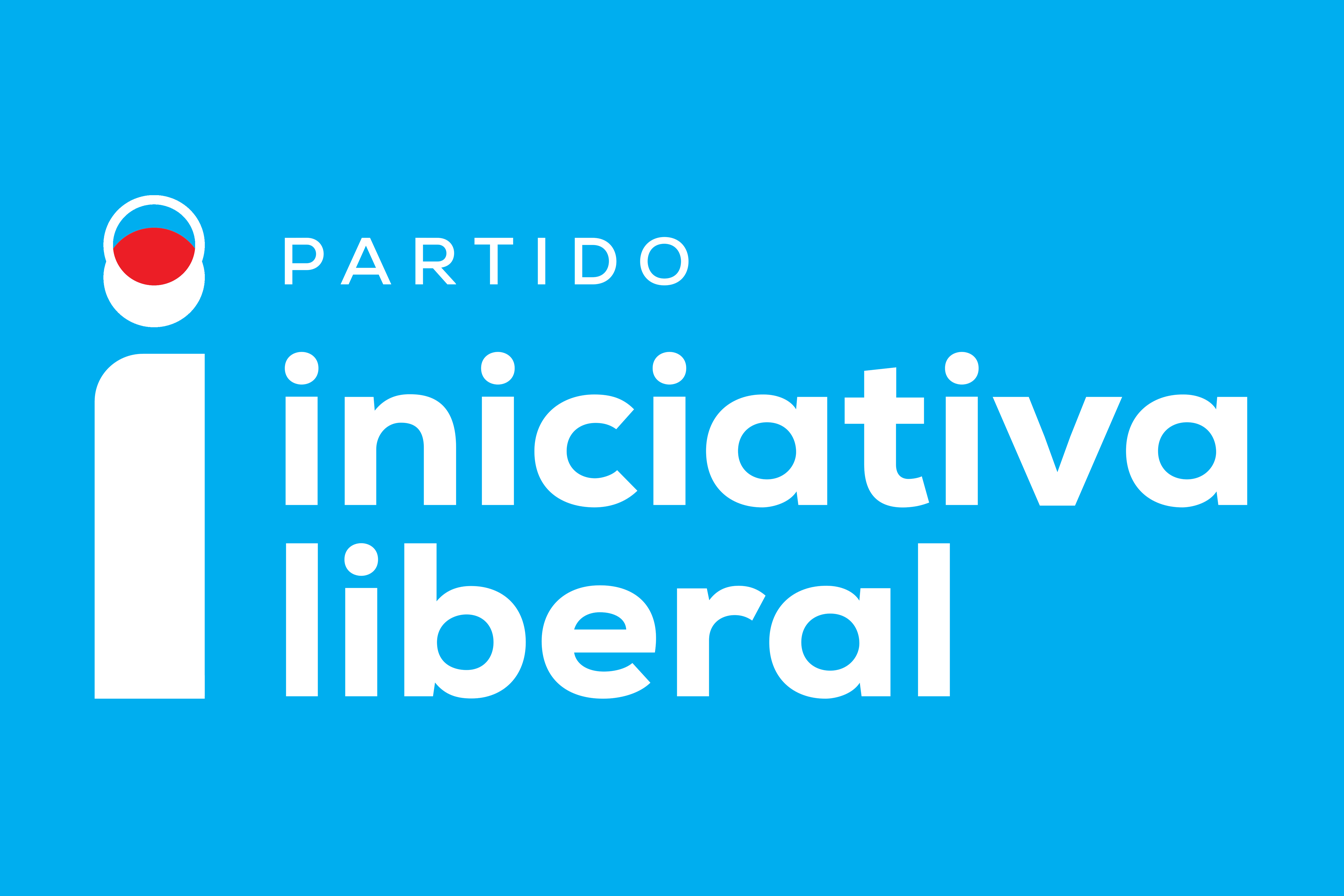

Website
- iniciativaliberal.pt

The Liberal Initiative (Portuguese: Iniciativa Liberal [inisjɐˈtivɐ liβɨˈɾal], IL) is a liberal and libertarian political party in Portugal. Founded in 2017, it is currently led by Mariana Leitão, who was elected in July 2025. The party has been described as being on the political right by academics and journalists. It has 9 elected seats out of a total of 230 in the Portuguese Parliament.

The party was founded in December 2017, and in October 2019, its debut year at the Portuguese legislative elections, it won one seat in the Portuguese Parliament. It had run in its first elections in May 2019 for the European Parliament and in 2020 supported its first government coalition, at regional level, after the 2020 Azorean regional election.

The party espouses a liberal economic platform, supporting a simplification and reduction of the tax burden, liberalisation of the labour market, an equitable and universal welfare state, as well as cultural and secular liberalism.

== History ==
The Liberal Initiative was founded as an association in 2016, and was approved as a party by the Constitutional Court in 2017. It was admitted to the Alliance of Liberals and Democrats for Europe Party, a European political party, in November 2017, having run for election for the first time in the 2019 European Parliament election in Portugal, garnering 0.9% of the votes, and failing to win any seats in the European Parliament. In the 2019 legislative election, the party won a single seat in the Portuguese Parliament through the electoral district of Lisbon, earning 67,681 votes in total, equivalent to 1.3% of the votes cast. At the regional level, IL supported its first government coalition after the 2020 Azorean regional election. In the 2021 Portuguese local elections, it won 26 seats in municipal assemblies, and none in municipal councils. In the 2022 legislative election, the Liberal Initiative party increased the number of its MPs from one to eight with 5.0% of the vote. Besides João Cotrim Figueiredo (already an MP at the Portuguese Parliament and incumbent party leader), IL elected seven new MPs for the party, including Carlos Guimarães Pinto (a former party leader), as MPs.

== Ideology and platform ==
The party has been described as liberal, libertarian, neoliberal, conservative liberal, and social liberal. It has been described as centre-right and right-wing.

According to its own official statements about this topic, the Liberal Initiative was founded with the Oxford Manifesto in mind and believes in individual freedom, by which all individuals have fundamental rights, including the possibility of having a life of their own, owning property or choosing how they want to live in their community, closely following the principles of classical liberalism. The party's conception of freedom encompasses both the economic and social spheres as well as the political and individual spheres, and believes that if any of them are restricted, freedom ceases to exist. The party's political ideas are based on the idea of freedom as the greatest engine of human development, social harmony and economic prosperity. The party's leaders and founders have ascertained that they envisage Portugal as a country that will model itself on Germany's multi-payer health care system – which is paid for by a combination of public health insurance and private health insurance – on Ireland's corporate tax policy and on Estonia's fiscal, educational, and public administration systems, following classical liberal economic policies.

On 5 May 2018, the Liberal Initiative approved its political programme under the slogan "Less State, More Freedom" (Menos Estado, Mais Liberdade). The party proposes the reduction of the number of civil servants and the extension of their health system to all Portuguese citizens, as well as extending the freedom for parents to choose their children's school without it necessarily being linked to their address.

The party, which describes itself as a big-tent liberal party, rejects the political philosophy of libertarianism, arguing that while it defends a reduction in the size of the state and opposes economic interventionism in principle, it also defends an effective government which guarantees the rule of law, universal healthcare, universal education, social security and a welfare state. The party does not favour the dismantling of the Portuguese welfare state, instead defending its rationalisation based on the principles of "sustainability and equity" towards both social welfare beneficiaries and taxpayers, regardless of individual demographic factors.

=== Platform for the 2019 legislative election ===
Among the measures announced for the 2019 parliamentary elections were:

- Introducing a flat income tax rate of 15%.
- Extending coverage by the ADSE ("Instituto de Proteção e Assistência na Doença") to all Portuguese citizens. This body is in charge of health care, and works like a health insurance, for the Portuguese civil servants only.
- Providing freedom of choice of school in both the state-owned and privately owned systems, through a school-voucher system.
- Granting more freedom for universities to define admission criteria, and following the American and British models for universities by adopting a student loan funding system.

== Party factions ==
The Liberal Initiative has a number of internal factions:

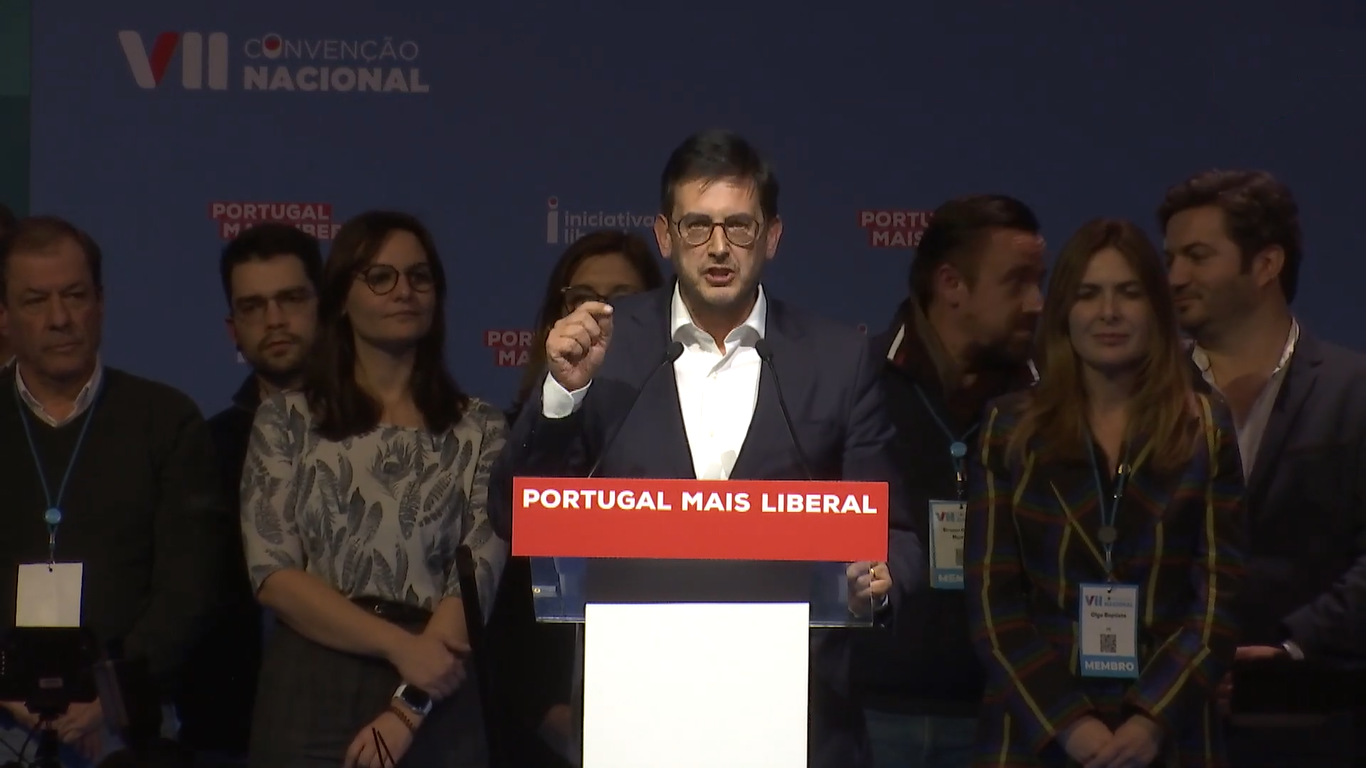
Rui Rocha, former party leader

=== Classical liberalism ===
This faction defends opposition to socialism through classical liberalism, calling for a low tax burden and promoting "efficient, effective and accountable government", while defending respect for individual, social, political and economic freedoms.

=== Social liberalism ===
This faction adheres to the principles of social liberalism. In 2024, a former candidate to the leadership of IL left the party and tried to establish a new party called the Social Liberal Party.

=== Conservative liberalism ===
The faction supporting conservative liberalism, although being liberal on economic issues, is more conservative on social issues. By 25 November 2023, most of the members from this faction had left the party, with two joining Chega.

== Organization ==
=== Structure and communication ===
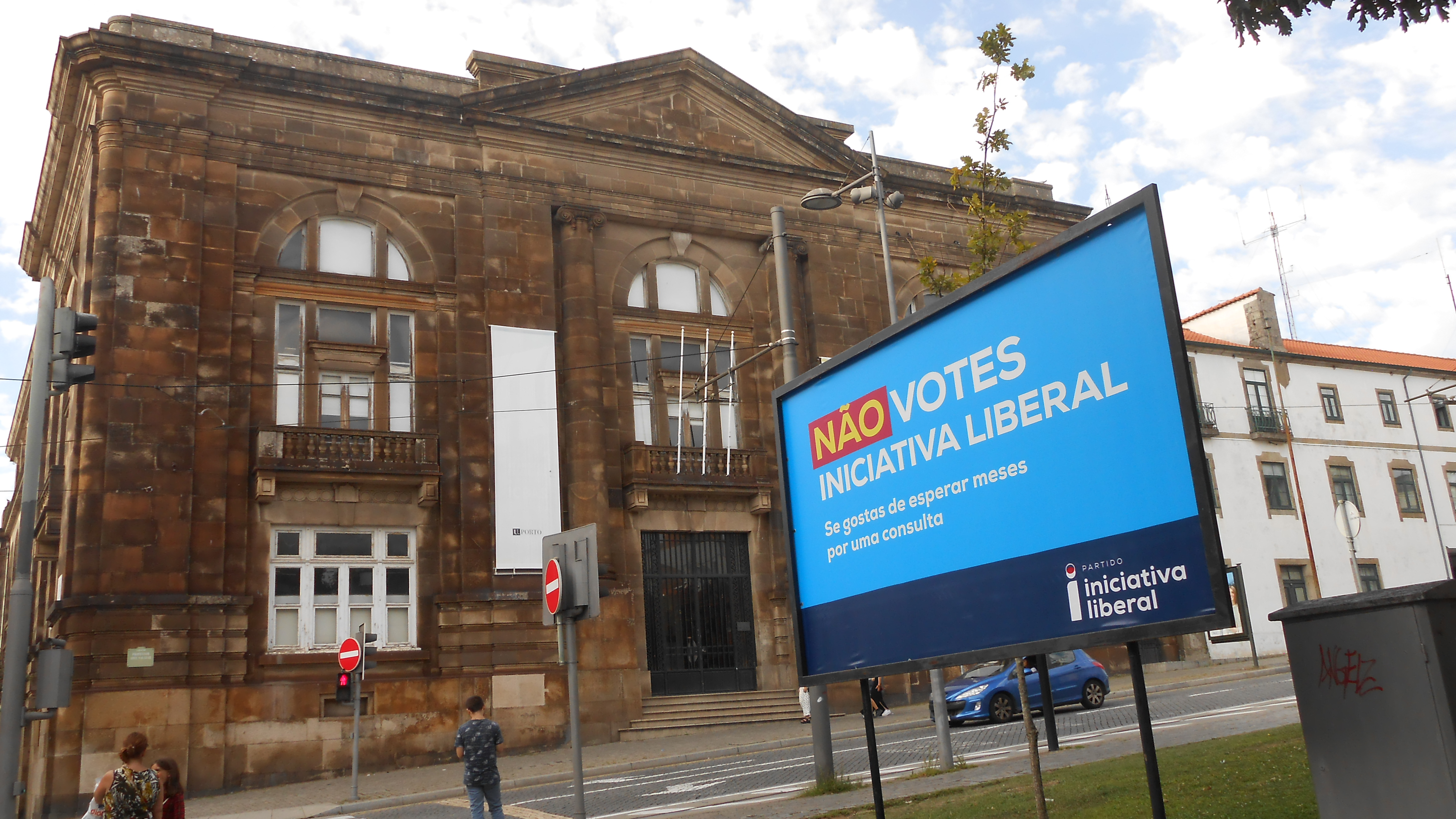
Outdoor

The party is organized and managed in a decentralized, digitized manner. It has no physical headquarters in most municipalities of the country and makes heavy use of information and communication technologies. Since its foundation, the party made an impact through the originality of its communication and marketing campaigns, in particular its eye-catching billboards.

=== Leadership ===
==== List of presidents ====
Name		Portrait	Constituency	Tenure			Prime Minister
Name		Portrait	Constituency	Start	End	Duration	Prime Minister
1	Miguel Ferreira da Silva (b. 1972)		Lisbon	26 November 2017	13 October 2018	321 days	António Costa (2015–2024)
2	Carlos Guimarães Pinto (b. 1983)		Porto	13 October 2018	8 December 2019	1 year, 56 days	António Costa (2015–2024)
3	João Cotrim de Figueiredo (b. 1961)		Lisbon	8 December 2019	22 January 2023	3 years, 45 days	António Costa (2015–2024)
4	Rui Rocha (b. 1970)		Braga	22 January 2023	31 May 2025	2 years, 129 days	António Costa (2015–2024)
4	Rui Rocha (b. 1970)		Braga	22 January 2023	31 May 2025	2 years, 129 days	Luís Montenegro (since 2024)
–	Miguel Rangel (interim) (b. 1976)		Porto	31 May 2025	19 July 2025	49 days	Luís Montenegro (since 2024)
5	Mariana Leitão (b. 1982)		Lisbon	19 July 2025	Incumbent	1 year, 124 days	Luís Montenegro (since 2024)

=== Elected politicians ===
==== Members of the Assembly of the Republic ====
17th Legislature (2025 – present)
- Mariana Leitão (Lisbon)
- Rodrigo Saraiva (Lisbon)
- Angélique da Teresa (Lisbon)
- Jorge Miguel Teixeira (Lisbon)
- Carlos Guimarães Pinto (Porto)
- Miguel Rangel (Porto)
- Rui Rocha (Braga)
- Joana Cordeiro (Setúbal)
- Mário Amorim Lopes (Aveiro)
16th Legislature (2024–2025)
- Bernardo Blanco (Lisbon)
  André Abrantes Amaral – from February 2025 to March 2025
- Mariana Leitão (Lisbon)
- Rodrigo Saraiva (Lisbon)
- Carlos Guimarães Pinto (Porto)
  Albino Ramos – from December 2024 to January 2025
- Patrícia Gilvaz (Porto)
- Rui Rocha (Braga)
- Joana Cordeiro (Setúbal)
- Mário Amorim Lopes (Aveiro)
15th Legislature (2022–2024)
- João Cotrim de Figueiredo (Lisbon)
- Carla Castro (Lisbon)
- Rodrigo Saraiva (Lisbon)
- Bernardo Blanco (Lisbon)
- Carlos Guimarães Pinto (Porto)
- Patrícia Gilvaz (Porto)
- Rui Rocha (Braga)
- Joana Cordeiro (Setúbal)
14th Legislature (2019–2022)
- João Cotrim de Figueiredo (Lisbon)

==== Members of the European Parliament ====
10th Legislature (2024 – present)
- João Cotrim de Figueiredo
- Ana Martins

== Election results ==
=== Assembly of the Republic ===
Vote share in the Portuguese legislative elections

Election	Candidate	Votes	%	Seats	+/-	Government
2019	Carlos Guimarães Pinto	67,681	1.3 (#8)	1 / 230	New	Opposition
2022	João Cotrim de Figueiredo	273,687	4.9 (#4)	8 / 230	▲7	Opposition
2024	Rui Rocha	319,877	4.9 (#4)	8 / 230	0	Opposition
2025	Rui Rocha	338,974	5.4 (#4)	9 / 230	▲1	Opposition

=== Presidential ===
Election	Candidate	First round		Second round		Result
Election	Candidate	Votes	%	Votes	%	Result
2021	Tiago Mayan Gonçalves	134,991	3.2 (#6)			Lost ✗
2026	João Cotrim de Figueiredo	903,057	16.0 (#3)			Lost ✗

=== European Parliament ===
Election	Candidate	Votes	%	Seats	+/–	EP Group
2019	Ricardo Arroja	29,114	0.9 (#11)	0 / 21		–
2024	João Cotrim de Figueiredo	358,811	9.1 (#4)	2 / 21	▲2	RE

=== Local elections ===
Includes members elected within coalitions with IL.

Election	Leader	Votes	%	Mayors	+/-	Councillors	+/-	Assemblies	+/-	Parishes	+/-	Parish Assemblies	+/-
2021	João Cotrim Figueiredo	64,849	1.3 (#8)	0 / 308	New	1 / 2,064	New	30 / 6,448	New	0 / 3,066	New	58 / 26,797	New
2025	Mariana Leitão	87,809	1.6 (#6)	0 / 308	0	9 / 2,058	▲8	90 / 6,463	▲60	2 / 3,216	▲2	178 / 27,973	▲120

=== Regional Assemblies ===
Region	Election	Candidate	Votes	%	Seats	+/-	Government
Azores	2024	Nuno Barata	2,482	2.2 (#5)	1 / 57	0	Opposition
Madeira	2025	Gonçalo Maia Camelo	3,097	2.2 (#6)	1 / 47	0	Opposition
