= Polytechnic University of Cávado and Ave =

The Polytechnic Institute of Cávado and Ave, (Portuguese: Instituto Politécnico do Cávado e do Ave), is the youngest polytechnic institute in Portugal. It was created on December 19, 1994, in Barcelos, with two higher Schools: the Management School and the Technology School.

The Management School provides four degree courses: Accounting and Public Finance, Management Accounting, Taxation and Solicitorship. The Technology School provides four degrees as well: Health Informatics, Graphic Design, Industrial Design and Management Information Systems.

As of 2007 both schools counted over 1400 students enrolled in the various courses degrees available.
