= Polytechnic University of Viana do Castelo =

- Universidade Politécnica de Viana do Castelo
- Rector: Carlos Manuel da Silva Rodrigues (2019 - Present)
- Students: ~6000
- Location: Viana do Castelo, Portugal
- Website: www.unipvc.pt

The Polytechnic University of Viana do Castelo (Instituto Politécnico de Viana do Castelo) is a state-run polytechnic university of higher education in Portugal. Its five schools are located in several cities of the Viana do Castelo district in Portugal. It was established on 16 August 1980.

== Schools ==
- Escola Superior de Educação (Viana do Castelo)
- Escola Superior Agrária (Ponte de Lima)
- Escola Superior de Tecnologia e Gestão (Viana do Castelo)
- Escola Superior de Enfermagem (Viana do Castelo)
- Escola Superior de Ciências Empresariais (Valença)
