= João Cotrim de Figueiredo =

Portuguese businessman and politician (born 1961)

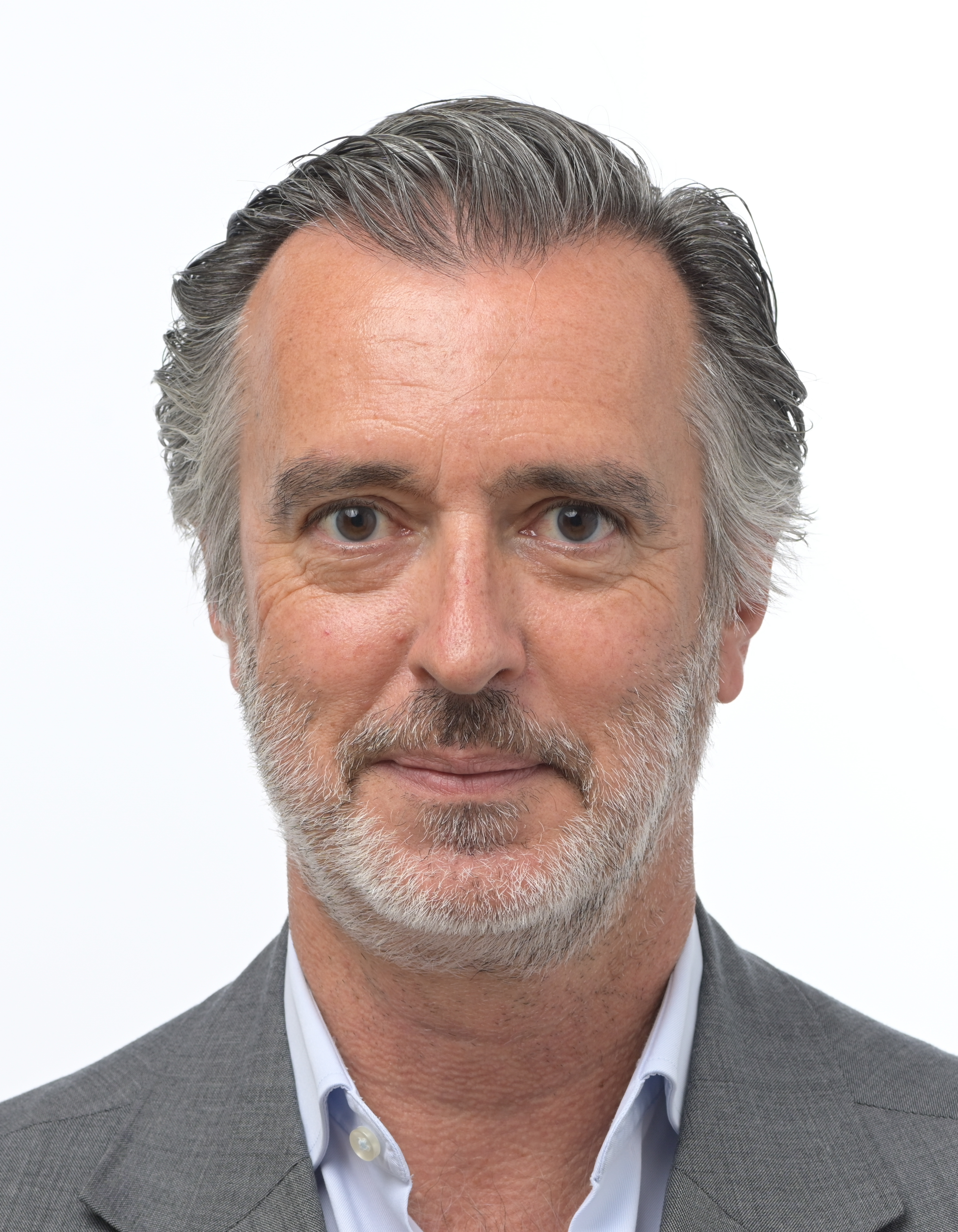
- Official portrait, 2024

President of the Liberal Initiative
- In office 8 December 2019 – 22 January 2023
- Secretary-General: Miguel Rangel
- Preceded by: Carlos Guimarães Pinto
- Succeeded by: Rui Rocha

Member of the European Parliament
- Incumbent
- Assumed office 16 July 2024
- Constituency: Portugal

Member of the Assembly of the Republic
- In office 25 October 2019 – 25 March 2024
- Constituency: Lisbon

Personal details
- Born: João Fernando Cotrim de Figueiredo; 24 June 1961 (age 65) Lisbon, Portugal
- Party: Liberal Initiative
- Spouse: Patrícia Poppe (m. 1987; div. 2010)
- Children: 4
- Education: London School of Economics; NOVA University Lisbon
- Occupation: Businessman • Politician

João Fernando Cotrim de Figueiredo (born 24 June 1961) is a Portuguese businessman and politician of the Liberal Initiative who has been serving as a Member of the European Parliament since the 2024 European election.

Cotrim de Figueiredo was the party's first member of the Assembly of the Republic, for Lisbon, in October 2019. He was the leader of the party between October 2019 and January 2023, during which the party won eight seats in the 2022 election. He was a candidate in the 2026 Portuguese presidential election.

== Early life and education ==
Cotrim de Figueiredo was born and grew up in Lisbon, where he sold clothes hangers door-to-door for a company established by his great-grandfather. He attended the German School of Lisbon before studying Economics at the London School of Economics, and then obtained a Master's in Business Administration from the NOVA University Lisbon.

== Early career ==
While studying in London, Cotrim de Figueiredo supported himself with jobs including serving cocktails at the Serpentine Galleries, later reflecting that workers were looked at with contempt at such events.

Cotrim de Figueiredo worked in executive positions at Compal, Nutricafés, Privado Holding and TVI. In 2015 he was elected vice president of the European Travel Commission. He was the president of Turismo de Portugal, a governmental entity, from December 2013 to February 2016.

== Political career ==
2026 João Cotrim de Figueiredo presidential campaign
- Campaign: President of Portugal in the 2026 Portuguese presidential election
- Candidate: João Cotrim de Figueiredo, Member of the European Parliament (2024–present)
- Affiliation: Liberal Initiative
- Status: Announcement: 13 August 2025; Campaign launch: 2 November 2025; Campaign formalized: 3 November 2025; Defeat: 18 January 2026
- Key people: José Miguel Júdice (campaign chair); Bernardo Blanco (campaign director)
- Slogan: Imagina Portugal (Imagine Portugal)

Website
- cotrim2026.pt

In July 2019, Cotrim de Figueiredo was chosen to head the Liberal Initiative's list in Lisbon for the October legislative elections. He became the party's only Assembly member, in their first elections.

After the resignation of Carlos Guimarães Pinto, Cotrim de Figueiredo ran for leader of the party in December 2019 and was elected with 96% of the votes.

In the snap election in January 2022, the Liberal Initiative received 5% of all votes, rising from one seat to eight and forming a parliamentary group. Cotrim de Figueiredo said that the group would be a firm opposition to socialism.

On 22 January 2023, Cotrim de Figueiredo was succeeded as leader of the Liberal Initiative by Rui Rocha, whom he had endorsed.

=== Member of the European Parliament, 2024–present ===
In the 2024 European Parliament election in Portugal, Cotrim de Figueiredo led the Liberal Initiative list, which had two of the country's 21 members elected to the European Parliament.

With support of the Alliance of Liberals and Democrats for Europe Party (ALDE), Cotrim de Figueiredo announced his intention to challenge incumbent Valérie Hayer and ran for the leadership of the Renew Europe group of liberal MEPs, but withdrew. He was subsequently elected Hayer's deputy in leading the Renew Europe group and joined the Committee on Industry, Research and Energy.

=== Candidacy for 2026 presidential election ===
In August 2025, Cotrim de Figueiredo announced his candidacy for the 2026 Portuguese presidential election. Shortly before the vote, his campaign suffered a setback when his former advisor Inês Bichão accused him of past sexual assault in an Instagram post that was later deleted. Cotrim de Figueiredo swiftly denied the accusations, calling them an attempt to undermine his candidacy. Although he fell short of qualifying for the second round, he finished third and secured 16 percent of the vote.

== Political positions ==
Cotrim de Figueiredo has criticized the European Commission for delaying the implementation of the recommendations of the Draghi report on European economic competitiveness, arguing that the European Union faces an urgent economic challenge due to persistently low growth.

He has called for rapid action to strengthen competitiveness and innovation, as well as to reduce bureaucracy and regulatory burdens across Europe.

He has spoken out against the Russian invasion of Ukraine.

== Electoral history ==
Year	Election	Office	Party	Pos.	Votes		#	Status	Notes
Year	Election	Office	Party	Pos.	Total	%	#	Status	Notes
2019	Legislative election in Lisbon	Assembly of the Republic	IL	1/48	27,166	2.47 / 100.00	7th	Elected	
2022	Legislative election in Lisbon	Assembly of the Republic	IL	1/48	93,341	7.90 / 100.00	3rd	Elected	President of the Liberal Initiative from 2019 until 2023.
2024	Legislative election in Europe	Assembly of the Republic	IL	1/2	5,719	2.44 / 100.00	5th	Not elected	
2024	European Parliament election	European Parliament	IL	1/21	358,811	9.08 / 100.00	4th	Elected	
2026	Presidential election	President of the Republic	IL	—N/a	903,057	16.00 / 100.00	3rd	Not elected	

=== IL leadership election, 2019 ===
Ballot: 8 December 2019
Candidate	Votes	%
João Cotrim de Figueiredo	181	95.8
Blank/Invalid ballots	8	4.2
Turnout	189	
Source: Results

=== Legislative election, 2022 ===
Ballot: 30 January 2022
Party	Candidate	Votes	%	Seats	+/−
PS	António Costa	2,302,601	41.4	120	+12
PSD	Rui Rio	1,618,381	29.1	77	–2
Chega	André Ventura	399,659	7.2	12	+11
IL	João Cotrim Figueiredo	273,687	4.9	8	+7
BE	Catarina Martins	244,603	4.4	5	–14
CDU	Jerónimo de Sousa	238,920	4.3	6	–6
CDS–PP	Rodrigues dos Santos	89,181	1.6	0	–5
PAN	Inês Sousa Real	88,152	1.6	1	–3
Livre	Rui Tavares	71,232	1.3	1	±0
Other parties		91,299	1.6	0	±0
Blank/Invalid ballots		146,824	2.6	–	–
Turnout		5,564,539	51.46	230	±0
Source: Comissão Nacional de Eleições

=== European Parliament election, 2024 ===
Ballot: 9 June 2024
Party	Candidate	Votes	%	Seats	+/−
PS	Marta Temido	1,268,915	32.1	8	–1
AD	Sebastião Bugalho	1,229,895	31.1	7	±0
Chega	António Tânger Corrêa	387,068	9.8	2	+2
IL	João Cotrim de Figueiredo	358,811	9.1	2	+2
BE	Catarina Martins	168,107	4.3	1	–1
CDU	João Oliveira	162,630	4.1	1	–1
Livre	Francisco Paupério	148,572	3.8	0	±0
ADN	Joana Amaral Dias	54,120	1.4	0	±0
PAN	Pedro Fidalgo Marques	48,006	1.2	0	–1
Other parties		48,647	1.2	0	±0
Blank/Invalid ballots		77,208	2.0	–	–
Turnout		3,951,979	36.63	21	±0
Source: Comissão Nacional de Eleições

=== Presidential election, 2026 ===
Ballot: 18 January and 8 February 2026
Candidate	First round		Second round	
Candidate	Votes	%	Votes	%
António José Seguro	1,755,563	31.1	3,502,613	66.8
André Ventura	1,327,021	23.5	1,737,950	33.2
João Cotrim de Figueiredo	903,057	16.0		
Henrique Gouveia e Melo	695,377	12.3		
Luís Marques Mendes	637,442	11.3		
Catarina Martins	116,407	2.1		
António Filipe	92,644	1.6		
Manuel João Vieira	60,927	1.1		
Jorge Pinto	38,588	0.7		
André Pestana	10,897	0.2		
Humberto Correia	4,773	0.1		
Blank/Invalid ballots	125,840	–	275,414	–
Turnout	5,768,536	52.39	5,515,977	50.03
Source: Comissão Nacional de Eleições

== See also ==
- Liberalism in Portugal
