= Rodrigo Saraiva =

Portuguese politician

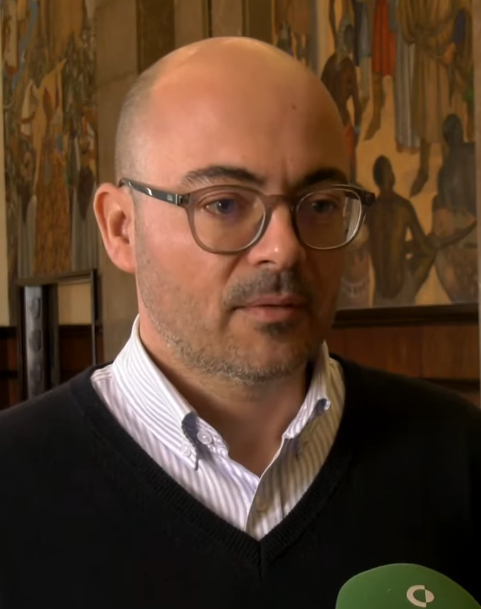
- Rodrigo Saraiva in 2023

Vice President of the Assembly of the Republic
- Incumbent
- Assumed office 27 March 2024
- President: José Pedro Aguiar-Branco

Member of the Assembly of the Republic
- Incumbent
- Assumed office 29 March 2022
- Constituency: Lisbon

Member of the Lisbon City Council
- In office 28 October 2005 – 1 August 2007

Personal details
- Born: Rodrigo Miguel Dias Saraiva; 4 April 1976 (age 50) Lisbon, Portugal
- Party: IL (2018–present)
- Other political affiliations: PSD (until 2015); MPT (2015–2018)
- Spouse: Mónica Coelho
- Children: 3
- Education: University of Lisbon

Rodrigo Miguel Dias Saraiva (born 4 April 1976) is a Portuguese consultant and politician. Since 2022, he has served as a member of the Assembly of the Republic, leader of the parliamentary group and member of the executive committee of the Liberal Initiative.

Before the foundation of the Liberal Initiative, he was a member of the Social Democratic Party, having been Secretary General of the JSD and having been a Member of the Lisbon City Council during the mayorship of Carmona Rodrigues. He is a founding member of the Liberal Initiative and a member of the national leadership of the party.
