= Rui Rocha =

Portuguese politician (born 1970)

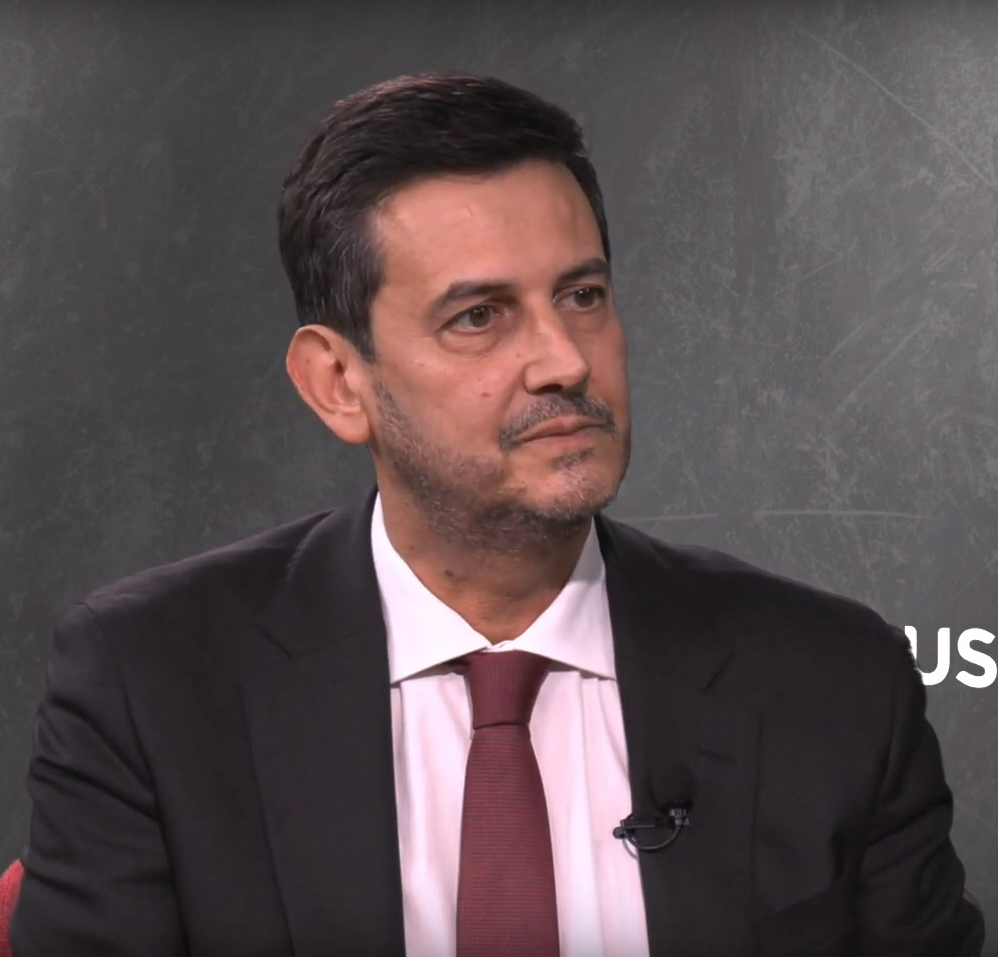
- Rocha in 2024

President of the Liberal Initiative
- In office 22 January 2023 – 31 May 2025
- Preceded by: João Cotrim de Figueiredo
- Succeeded by: Mariana Leitão

Member of the Assembly of the Republic
- Incumbent
- Assumed office 29 March 2022
- Constituency: Braga

Personal details
- Born: 13 March 1970 (age 56) Lobito, Portuguese Angola
- Party: Liberal Initiative (2020–present)
- Children: 2

Rui Nuno de Oliveira Garcia da Rocha (born 13 March 1970) is a Portuguese politician and member of the Assembly of the Republic who served as President of the Liberal Initiative from 2023 until 2025.

== Biography ==
Born in Lobito, Portuguese Angola, Rocha moved to Braga as a child. He is married and has two children. He graduated with a law degree from the Catholic University of Portugal in Porto and was a guest assistant on law courses at the Moderna University. He works as a lawyer, legal consultant and director of human resources, in the fields of construction, motoring, finance and specialised retail.

Rocha joined the Liberal Initiative in August 2020. He worked on Tiago Mayan Gonçalves's campaign in the 2021 Portuguese presidential election. In the 2022 Portuguese legislative election, he was the party's lead candidate in Braga and was elected.

Endorsed by outgoing leader João Cotrim de Figueiredo, Rocha was voted party leader on 22 January 2023. He received 51.7% of the votes from 2,300 party members. He set the target of reaching 15% of the votes in the following Portuguese legislative election and declared that he would only work with the Social Democratic Party if that party would not ally with Chega.

In the 2024 legislative election, called after António Costa's resignation as Prime Minister, the Liberal Initiative kept the 8 deputies it had before, and had only a slight increase in votes, failing the objective he had set after the election was called of electing at least 12 deputies. Rui Rocha showed himself available for negotiations with the Social Democratic Party, but the two parties ended up not forming any agreement to join the government or for any parliamentary support.

He resigned as president of the Liberal Initiative on 31 May 2025, following the results of the 2025 Portuguese legislative elections.

== Electoral history ==
=== IL leadership election, 2023 ===
Ballot: 22 January 2023
Candidate	Votes	%
Rui Rocha	888	51.7
Carla Castro	757	44.0
José Cardoso	74	4.3
Blank/Invalid ballots	9	–
Turnout	1,728	74.26
Source: IL Convention

=== Legislative election, 2024 ===
Ballot: 10 March 2024
Party	Candidate	Votes	%	Seats	+/−
AD	Luís Montenegro	1,867,442	28.8	80	+3
PS	Pedro Nuno Santos	1,812,443	28.0	78	–42
Chega	André Ventura	1,169,781	18.1	50	+38
IL	Rui Rocha	319,877	4.9	8	±0
BE	Mariana Mortágua	282,314	4.4	5	±0
CDU	Paulo Raimundo	205,551	3.2	4	–2
Livre	Rui Tavares	204,875	3.2	4	+3
PAN	Inês Sousa Real	126,125	2.0	1	±0
ADN	Bruno Fialho	102,134	1.6	0	±0
Other parties		104,167	1.6	0	±0
Blank/Invalid ballots		282,243	4.4	–	–
Turnout		6,476,952	59.90	230	±0
Source: Comissão Nacional de Eleições

=== IL leadership election, 2025 ===
Ballot: 2 February 2025
Candidate	Votes	%
Rui Rocha	73.4	
Rui Malheiro	26.6	
Blank/invalid ballots	–	
Turnout		

=== Legislative election, 2025 ===
Ballot: 18 May 2025
Party	Candidate	Votes	%	Seats	+/−
AD	Luís Montenegro	2,008,488	31.8	91	+11
PS	Pedro Nuno Santos	1,442,546	22.8	58	–20
Chega	André Ventura	1,438,554	22.8	60	+10
IL	Rui Rocha	338,974	5.4	9	+1
Livre	Rui Tavares	257,291	4.1	6	+2
CDU	Paulo Raimundo	183,686	2.9	3	–1
BE	Mariana Mortágua	125,808	2.0	1	–4
PAN	Inês Sousa Real	86,930	1.4	1	±0
ADN	Bruno Fialho	81,660	1.3	0	±0
Other parties		95,384	1.5	1	+1
Blank/Invalid ballots		260,648	4.1	–	–
Turnout		6,319,969	58.25	230	±0
Source: Comissão Nacional de Eleições

=== Braga City Council election, 2025 ===
Ballot: 12 October 2025
Party	Candidate	Votes	%	Seats	+/−
PSD/CDS–PP/PPM	João Rodrigues	26,378	24.5	3	–3
PS/PAN	António Braga	26,102	24.2	3	–1
Ind.	Ricardo Silva	21,551	20.0	3	new
IL	Rui Rocha	13,287	12.3	1	+1
Chega	Filipe Aguiar	11,205	10.4	1	+1
CDU	João Baptista	3,303	3.1	0	–1
LIVRE	Carlos Fragoso	1,732	1.6	0	±0
Other parties		1,435	1.3	0	±0
Blank/Invalid ballots		2,686	2.5	–	–
Turnout		107,679	64.04	11	±0
Source: Autárquicas 2025

== See also ==
- Liberalism in Portugal
