= Carlos Guimarães Pinto =

Portuguese economist, author, university professor (born 1983)

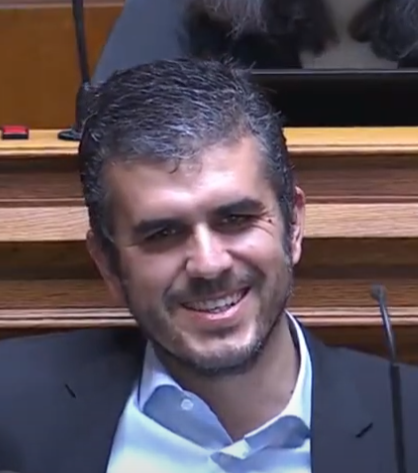
- Guimarães Pinto in 2022

President of the Liberal Initiative
- In office 13 October 2018 – 8 December 2019
- Preceded by: Miguel Ferreira da Silva
- Succeeded by: João Cotrim de Figueiredo

Member of the Assembly of the Republic
- Incumbent
- Assumed office 29 March 2022
- Constituency: Porto

Personal details
- Born: 21 August 1983 (age 43) Espinho, Portugal
- Party: Liberal Initiative
- Education: University of Porto

Carlos Manuel Guimarães Oliveira Pinto, better known as Carlos Guimarães Pinto (born in Espinho, Portugal, in 1983), is a Portuguese economist, author, university professor, think tank executive, blogger and politician. A prominent member of the Liberal Initiative, on October 13, 2018, he became the president of the party, a position he left on December 8, 2019 being succeeded by João Cotrim de Figueiredo. He is a founder of the think tank +Liberdade, a non-profit institute that promotes democracy, market economy and individual freedom in Portugal. In 2022, he was elected member of the Assembly of the Republic by the Porto electoral district.

== See also ==
- Liberalism in Portugal
