= XVII Constitutional Government of Portugal =

Cabinet of Portugal between 2005 and 2009, led by José Sócrates

- Cabinet of Portugal

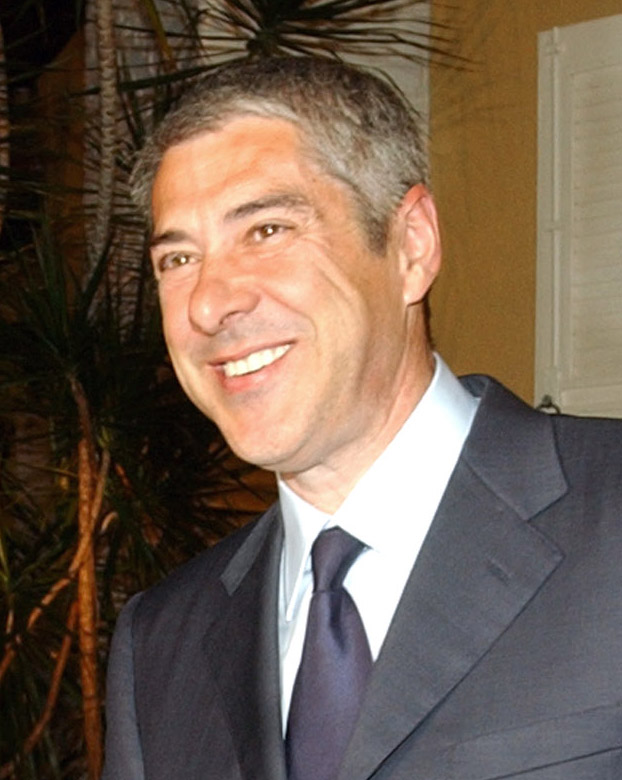
- Prime Minister José Sócrates
- Date formed: 12 March 2005
- Date dissolved: 26 October 2009

People and organisations
- President of the Republic: Jorge Sampaio; Anibal Cavaco Silva
- Prime Minister: José Sócrates
- Member parties: Socialist Party (PS)
- Status in legislature: Majority
- Opposition parties: Social Democratic Party (PSD); Portuguese Communist Party (PCP); CDS – People's Party (CDS–PP); Left Bloc (BE); Ecologist Party "The Greens" (PEV)

History
- Election: 2005 Portuguese legislative election (20 February 2005)
- Predecessor: XVI Constitutional Government of Portugal
- Successor: XVIII Constitutional Government of Portugal

The XVII Constitutional Government of Portugal (Portuguese: XVII Governo Constitucional de Portugal) was the 17th government of the Third Portuguese Republic, under the Portuguese Constitution of 1976. It was in office from 12 March 2005 to 26 October 2009, and was formed by the members of the Socialist Party (PS). José Sócrates, leader of the PS, served as Prime Minister.

== Party breakdown ==
Party breakdown of cabinet ministers by the end of the government's time in office: (Prime Minister not included)

- Socialist Party
- Independents
7
9

== Composition ==
The government was composed of the Prime Minister and 16 ministries comprising ministers, secretaries and under-secretaries of state.

Ministers of the XVII Constitutional Government of Portugal
Office	Minister	Party	Start of term	End of term
Prime Minister	José Sócrates	PS	12 March 2005	26 October 2009
Minister of State and Internal Administration	António Costa	PS	12 March 2005	17 May 2007
Minister of State and Foreign Affairs	Diogo Freitas do Amaral	Independent	12 March 2005	3 July 2006
Minister of State and Foreign Affairs	Luís Amado	PS	3 July 2006	26 October 2009
Minister of State and Finance	Luís Campos e Cunha	Independent	12 March 2005	21 July 2005
Minister of State and Finance	Fernando Teixeira dos Santos	Independent	21 July 2005	26 October 2009
Minister of Presidency	Pedro Silva Pereira	PS	12 March 2005	26 October 2009
Minister of National Defense	Luís Amado	PS	12 March 2005	3 July 2006
Minister of National Defense	Nuno Severiano Teixeira	Independent	3 July 2006	26 October 2009
Minister of Internal Administration	Rui Pereira	Independent	17 May 2007	26 October 2009
Minister of Justice	Alberto Costa	PS	12 March 2005	26 October 2009
Minister of the Environment, Territorial Planning and Regional Development	Francisco Nunes Correia	Independent	12 March 2005	26 October 2009
Minister of Economy and Innovation	Manuel Pinho	Independent	12 March 2005	6 July 2009
Minister of Economy and Innovation	Fernando Teixeira dos Santos (interim)	Independent	6 July 2009	26 October 2009
Minister of Agriculture, Rural Development and Fisheries	Jaime Silva	Independent	12 March 2005	26 October 2009
Minister of Public Works, Transportation and Communications	Mário Lino	PS	12 March 2005	26 October 2009
Minister of Labour and Social Solidarity	José António Vieira da Silva	PS	12 March 2005	26 October 2009
Minister of Health	António Correia de Campos	PS	12 March 2005	30 January 2008
Minister of Health	Ana Jorge	Independent	30 January 2008	26 October 2009
Minister of Education	Maria de Lurdes Rodrigues	Independent	12 March 2005	26 October 2009
Minister of Science, Technology and Higher Education	Mariano Gago	Independent	12 March 2005	26 October 2009
Minister of Culture	Isabel Pires de Lima	Independent	12 March 2005	30 January 2008
Minister of Culture	José Pinto Ribeiro	Independent	30 January 2008	26 October 2009
Minister of Parliamentary Affairs	Augusto Santos Silva	PS	12 March 2005	26 October 2009
