= Portugal–Serbia relations =

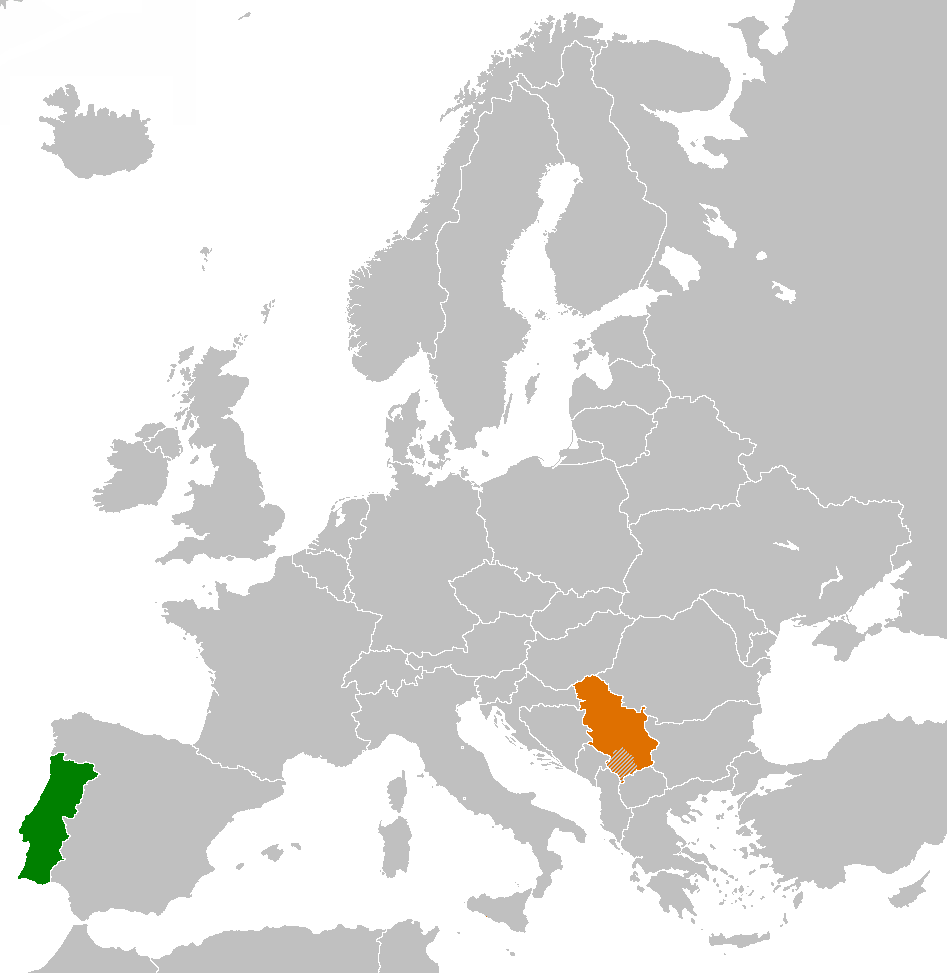
- Portugal: Serbia

Portugal and Serbia maintain diplomatic relations established in 1917. From 1918 to 2006, Portugal maintained relations with the Kingdom of Yugoslavia, the Socialist Federal Republic of Yugoslavia (SFRY), and the Federal Republic of Yugoslavia (FRY) (later Serbia and Montenegro), of which Serbia is considered shared (SFRY) or sole (FRY) legal successor.

== History ==
In 1999, Portugal participated in the NATO bombing of Yugoslavia from the Aviano Air Base in Italy. Portugal also provided troops as part of NATO peacekeeping efforts in the breakaway Serbian province of Kosovo in 1999. That same year Serbia filed a complaint with the International Court of Justice regarding Portugal's (and all the other member countries of NATO) use of force in the Federal Republic of Yugoslavia.

== High-level visits ==
- In December 1997, President of the Federal Republic of Yugoslavia Slobodan Milosević received Portuguese Foreign Minister Jaime Gama, to discuss strengthening bilateral relations.
- In January 2002 the Portuguese Foreign Minister, Jaime Gama, returned to the Federal Republic of Yugoslavia in his capacity as Organization for Security and Co-operation in Europe (OSCE) Chairman-in-Office. The OSCE was engaged in stabilizing the situation in southern Serbia following the Kosovo War.
- In November 2003, Serbia and Montenegro President Svetozar Marović visited Portugal. During this visit he signed an agreement on the succession of Bilateral Agreements between the SFR of Yugoslavia and Portugal, extending prior agreements on tourism, business, scientific and technological cooperation.
- In July 2005 Portuguese Minister of Defense Luís Amado visited Serbia and Montenegro, where he discussed military cooperation with his Serbo-Montenegrin counterpart.
- In May 2007 Portuguese Foreign Minister Luís Amado gave strong support for Serbian ambitions to join the European Union.
- In July 2007, Serbian Prime Minister Vojislav Koštunica visited Lisbon.
- In October 2008, Portugal recognized Kosovo's independence from Serbia.
- In November 2008, Portuguese Foreign Minister Luís Amado met with his Serbian counterpart Vuk Jeremić in Belgrade and voiced his support for removing the suspension of a trade agreement between Serbia and the European Union. Also that month, the Serbian Minister of Science and Technological Development met a Portuguese delegation and discussed cooperation in energy efficiency, nanotechnology and the food industry, with plans to sign a Cooperation Agreement on Science and Technology by the end of 2008.
- In February 2009, Serbian Defence Minister Dragan Šutanovac met with his Portuguese counterpart Nuno Severiano Teixeira. They signed an agreement on defense cooperation and discussed potential Serbia's NATO membership bid.
- In June 2009, Serbian Prime Minister Mirko Cvetković met with Portuguese parliamentary speaker Jaime Gama and discussed improvements to bilateral cooperation.

== Economic relations ==
Trade between two countries amounted to $157 million in 2023; Serbia's merchandise export to Portugal were about $46 million; Portuguese exports were standing at roughly $111 million.

== Resident diplomatic missions ==
- Portugal has an embassy in Belgrade.
- Serbia has an embassy in Lisbon.
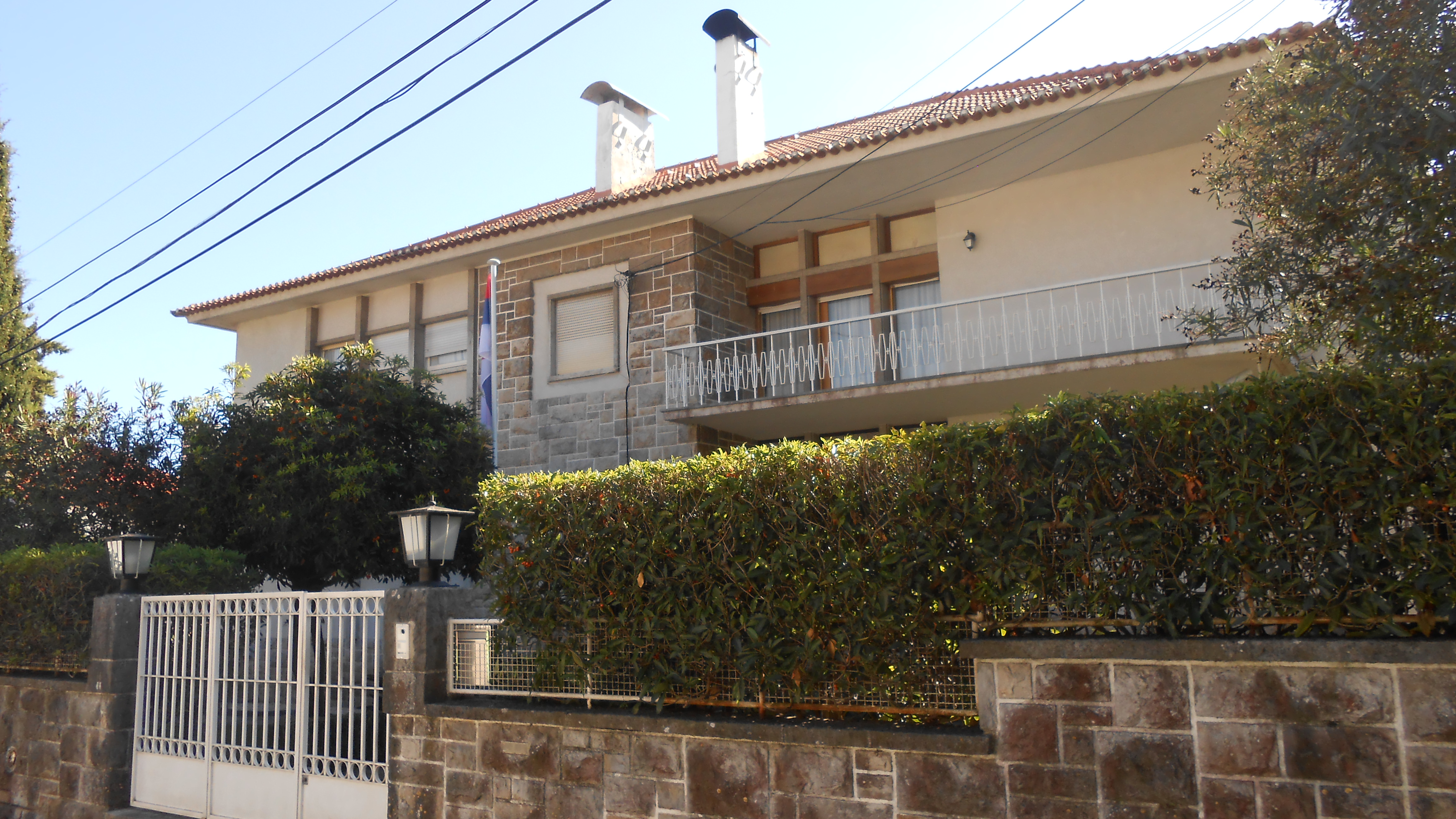
Embassy of Serbia in Lisbon

== See also ==
- Foreign relations of Portugal
- Foreign relations of Serbia
- Portugal–Yugoslavia relations
