= 2010 Madeira floods and mudslides =

2010 deadly natural disasters in Portugal

Coordinates: 32°41′52″N 16°46′28″W

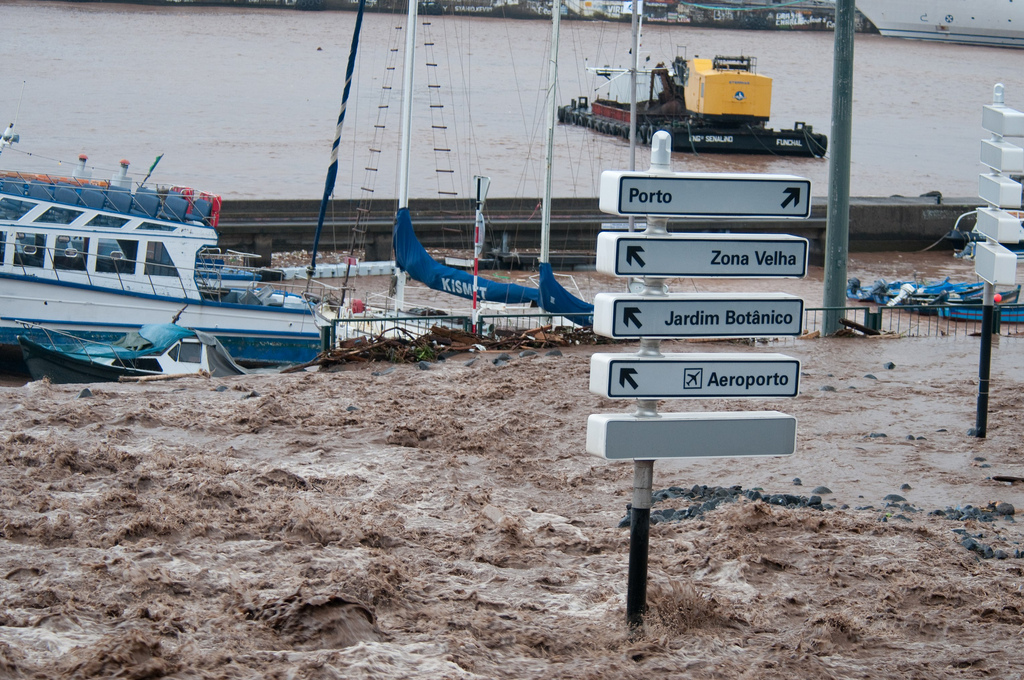

Meteorological history
- Duration: 20 February 2010

Overall effects
- Fatalities: 51
- Damage: >€1 billion (US$1×10^{9} in 2010)
- Areas affected: Madeira, Portugal

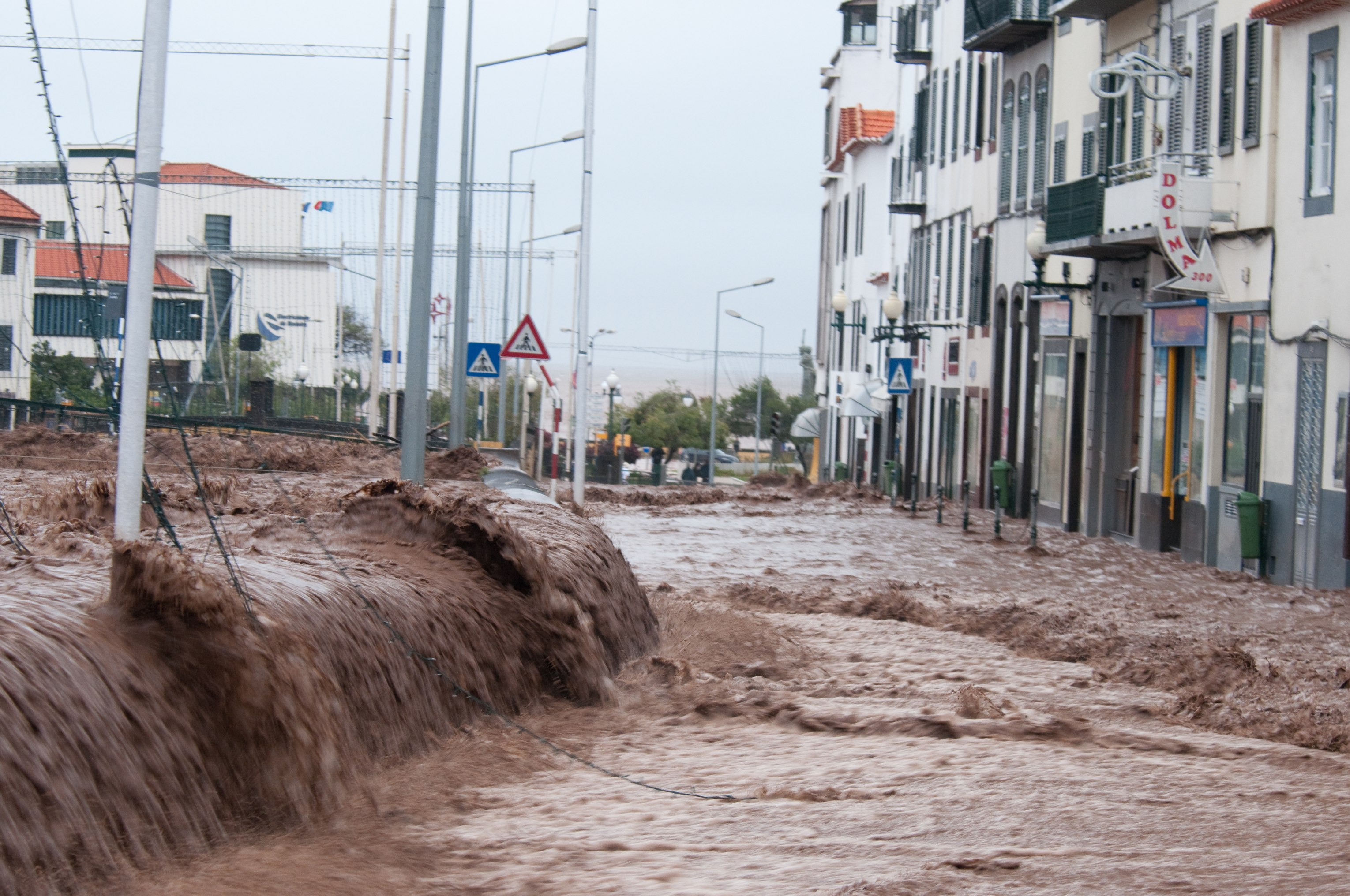
Flooding in Funchal

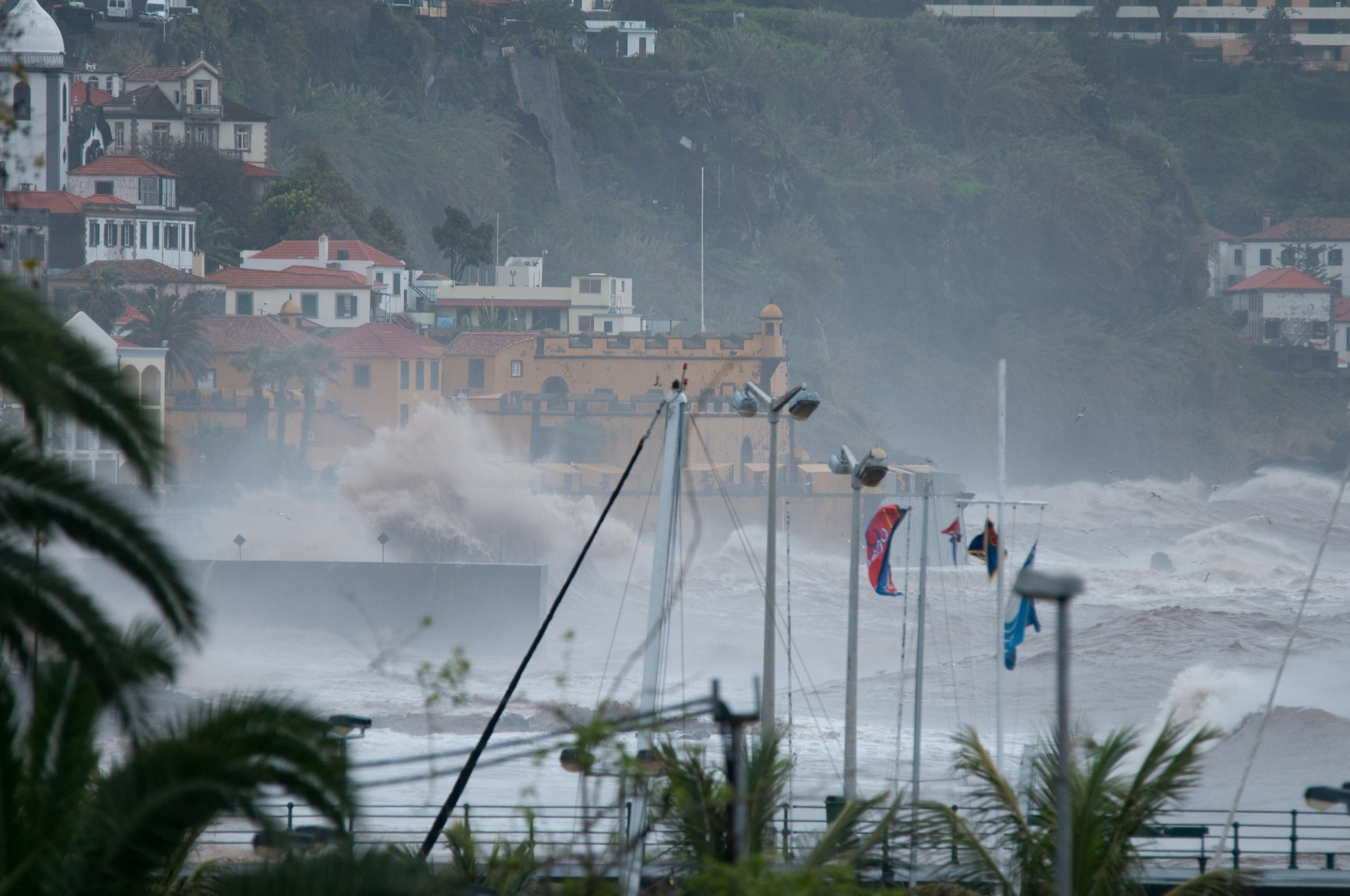
Waves during the flooding

An extreme weather event affected Madeira Island in Portugal's autonomous Madeira archipelago on 20 February 2010. The resulting flash floods and mudslides killed 51 people, of whom 6 are still to be found, and injured 250. Around 600 people were left homeless.

== Causes ==
The rainfall was associated with an active cold front and an Atlantic low-pressure area that was over the Azores and moved northeastwards on 19 February 2010.

This storm was one in a series of such storms that affected Spain, Portugal, Morocco and the Canary Islands with flooding, rain and high winds. These storms were bolstered by an unusually strong temperature contrast of the sea surface across the Atlantic Ocean. Abnormally warm waters had been widespread off West Africa whereas relatively cold surface waters had stretched between western Europe and the southeastern United States.

The storm was exacerbated by the eruption cloud of the Soufrière Hills volcano.

The floods and mudslides were the result of an extreme weather event that, in some places, dropped more than double the monthly average of rainfall in a very short period. Between 6 a.m. and 11 a.m. local time (and UTC), 108 mm (4¼ inches) of rain was recorded at Funchal weather station and 165 mm (6½ inches) of rain at the weather station on Pico do Arieiro. The average rainfall in Funchal for the whole of February is 88.0 mm (3½ inches).

== Effects ==
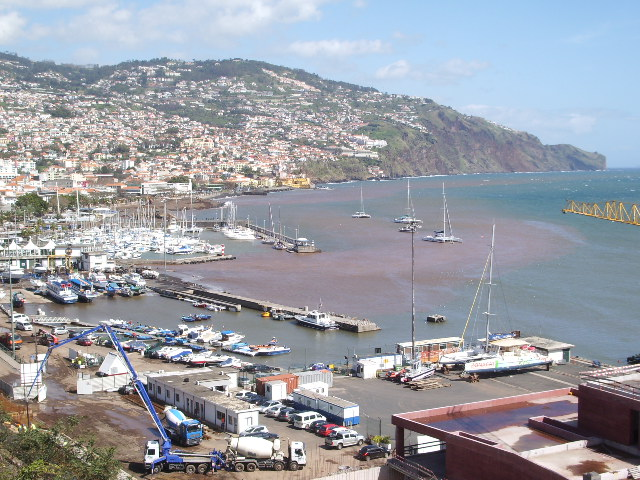
Mud washing out to sea following the flooding

Damage was confined to the south of the island.

The city of Funchal was heavily damaged by landslides. In one instance, mud and water gushed down a city street over cars and buildings. Communications were seriously disrupted across the island.

Amid the destruction, the airport was closed, bridges were washed away, and one man saw his family swept off by the waters. One hotel manager commented, "This was worse than the last really big storm in 1993. We have been told that three inches of rain fell in an hour. I saw a new BMW floating past the end of my street today."

As of 2020, five families still do not have a permanent home.

== Emergency response ==
Portuguese Prime Minister José Sócrates said he was "absolutely saddened and shocked with the images, with the consequences of this calamity." He promised the government would provide help to ensure Madeira could begin recovery work as quickly as possible. Sócrates and Interior Minister Rui Pereira planned a flight to the island to examine and evaluate the damages and to coordinate aid efforts with the local autonomous government of Alberto João Jardim. Local government authorities made temporary shelters available for the homeless, estimated in the hundreds. The Portuguese military sent a naval frigate, containing medical equipment and a helicopter, to Madeira. However, the Portuguese government declined to declare a state of emergency in the region, which would have made them eligible to obtain funds from the European Union, saying, “We don’t need anything from Brussels. We know exactly what we will do. We don’t need any help; we will solve our problems.”

The UK Foreign and Commonwealth Office reported that five Britons sustained injuries, and one is missing. As of 26 February, Portuguese official sources reported 42 dead and 8 missing, of whom only one was a tourist.

Reconstruction and cleaning work started a few hours after the rainfall. On the same day, several dozen units of heavy machinery and trucks were seen in the streets of Funchal and other major affected sites, cleaning streets as well as rocks and mud accumulated in the "ribeiras". In the next few days this number peaked to several hundred heavy units and trucks operating in all affected sites. In spite of some access restrictions in the centre of Funchal and some other parts of the island, all services were soon fully functional and normal life was restored. No tourist resorts were affected by the event, except for a few small hotels inland where some blocked roads caused access restrictions. While full restoration of all affected infrastructure may take up to a few years and cost around €1.4 billion, most of the island is fully functional.

== Humanitarian response ==
In support of the flood victims, Real Madrid footballer and noted Madeiran Cristiano Ronaldo pledged to play in a charity match in Madeira, between the Portuguese Liga club Porto and players from Madeiran-based Portuguese Liga clubs C.S. Marítimo and Nacional.

On 7 March 2010, the Mota-Engil group announced that it would make an investment of €1.2 million to build 10 houses for those who were made homeless as a result of the floods.
