= RTP Música =

Proposed Portuguese television channel

RTP Música was a planned RTP channel that was supposed to broadcast music videos of Portuguese and Lusophone musicians. Initially hinted for a 7 March 2011 launch, it was later developed before the project was ultimately cancelled.

== History ==
On 11 January 2011, RTP announced the launch of RTP Música for 7 March 2011, its 54th anniversary. Details of the project were being revealed, with a strong emphasis on the broad scope of Lusophone music and artists. There would be no specific programs, but there would be also be content sourced from RTP's archives and priority to new artists. Its team was still being built, but the channel's faces were set to be new. The corporation invested €1,3 million in the project and, in principle, depending on negotiations, it would be available on all subscription television operators. 70% of its programming was set to be original, and also had plans to broadcast abroad. That day, the channel held a presentation event at Palácio Foz in Lisbon

The initial 7 March target failed due to problems with its self-financing, as well as its dependence on an internal reorganization of the corporation. Later in the year, the fall of the Portuguese government and the ousting of José Socrates led to a new restructuring phase at the corporation, which would also imply the dismissing of employees and budget cuts. This led to the cancellation of the project.

Even after the project was shelved, Jaime Fernandes (who died in 2016) was still its director as late as 2013; after his death, the 2017 RTP license contract nullified the creation of RTP Música and three further channels, a children's channel, a civil society channel and a knowledge channel.

There were programs produced with the music channel in mind, such as the 2012 documentary Meu Caro Amigo Chico about Chico Buarque, whose release, due to the lack of the RTP Música channel, was reserved only for film festivals and as of 2021 was yet to be broadcast on RTP.
