= List of programs broadcast by Disney Channel (Portugal) =

This is a list of television programs currently broadcast (in first-run or reruns), scheduled to be broadcast or formerly broadcast on Disney Channel Portugal.

== Programming ==
=== Current programming ===
==== Original programming ====
===== Live-action =====
- Bunk'd (March 18, 2016 – present) (Note: Currently on hiatus and not airing reruns.)
- Raven's Home (February 16, 2018 – present)
- Sydney to the Max (January 4, 2021 – present) (Note: Currently on hiatus and not airing reruns.)
- Secrets of Sulphur Springs (May 1, 2021 – present) (Note: Currently on hiatus and not airing reruns.)
- The Villains of Valley View (March 13, 2023 – present)

===== Animated =====
- Mickey Mouse (September 13, 2013 – present)
- Big City Greens (July 1, 2019 – present)
- Moon Girl and Devil Dinosaur (March 10, 2023 – present) (Note: Currently on hiatus and not airing reruns.)
- Hamster & Gretel (April 1, 2023 – present)
- Kiff (May 15, 2023 – present)
- Hailey's On It! (February 19, 2024 – present)

==== Reruns ====
===== Animated =====
- Gravity Falls (June 7, 2013 – June 1, 2016, first run; June 2, 2016 – present, reruns)
- Amphibia (September 14, 2020 – November 22, 2022, first-run; November 23, 2022 – present, reruns)
- The Owl House (January 11, 2021 – June 24, 2023, first-run; June 25, 2023 – present, reruns)
- The Ghost and Molly McGee (February 21, 2022 – February 9, 2024, first-run; February 10, 2024 – present, reruns)

==== Acquired programming ====
===== Other programming =====
- Miraculous: Tales of Ladybug & Cat Noir (February 22, 2016 – present)

=== Former programming ===
==== Original programming ====
===== Animated series =====
- Kim Possible (September 15, 2003 – June 20, 2008, first-run; June 21, 2008 – 2011, April 29, 2013 – 2014, reruns)
- The Proud Family (September 20, 2003 – 2008, first-run; 2010 – 2011, reruns)
- Lilo & Stitch: The Series (January 5, 2004 – 2007, first-run; 2007 – 2009, 2011 – 2014, reruns)
- Dave the Barbarian (2004 – 2005, first-run; 2005 – 2009, Summer 2015 reruns)
- Brandy and Mr. Whiskers (March 19, 2005 – 2007, first-run; 2007 – 2011, 2012, 2015 reruns)
- The Buzz on Maggie (2005 – 2006)
- American Dragon: Jake Long (April 18, 2005 – 2009, first-run; 2009 – 2011, reruns)
- The Emperor's New School (June, 2006 – 2009, first-run; 2009 – 2014, reruns)
- The Replacements (February 23, 2007 – 2009, first-run; 2009 – 2012, June 17, 2013 – 2014, reruns)
- Phineas and Ferb (February 1, 2008 – September 12, 2015, first run; September 13, 2015 – 2016, 2018 reruns)
- Fish Hooks (February 25, 2011 – 2012)
- Elena of Avalor (October 8, 2016 – unknown)
- Milo Murphy's Law (April 17, 2017 – April 9, 2020)
- Tangled: The Series (June 3, 2017 – January 28, 2021)
- DuckTales (November 11, 2017 – July 19, 2022)
- Big Hero 6: The Series (October 12, 2018 – December 30, 2021)
- 101 Dalmatian Street (March 23, 2019 – 2022)

===== Sitcoms/comedy-drama series =====
- Even Stevens (April, 2004 – 2007, first-run)
- Lizzie McGuire (April, 2004 – 2007, first-run; 2007 – 2009, reruns)
- That's So Raven (April, 2004 – 2008, first-run; 2008 – 2010, reruns)
- Phil of the Future (June 2005 – 2007, first-run; 2007 – 2009, reruns)
- The Suite Life of Zack & Cody (September, 2005 – 2008, first-run; 2008 – 2010, reruns)
- Hannah Montana (September 15, 2006 – 2011, first-run, 2011 – September 30, 2013, Summer 2015, reruns)
- Cory in the House (March, 2007 – 2009, first-run; 2009 – 2010, reruns)
- Wizards of Waverly Place (January 18, 2008 – March 23, 2012, first run; March 24, 2012 – September 15, 2013, Summer 2015, reruns)
- The Suite Life on Deck (January 16, 2009 – November 25, 2011, first-run; 2011 – September 15, 2013; Summer 2014; Summer 2015, reruns)
- Sonny with a Chance (June 27, 2009 – 2011)
- Jonas L.A. (September 13, 2009 – 2010)
- Good Luck Charlie (October 8, 2010 – June 6, 2014, first run; June 6, 2014 – September 2015, reruns)
- Shake It Up (April 8, 2011 – April 11, 2014, first-run; April 11, 2014 – September 2015, reruns)
- So Random! (September 30, 2011 – 2012)
- A.N.T. Farm (November 25, 2011 – Abril 18, 2014, first-run; April 19, 2014 – September 2015, reruns)
- Jessie (February 10, 2012 – March 18, 2016, first-run; March 19, 2016 – September 2016, reruns)
- Austin & Ally (May 11, 2012 – February 12, 2016, first-run; February 13, 2016 – June 2016, reruns)
- Dog with a Blog (March 22, 2013 – March 25, 2016, first-run; March 26, 2016 – June 2016, reruns)
- Violetta (September 16, 2013 – January 6, 2016, first-run)
- Liv and Maddie (January 31, 2014 – Novembro 24, 2017, first-run)
- I Didn't Do It (May 16, 2014 – July 15, 2016, first-run)
- Girl Meets World (January 24, 2015 – December 16, 2016, first-run) (Note: Only the first two seasons have aired on the channel.)
- K.C. Undercover (May 23, 2015 – July 20, 2018, first-run)
- Best Friends Whenever (January 11, 2016 – June 23, 2017, first-run)
- Soy Luna (April 4, 2016 – December 21, 2018, first-run)
- Stuck in the Middle (June 10, 2016 – November 22, 2018, first-run; November 23, 2018 – 2022, reruns)
- Bizaardvark (September 18, 2017 – November 5, 2019, first-run)
- Andi Mack (April 9, 2018 – May 14, 2018, first-run) (Note: Only the first season has aired on the channel.)
- Fast Layne (May 17, 2019 – June 21, 2019, first-run)
- Coop & Cami Ask the World (May 27, 2019 – 2022)
- Gabby Duran & the Unsittables (March 9, 2020 – 2022)

===== Educational series =====
- Art Attack (2002 – 2014)

===== Drama series =====
- So Weird (2002 – 2003)

===== Reality series =====
- PrankStars (December 16, 2011 – December 28, 2012)

===== Mini-series and specials =====
- Disney Channel Games (2006 – 2008)
- Studio DC: Almost Live (three-part special; 2008)
- Disney's Friends for Change Games (June 2011)

===== Short series =====
- Minuscule (2007 – 2010)
- As the Bell Rings (2007 – 2010)
- Brian O'Brian (September 20, 2008 – 2009)
- Future-Worm! (July 3, 2015 – September, 2015)
- Descendants: Wicked World (October 10, 2015 – April 1, 2017, first run; April 2, 2017 – present, reruns)

==== Disney XD series ====
===== Live-action series =====
- Aaron Stone (2009 – 2011)
- Zeke and Luther (2009 – 2012, first run; Summer 2015, reruns)
- I'm in the Band (October 10, 2010 – 2013, first run; September 21, 2015 – 2016, reruns)
- Pair of Kings (May 13, 2011 – April 19, 2014, first run; Summer 2015, reruns)
- Lab Rats (June 16, 2012 – January 13, 2023) (Note: The show has had an unusual run on the channel. The first season aired from June 16, 2012 to January 5, 2013. The second season only premiered on June 27, 2014 and aired the season finale on July 10, 2015. The channel went on to just air reruns of those two seasons on the channel until June 1, 2020 when seasons 3 and 4 premiered.)
- Kickin' It (September 22, 2012 – August 29, 2014, first-run) (Note: Only the first two seasons aired on the channel.)
- Crash & Bernstein (January 17, 2014 – April 24, 2015, first-run) (Note: Only the first season aired on the channel.)
- Gamer's Guide to Pretty Much Everything (February 29, 2016 – July 29, 2017)

===== Animated series =====
- Randy Cunningham: 9th Grade Ninja (July 5, 2014 – January 30, 2016, first run; January 31, 2016 – 2018, reruns)
- Star Wars Rebels (October 25, 2014 – February 11, 2017, first-run) (Note: Only the first three seasons have aired on the channel. Moved to SIC K)
- Wander Over Yonder (January 3, 2015 – March 21, 2017, first-run)
- The 7D (April 6, 2015 – July 21, 2017, first-run)
- Star vs. the Forces of Evil (December 19, 2015 – January 10, 2020, first-run)

==== Acquired programming ====
===== Animated series =====
- Mickey Mouseworks (2001 – 2002)
- Jungle Cubs (2001 – 2002)
- Mighty Ducks (2001 – 2002)
- Doug (2001 – 2002)
- Gargoyles (2001 – 2004)
- The New Adventures of Winnie the Pooh (2001 – 2005, reruns)
- 101 Dalmatians: The Series (2001 – 2004, first-run; 2005, 2006 – 2007, 2015 reruns)
- Pepper Ann (2001 – 2006, first-run; 2011, rerun)
- Timon & Pumbaa (2001 – 2007, first-run; November 2, 2013 – 2014, reruns)
- Hercules (2001 – 2008, first run; 2014 – 2015; reruns)
- Recess (2001 – 2008, first-run; 2012 – October 31, 2012, reruns)
- Goof Troop (2001 – 2007)
- Quack Pack (2001 – 2004, first-run; 2013 – 2015, reruns)
- Buzz Lightyear of Star Command (2001 – 2004, reruns)
- House of Mouse (2002 – 2010)
- Teacher's Pet (2002 – 2003, first-run; 2006 – 2007, reruns)
- DuckTales (2002 – 2005, first-run; 2011 – 2012, reruns)
- The Weekenders (2002 – 2004, first-run; 2007 – 2008, reruns)
- Stanley (2002 – 2005)
- The Legend of Tarzan (2002 – 2006)
- Aladdin (2002 – 2008, first run; September 21, 2015 – 2016, reruns)
- Sabrina: The Animated Series (2002 – 2007)
- Lloyd in Space (2003 – 2005, first-run; 2007 – 2008, reruns)
- Bear in the Big Blue House (2003 – 2006) (English language only)
- The Book of Pooh (2004 – 2006)
- Teamo Supremo (2004 – 2006, first-run; 2009, reruns)
- Fillmore! (June 2004 – 2006)
- The Little Mermaid (2004 – 2006)
- Dogtanian and the Three Muskehounds (2004 – 2006; 2009)
- Sabrina's Secret Life (September, 2004 – 2007)
- The Triplets (2005 – 2007)
- JoJo's Circus (2006 – 2009)
- Higglytown Heroes (2006 – 2009)
- Shanna's Show (2007 – 2009)
- Lou and Lou: Safety Patrol (2007 – 2009)
- My Friends Tigger & Pooh (September 21, 2007 – 2011)
- Shaun the Sheep (2007 – 2009)
- Famous 5: On the Case (June 28, 2008 – 2014)
- Around the World with Willy Fog (2008 – 2009)
- Pocket Dragon Adventures (2009)
- Casper's Scare School (2009 – 2016)
- W.I.T.C.H. (2010 – 2016)
- Stitch! (2010 – 2012)
- Marco e Monkey (2010)
- Totally Spies! (2010 – 2012)
- The Jungle Book (2011 – 2014)
- Kid vs. Kat (2011 – 2012, first run; Summer 2014, reruns)
- Atomic Betty (2011 – 2014)
- Rekkit Rabbit (July 21, 2012 – 2018)
- Monster High (February 11, 2013 – 2014)
- Littlest Pet Shop (June 1, 2013 – 2016)
- Sandra the Fairytale Detective (September 21, 2013 – 2017)
- Sabrina: Secrets of a Teenage Witch (September 15, 2014 – 2017)
- Boyster (September 19, 2015 – 2018)
- Tsum Tsum (2015 – 2017)
- Hotel Transylvania: The Series (October 7, 2017 – 2020)
- Sadie Sparks (February 3, 2020 – 2024)
- Ghostforce (September, 2021 – 2023)
- The Unstoppable Yellow Yeti (May 9, 2022 – 2024)

===== Live-action series =====
- Honey, I Shrunk the Kids: The TV Show (2001 – 2004) (English language only)
- Home Improvement (2001 – 2004) (English language only)
- Dinosaurs (2001 – 2003) (English language only)
- Brotherly Love (2001 – 2002) (English language only)
- Boy Meets World (2002 – 2003) (English language only)
- Teen Angel (2002 – 2003) (English language only)
- Are You Afraid of the Dark? (2002 – 2004) (English language only)
- Smart Guy (2002 – 2004) (English language only)
- Lois & Clark: The New Adventures of Superman (2003) (English language only)
- O Clube das Chaves (October 2005 – 2008)
- Uma Aventura (2006 – 2009)
- Life with Derek (August 7, 2007 – 2010)
- Floribella (September 10, 2007 – 2009)
- Jonas Brothers: Living the Dream (2008 – 2010) (English language only)
- Pirate Islands (2009 – 2010) (English language only)
- The Saddle Club (2009 – 2012) (English language only)
- The Sleepover Club (2009 – 2011) (English language only)
- Dance Academy (2011)
- H_{2}O: Just Add Water (2011 – 2014; Summer 2015, reruns)
- My Babysitter's a Vampire (October 19, 2011 – 2012; October 2013; October 2014; October 2015, reruns)
- Mr. Young (January 7, 2013 – 2014)
- The Next Step (April 13, 2015 – 2016)
- Backstage (June 20, 2016 – 2016)
- Club Houdini (April 28, 2018 – June 16, 2022)
- Bia (October 7, 2019 – unknown)

== Programming blocks ==
=== Current ===
- Disneyespertador (2006; 2013 – present)
- We Love Sextas (2010 – present; every Friday from 6 PM; premieres, new episodes and/or specials)
- 13 Dias de Halloween (Halloween block; October, 2011 – present)
- Tu Escolhes (monthly special; April 13, 2015 – present)
- Top 5 (top 5 episodes of the week; September 20, 2015 – present)

=== Former ===
- Playhouse Disney (2001 – 2011)
- ControlTV (2001 – 2002)
- Hora dos Heróis (2001 – 2002)
- Kabunga! (2001 – 2002)
- Maratoon (2006 – 2009)
- Tele Pequeno-Almoço (2008)
- Disney Junior (2011 – June 2013)
- Top 10 (top 10 episodes of the week; September 22, 2013 – June 7, 2015)

==== Former holiday blocks ====
- Até que Enfim Halloween (Halloween 2006)
- Verão de Estrelas (Summer 2009)
- Feitiçoutubro (Halloween 2009 – 2010)
- Natal de Estrelas (Christmas 2009)
- It's On! (Summer 2010)
- Um Natal com Surpresas (December 1, 2010 – December 31, 2012)
- Sou Fã! (Summer 2012)
- Um Verão de... (Summer 2013)
- A Festa de Natal (Christmas 2013)
- O Presentão de Natal (December 1, 2014 – December 25, 2014)

== See also ==
- List of Disney Channel original movies
- List of Disney Channel original series
