= Uma Aventura na Casa Assombrada =

2009 Portuguese film by Carlos Coelho da Silva

- Directed by: Carlos Coelho da Silva
- Based on: Uma Aventura na Casa Assombrada by Ana Maria Magalhães and Isabel Alçada
- Starring: Sara Salgado; Francisco Areosa; Margarida Martinho; Mariana Martinho; César Brito
- Release date: December 3, 2009 (Portugal)
- Running time: 100 minutes
- Country: Portugal
- Language: Portuguese

Uma Aventura na Casa Assombrada is a 2009 Portuguese film directed by Carlos Coelho da Silva.

== Cast ==
- Sara Salgado
- Thales Egidio
- Francisco Areosa
- Margarida Martinho
- Mariana Martinho
- César Brito
