= Armando Vara =

Portuguese politician and banking administrator

Armando António Martins Vara (born 27 March 1954, Vinhais) is a Portuguese politician and banking administrator.

He enrolled in philosophy, at the New University of Lisbon, leaving the institution without being awarded a degree. Throughout his life he was an employee at the state-owned bank Caixa Geral de Depósitos where he worked in several different positions ranging from clerk (it was his first job) to administrator (appointed in 2005, three days after had been awarded a degree in international relations by the Independente University), and was member of parliament to the Portuguese Assembleia da República for several years.

In addition, Vara is a former Secretary of State, Minister of Home Affairs, and Minister of Youth and Sports in the Portuguese Government, always by the Socialists.

In January 2008, he was appointed vice-chairman of Millennium bcp bank. In October 2009 it was reported that Vara is an arguido (formal suspect) in the Face Oculta scandal.

Armando Vara was sentenced to five years imprisonment on 5 September 2014. He was again placed in custody on 9 July 2015, as part of the "Operação Marquês" operation, aimed at former Prime Minister José Sócrates. His detention followed the searches conducted at his home, in various companies, and a bank. José Sócrates was suspected of having favored a tourism business through a government plan, Vara at the time was director of the General Deposits, entity that financed that enterprise.
