= Vilar de Maçada =

- Civil parish
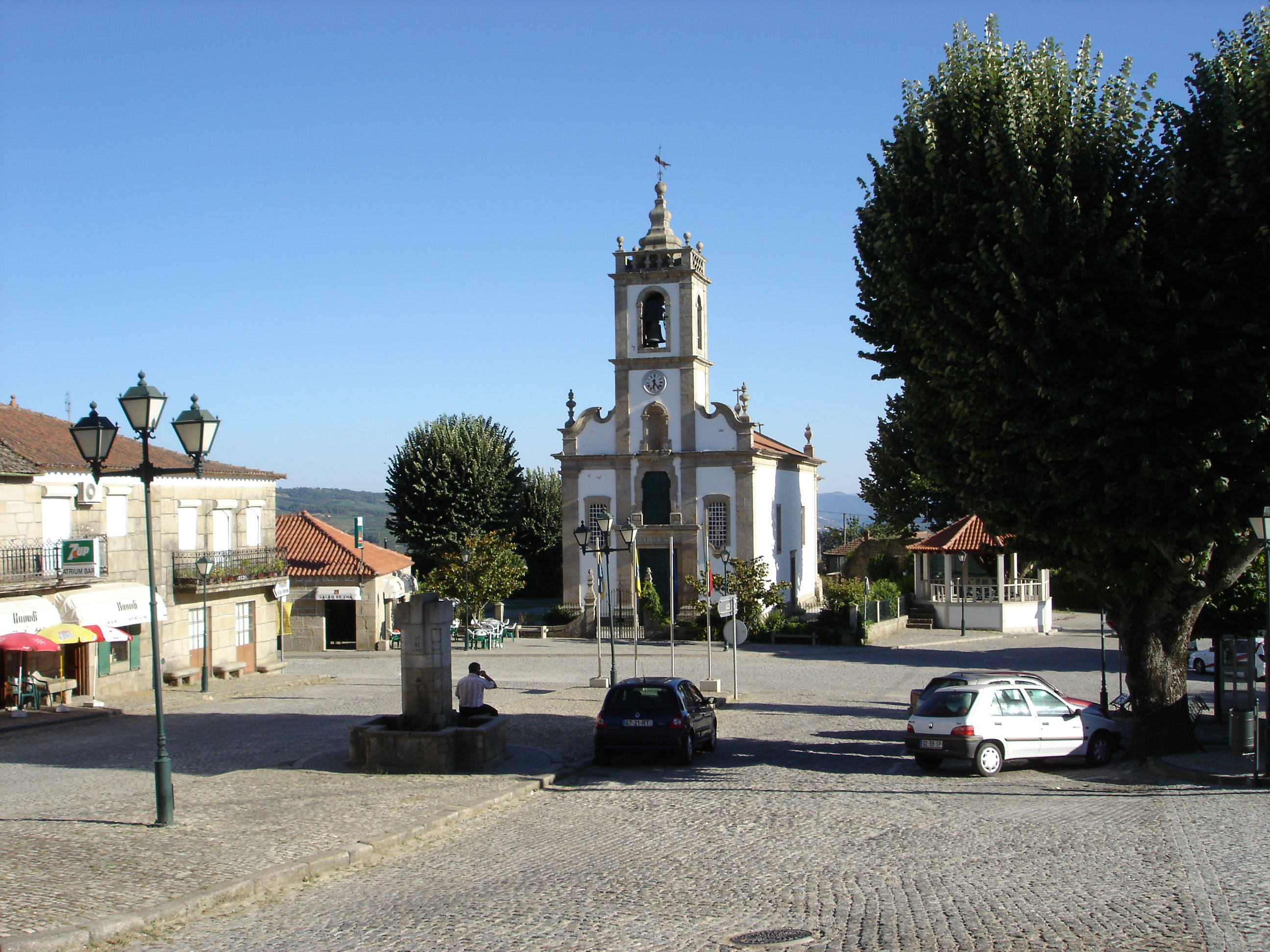

- Location in Portugal
- Coordinates: 41.326°N 7.559°W
- Country: Portugal
- Region: Norte
- Intermunic. comm.: Douro
- District: Vila Real
- Municipality: Alijó

Area
  - Total: 20.19 km^{2} (7.80 sq mi)

Population (2011)
  - Total: 915
  - Density: 45.3/km^{2} (117/sq mi)
- Time zone: UTC+00:00 (WET)
  - Summer (DST): UTC+01:00 (WEST)

Vilar de Maçada is a freguesia (civil parish) of Alijó municipality, in northern Portugal. In 2011, the population was 915, in an area of 20.19 km^{2}. In 2021, the population was 816.

The locality is known as the birth place of José Sócrates, former Portuguese Prime-Minister born in the city of Porto in 1957.
