= Portugal–Yugoslavia relations =

Portugal–Kingdom of Yugoslavia relations
- Portugal: Yugoslavia

Portugal–Yugoslavia relations
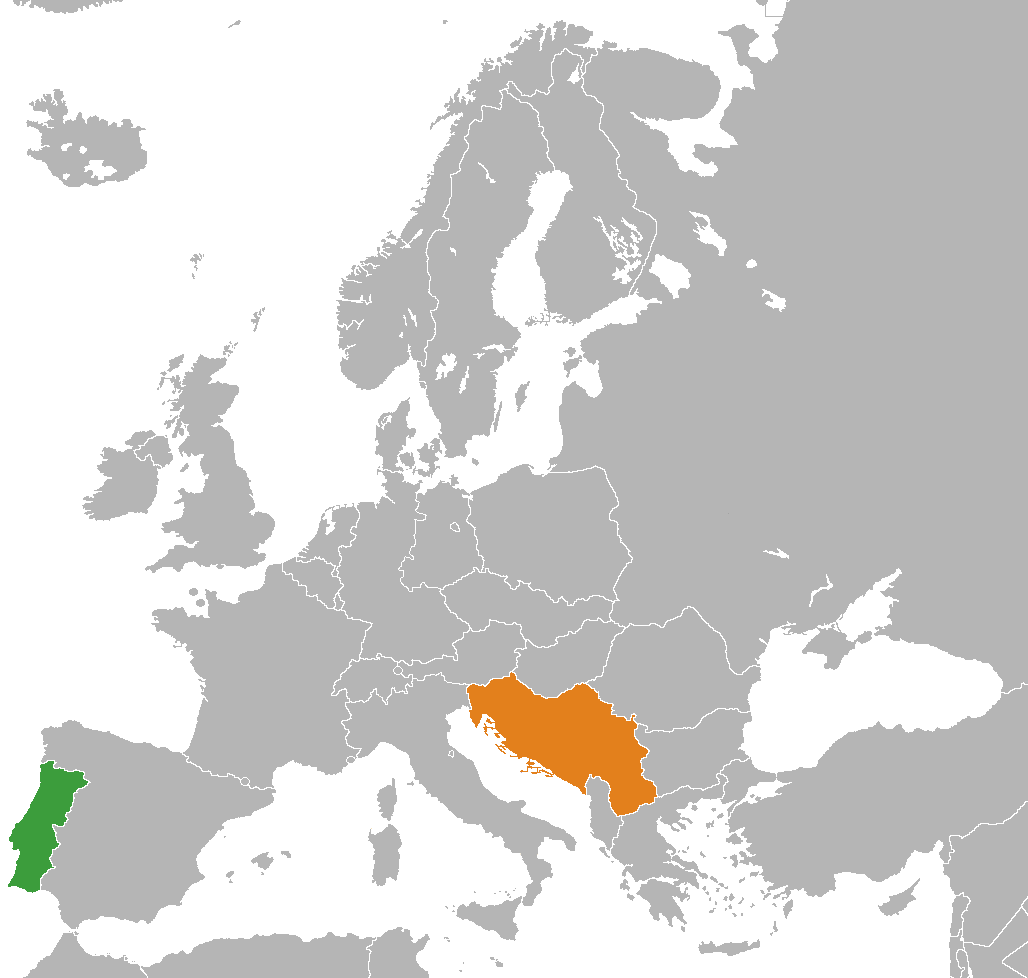

- Portugal: Yugoslavia

Portugal–Yugoslavia relations (Portuguese: Relações Portugal–Jugoslávia; Serbo-Croatian: Portugalsko-jugoslavenski odnosi, Подругалско-југословенски односи; Slovene: Odnosi med Portugalsko in Jugoslavijo; Macedonian: Односите Португалија-Југославија) were historical foreign relations between Portugal and the former Yugoslavia (Kingdom of Yugoslavia 1918-1941 and Socialist Federal Republic of Yugoslavia 1945–1992). Portugal established diplomatic relations with the Kingdom of Serbia on 19 October 1917. with relations continuing with the successor Kingdom of Yugoslavia. The Portuguese recognized the government in exile of this state after the German occupation of 1941. The first Portuguese ambassador to Yugoslavia was Fernando Quartin de Oliveira Bastos who arrived in Belgrade in February 1941 with official residence in Bucharest. Relations with the Socialist Federal Republic of Yugoslavia, which took power in 1945 after World War II, were suspended in 1948, and only reestablished in 1974 after the Portuguese Carnation Revolution. This was because of Portuguese dictator António de Oliveira Salazar's strict anti-communism. Relations further soured during the Portuguese Colonial War as Yugoslavia provided military and other forms of aid to MPLA and other liberation movements fighting against Portugal. The first permanent Portuguese embassy was opened in Belgrade in July 1977 with Alvaro Manuel Soares Guerra as ambassador.

== Country comparison ==
Common name	Portugal	Yugoslavia
Official name	Portuguese Republic	Socialist Federal Republic of Yugoslavia
Coat of arms		
Flag		
Capital	Lisbon	Belgrade
Largest city	Lisbon	Belgrade
Population	10,970,155	23,229,846
Government	Unitary Semi-Presidential Republic	Federal Socialist republic
Official languages	Portuguese	No official language Serbo-Croatian (de facto state-wide) Slovene (in Slovenia) and Macedonian (in Macedonia)
First leader	Sidonio Pais	Joseph Broz Tito
Last leader	Mario Soares	Milan Pančevski
Religion	Catholic Catholicism (de facto), secular state (de jure)	Secular state (de jure), state atheism (de facto)
Alliances	EEC, NATO	Non-Aligned Movement

== See also ==
- Yugoslavia and the Non-Aligned Movement
- Death and state funeral of Josip Broz Tito
- Serbia in the Eurovision Song Contest 2018
- Portugal in the Eurovision Song Contest 1990
- Foreign relations of Portugal
- Foreign relations of Yugoslavia
- Yugoslavia–European Communities relations
- Croatia–Portugal relations
- Portugal–Serbia relations
