= Uma Aventura =

- Genre: Adventure; Mystery; Action; Comedy
- Developed by: SIC
- Starring: Cristóvão Campos (season 1); Manuel Moreira (season 1); Mafalda Mendes (season 1-2); Filipa Mendes (season 1-2); Sandro Silva (season 1); Alexandre Personne (season 2); João Albino (season 2); Salvador Nery (season 2); Francisco Areosa (season 3-4); Rudy Rocha (season 3-4); Maria Figueiredo (season 3-4); Diana Figueiredo (season 3-4); Pedro Nolasco (season 3-4)
- Country of origin: Portugal
- Original language: Portuguese
- No. of seasons: 4
- No. of episodes: 47

Production
- Production locations: Lisbon, Setubal, Porto
- Running time: 52 minutes

Original release
- Network: SIC
- Release: October 14, 2000 – April 19, 2007

Related
- Morangos com Açúcar

Uma Aventura is a Portuguese television series based on the children's literature series of the same name. It first aired on SIC on October 14, 2000.

== Cast ==
=== First Season (2000) ===
- Cristóvão Campos - Chico
- Manuel Moreira - Pedro
- Mafalda Mendes - Teresa
- Filipa Mendes - Luísa
- Sandro Silva - João

=== Second Season (2001) ===
- Alexandre Personne - Chico
- João Albino - Pedro
- Salvador Nery - João
- Mafalda Mendes - Teresa
- Filipa Mendes - Luísa

=== Third and Fourth Seasons (2003-2006) ===
- Francisco Areosa - Chico
- Rudy Rocha - João
- Diana Figueiredo - Teresa
- Maria Figueiredo - Luísa
- Pedro Nolasco - Pedro

== Episodes ==
Season	Episodes	Debut	Ending
1	7	October 14, 2000	November 25, 2000
2	9	October 13, 2001	December 8, 2001
3	16	November 6, 2004	February 19, 2005
4	15	March 26, 2007	April 19, 2007

== See also ==
- Uma Aventura na Casa Assombrada
