= Maria de Lurdes Rodrigues =

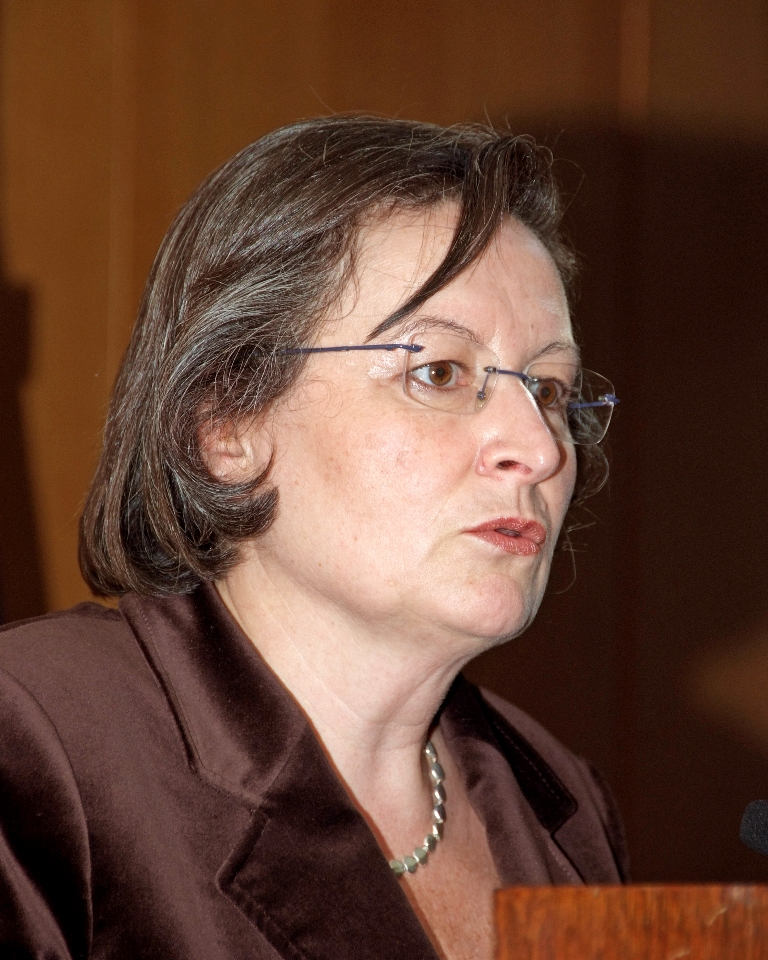

Minister of Education
- In office 12 March 2005 – 26 October 2009
- Prime Minister: José Sócrates
- Preceded by: Maria do Carmo Seabra
- Succeeded by: Isabel Alçada

Personal details
- Born: 19 March 1956 (age 70) Lisbon

Maria de Lurdes Reis Rodrigues (19 March 1956, Lisbon) is a Portuguese Professor of Sociology and former politician, associate professor (with Habilitation) and rector of ISCTE – University Institute of Lisbon, where she has taught since 1986.

She was the Portuguese representative at the Eurostat's Working Party of R&D and Innovation Survey (1996–2002), President of the Observatory of Sciences and Technologies at the Ministry of Science and Technology (1997–2002) and the national representative at the OECD Working Party on the Indicators for the Information Society (1999–2002).

Maria de Lurdes Rodrigues has an extensive scientific and academic career, having authored a long list of publications.

== Minister of Education ==
As Minister of Education of the 17th Constitutional Government of Portugal (Prime Minister José Sócrates's first Government) from 2005 to 2009, Maria de Lurdes Rodrigues launched a wide range of policies, some of which particularly controversial among teachers, unions, and even some sectors of the then ruling Socialist Party, such as the teacher career and performance assessment reform. These policies were assessed by the OECD.

During her mandate school results improved and school dropout rates fell significantly.

In 2009, the Portuguese pupils performed the highest combined increase in the OECD Programme for International Student Assessment exam scores as compared to 2006 results. Portugal ranked among the OECD average countries for the first time.

=== Main policies as Minister of Education ===
==== Elementary education reform ====
Elementary education reform had two main goals: to broaden the scope of learning activities and to build modern school environments. The former goal was achieved by the Full Time School Programme, that brought to schools curriculum enrichment activities such as English, Music, and Sports. The latter goal was fulfilled by closing down more about 2500 very small schools (less than 10 pupils) across the country and by building or refurbishing more than 400 fully equipped elementary schools with nursing schools. Both policies were implemented in close partnership with municipalities. Primary education reform was assessed by the OECD.

==== Pupils' Legal Status ====
A new pupils' legal status was set, forbidding grade retention due to unjustified school absence. This measure was taken upon research evidence that grade retentions do not promote success and are a step towards early school leaving.

==== Adult Education and Training Reform ====
In 2006, Rodrigues together with the Minister of Labour launched the New Opportunities Initiative, to foster adult education. Three years later, more than 1 million citizens had joined the initiative and 300.000 had received a school certificate.

==== Curricular reforms ====
MLR pushed public schools into vocational upper-secondary education, and from 2005 to 2009, the number of pupils attending vocational education grew from 30.000 to 126.000. As for basic education, nuclear subjects (Portuguese and Maths) were reinforced with an Action Plan for Maths and a National Reading Plan.

==== Schools' modernization ====
A National Secondary Schools Modernization Programme, run by Parque Escolar, was launched in 2007. The programme aims to rebuild more than 330 out of the 500 Portuguese public schools with secondary education. The first phases of the programme were assessed by the OECD. Schools' ICT capacity was boost by the 2007-2010 Technological Plan for Education. As a result of the plan, the ratio of pupils per computer with broadband connection fell from 18:1 in 2005 to 5:1 in 2009. 1-to-1 laptop distribution schemes for teachers and students were successfully deployed and acknowledged abroad.

== Post-ministerial career ==
After the end of the ministerial job, in 2009, Maria de Lurdes Rodrigues went back to the university, where she led a new master's program in public policy.

In the beginning of 2010, the Prime Minister appointed her President of the Luso-American Foundation.

Maria de Lurdes Rodrigues is since 2018Rector of ISCTE – University Institute of Lisbon (now in her 2nd term), a Portuguese public university.
