= Fernando Teixeira dos Santos =

Portuguese economist and academic (born 1951)

Fernando Teixeira dos Santos GOIH
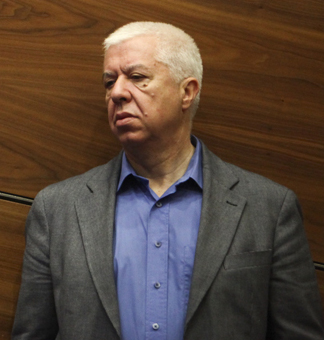

Minister of Finance Minister of State
- In office 21 July 2005 – 21 June 2011
- President: Jorge Sampaio; Aníbal Cavaco Silva
- Prime Minister: José Sócrates
- Preceded by: Luís Campos e Cunha
- Succeeded by: Vítor Gaspar

Secretary of State for Treasury and Finance
- In office 30 October 1995 – 25 October 1999
- President: Mário Soares; Jorge Sampaio
- Prime Minister: António Guterres
- Preceded by: Walter Marques (Treasury); Francisco Esteves de Carvalho (Finance)
- Succeeded by: António Nogueira Leite

Personal details
- Born: September 13, 1951 (age 75) Maia, Portugal
- Party: Independent
- Spouse: Maria Clementina Pereira Nunes
- Children: 2
- Education: University of Porto; University of South Carolina
- Profession: Economist; Professor

Fernando Teixeira dos Santos (born September 13, 1951) GOIH is a Portuguese economist and professor. He was Minister of Finance in the XVII and XVIII Constitutional Government of Portugal, led by José Sócrates.

== Career ==
Teixeira dos Santos has a degree in Economics by the University of Porto (1973), and a PhD in Economics by the University of South Carolina (1985). He embraced an academic career as university professor in the Faculdade de Economia da Universidade do Porto (FEP) (Economics School of the University of Porto).

He presided over the stock exchange authority of Portugal, the Comissão do Mercado de Valores Mobiliários (CMVM), until he received an invitation to enter the Portuguese government led by José Sócrates. He had been also the Secretary of State in the socialist governments of Prime Minister António Guterres. After had been Minister of Finances in the José Sócrates' cabinet, in 2011 he returned to his duties at the University of Porto's FEP.

== Minister ==
In July 2005, Prime Minister José Sócrates made a request to President of the Republic Jorge Sampaio for the resignation of the Minister of Finance, Luís Campos e Cunha, for reasons of a personal nature, family and fatigue, according to an official source. This same source also added that the Prime Minister, Jose Sócrates, "at the same time" proposed the nomination of Fernando Teixeira Dos Santos as minister of Finances to the President of the Republic, Jorge Sampaio. Minister of Finances Teixeira dos Santos was pivotal as the highest-ranked officer of the country, involved in the management of all the issues related to the Portuguese sovereign debt crisis. As the months went on the Portuguese debt crisis got worse, an International Monetary Fund rescue plan was put in place, and the Sócrates' cabinet was dissolved. The Socialists were ousted from the Portuguese Government after the 2011 Portuguese legislative election and Teixeira dos Santos returned to his academic career at the University of Porto.

== Duties in the Government of Portugal ==
- From 30 October 1995 to 25 October 1999: State Secretary of Treasury and Finance in the XIII Constitutional Government
- From 21 July 2005 to 26 October 2009: Minister of State and Finance in the XVII Constitutional Government
- From 26 October 2009 to 20 June 2011: Minister of Finance in the XVIII Constitutional Government

== Other activities ==
- African Development Bank (AfDB), Ex-Officio Member of the Board of Governors (2005-2011)
- Asian Development Bank (ADB), Ex-Officio Member of the Board of Governors (2005-2011)
- European Bank for Reconstruction and Development (EBRD), Ex-Officio Member of the Board of Governors (2005-2011)
- European Investment Bank (EIB), Ex-Officio Member of the Board of Governors (2005-2011)

== Recognition ==
- Grand Officer of the Order of Prince Henry, Portugal (28 June 2005)
- Grand-Cross of the Order of Christ, Portugal (9 June 2015)

== Personal life ==
Teixeira dos Santos is married to Maria Clementina Pereira Nunes with whom he had two children.

== Notes ==
The title Minister of State is attributed to ministers that have a role similar to deputy Prime Minister.
