= Face Oculta =

Portuguese political corruption and financial scandal

Face Oculta (Hidden Face) is a Portuguese nationwide political corruption, money-laundering and corporate tax evasion scandal, first uncovered in October 2009.

== Investigation ==
The Polícia Judiciária investigated the business group headed by Manuel Godinho, suspected of economic crimes and bribery of managers of public funds. All Godinho's companies, many of which were linked to business waste and waste management, are based in the Aveiro District. Godinho was arrested on October 28, 2009, in Aveiro, in relation to economic crimes involving an oxygen-treatment and environmental cleaning group. By early November, 14 people had been indicted. Several companies' employees were investigated, among them those of Petrogal and Portucel Soporcel. Also investigated were GNR officers, town hall civil servants (most notoriously from the Gouveia Municipality), businesspersons (most prominently Manuel Godinho and his right-hand man, Namércio Cunha, a formal suspect and alleged liaison between Godinho and REN, the company led by José Penedos), and former politicians - noted examples include Armando Vara (Millennium bcp) and José Penedos (REN). Former politician Armando Vara is reported by the police investigation to have had suspicious phone calls with the then Portuguese Prime Minister José Sócrates. These phone calls were recorded by the investigators. Sócrates denied any involvement, claiming he was only talking to a friend. Sócrates was not indicted at the time, but fourteen other people were. Sócrates was subsequently arrested in November 2014 and indicted in a separate investigation.

== Convictions ==
The case ended in September 2014 with the following being convicted:

- Armando Vara, former minister and former vice-president of Millennium BCP, received five years imprisonment.
- Manuel Godinho received seventeen years and six months imprisonment.
- José Penedos, former president of REN, received five years imprisonment.
- Paulo Penedos, son of José Penedos, received four years imprisonment.
- Maribel Rodriguez, Godinho’s secretary, received two years and nine months imprisonment suspended and a €3,000 fine.
- Namércio Cunha was sentenced to one year and 6 months imprisonment, but the prison-time was suspended.
