= Luís Amado =

Portuguese politician

Luís Amado GCC
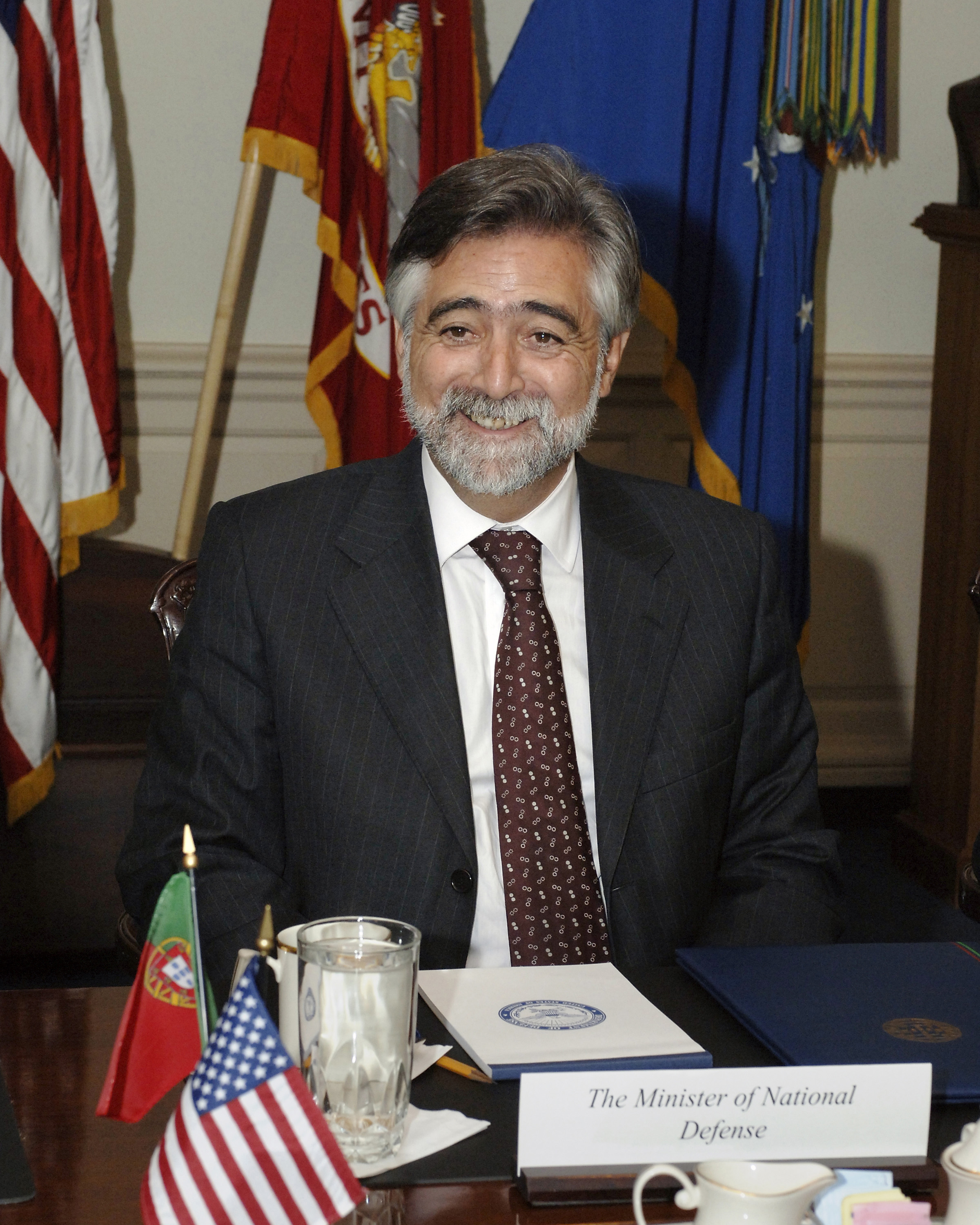
- Amado in 2005

Minister of Foreign Affairs
- In office 3 July 2006 – 21 June 2011
- Prime Minister: José Sócrates
- Preceded by: Diogo Freitas do Amaral
- Succeeded by: Paulo Portas

Minister of Defence
- In office 12 March 2005 – 3 July 2006
- Prime Minister: José Sócrates
- Preceded by: Paulo Portas
- Succeeded by: Nuno Severiano Teixeira

Personal details
- Born: 17 September 1953 (age 73) Lisbon, Portugal
- Party: Socialist

Luís Filipe Marques Amado GCC (born 17 September 1953) is a Portuguese politician who served as Minister of Defence, from 2005 to 2006, and Minister of Foreign Affairs, from 2006 to 2011, in the XVII and XVIII Constitutional Governments of Portugal, led by the Socialist Party. On 30 June 2007, he succeeded to the EU Council Presidency on behalf of Portugal.

== Education and personal life ==
Luís Amado graduated in economics from the Technical University of Lisbon, before becoming an advisor to the Portuguese National Defence Institute and Visiting Professor of Georgetown University. Married with two children, he has lived much of his life in Madeira, where he serves as a Deputy in the Regional Assembly.

== Government posts ==
- Deputy Secretary of State of Internal Administration, in the XIII Government. (1995–1997)
- Secretary of State for Foreign Affairs and Cooperation, in the XIII Government. (1997–1999)
- Secretary of State for Foreign Affairs and Cooperation, in the XIV Government. (1999–2002)
- Minister of Defence, in the XVII Government. (2005–2006)
- Minister of State and Foreign Affairs, in the XVII Government. (2006–2009)
- Minister of State and Foreign Affairs, in the XVIII Government. (2009–2011)

By late 2010, Amado was widely expected to be replaced after he had called for the centre-left Socialists to form a coalition government with the centre-right Social Democrats (PSD), the main opposition party at the time; Sócrates did not endorse the proposal.

== Other activities ==
- Center for International Relations and Sustainable Development (CIRSD), Member of the Board of Advisors
- European Council on Foreign Relations (ECFR), Member

== Honours ==
=== National ===
- Grand Cross of the Military Order of Christ (8 April 2009)

=== Foreign ===
- Argentina: Grand Cross of the Order of May (18 June 2003)
- Belgium: Grand Cross of the Order of Leopold II (9 October 2000)
- Chile: Grand Cross of Order of Merit (31 August 2010)
- France: Grand Officer of the National Order of Merit (29 November 1999)
- Germany: Grand Cross of the Order of Merit of the Federal Republic of Germany (26 May 2009)
- Greece: Grand Cross of the Order of Merit (17 March 2000)
- Holy See: Grand Cross of Order of St. Gregory the Great (3 September 2010)
- Jordan: Grand Cross of the Order of the Star of Jordan (28 May 2009)
- Lithuania: Grand Cross of the Order of the Lithuanian Grand Duke Gediminas (20 June 2007)
- Luxembourg: Grand Cross of the Order of the Oak Crown (6 December 2010)
- Norway: Grand Cross of Royal Norwegian Order of Merit (25 September 2009)
- Paraguay: Extraordinary Grand Cross of the National Order of Merit (7 December 2007)
- Poland: Grand Cross of the Order of Merit of the Republic of Poland (3 March 2009)
- Sovereign Military Order of Malta: Grand Cross of the Order pro Merito Melitensi (23 November 2010)
- Spain:
  - Grand Cross of the Order of Isabella the Catholic (28 September 2000)
  - Grand Cross of the Order of Civil Merit (22 October 2007)
- Sweden: Commander Grand Cross of the Order of the Polar Star (16 May 2008)

Political offices
Preceded by Paulo Portas	Minister of Defence; 2005–2006	Succeeded by Nuno Severiano Teixeira
Preceded by Diogo Freitas do Amaral	Minister of Foreign Affairs; 2006–2011	Succeeded by Paulo Portas
Preceded by Frank-Walter Steinmeier	President of the Council of the European Union; 2007	Succeeded by Dimitrij Rupel
