= Mário Lino =

Portuguese politician and civil engineer

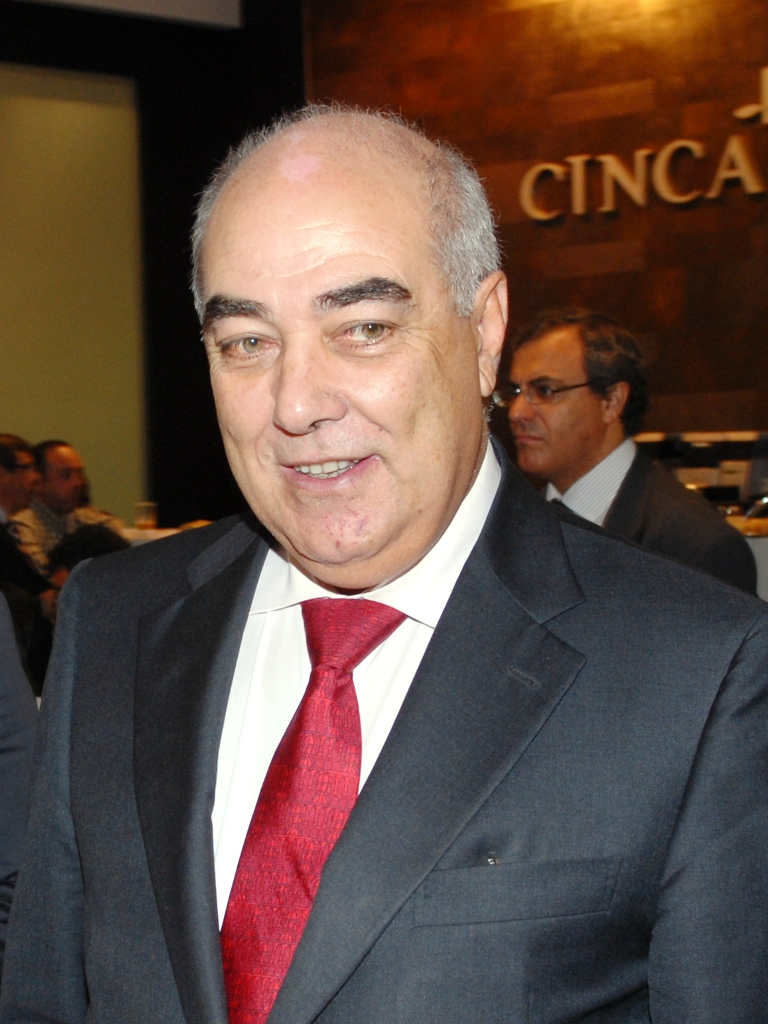

Minister of Public Works, Transportation and Communication
- In office 12 March 2005 – 26 October 2009
- President: Jorge Sampaio; Aníbal Cavaco Silva
- Prime Minister: José Sócrates
- Preceded by: António Mexia
- Succeeded by: António Mendonça

Personal details
- Born: Mário Lino Soares Correia; 31 May 1940 (age 85) Lisbon, Portugal
- Party: Socialist Party
- Profession: Civil engineer

Mário Lino Soares Correia (born 31 May 1940 in Lisbon), commonly known as Mário Lino, is a Portuguese civil engineer and former politician. He was the Minister of Public Works, Transportation and Communication in the 17th Constitutional Government of Portugal, from 2005 to 2009.
