= Ana Maria Magalhães (writer) =

Portuguese children and youth literature writer

Ana Maria Magalhães GOIH
- Born: Ana Maria Bastos de Oliveira Martinho; April 14, 1946 (age 80); Lisbon, Portugal
- Education: University of Lisbon
- Occupations: teacher; writer
- Spouse: Zeferino Coelho
- Parent: Tareka
- Relatives: Tozé Martinho (brother); Isabel da Nóbrega (aunt)
- Writing career
- Language: Portuguese
- Years active: 1982–present
- Genres: children's literature; young adult literature
- Notable work: Uma aventura series

Ana Maria Bastos de Oliveira Martinho GOIH (Lisbon, 14 April 1946), better known by her pen name Ana Maria Magalhães, is a Portuguese teacher and writer mainly dedicated to children's literature. She is primarily known for the Uma aventura series of books she wrote with her writing partner Isabel Alçada.

== Life and work ==
Ana Maria Magalhães was born in Lisbon on 14 April 1946. She graduated in philosophy at the University of Lisbon, and taught Portuguese and History at the basic education level from 1969 until her retirement.

She met Isabel Alçada in 1976 at the Escola Básica Fernando Pessoa where they were both teachers. The two teachers formed a friendship and writing partnership, publishing their first book, Uma Aventura na Cidade, in 1982. This would be become the first book of the Uma aventura series which would go on to have dozens of books.
