= Isabel Alçada =

Portuguese writer and teacher (born 1950)

Isabel Alçada GOIH GOIP
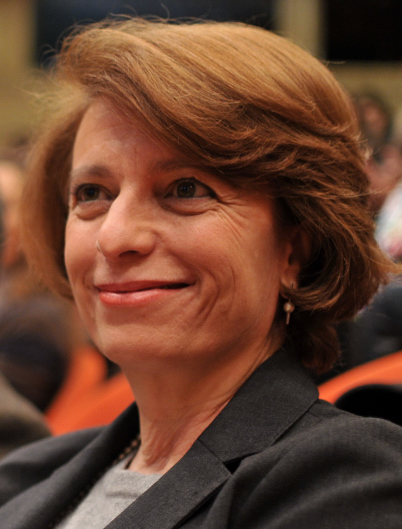
- Born: 29 May 1950 (age 76); Lisbon, Portugal
- Education: University of Lisbon, Boston University
- Occupations: teacher; writer; politician
- Writing career
- Language: Portuguese
- Years active: 1982–present
- Genres: children's literature; young adult literature
- Notable work: Uma aventura series

Minister of Education
- In office 2009–2011
- Prime Minister: José Sócrates
- Preceded by: Maria de Lurdes Rodrigues
- Succeeded by: Nuno Crato

Maria Isabel Girão de Melo Veiga Vilar GOIH GOIP (Lisbon, 29 May 1950), better known by her pen name, Isabel Alçada, is a Portuguese teacher, writer, and politician. As a writer, she is mainly dedicated to children's literature, being primarily known for writing the Uma aventura series of books with her writing partner Ana Maria Magalhães.

Alçada has also held a number of education-related government-appointed positions, including coordinator for the working group that would conceive the Portuguese school library network (1995–1996), and commissioner for the National Reading Plan (2006–2009). From 2009 to 2011 she was the Minister of Education in the XVIII Constitutional Government of Portugal.

== Life and work ==
Isabel Alçada was born in Lisbon on 29 May 1950. She attended Lycée français Charles Lepierre and took her bachelor's degree in philosophy at the University of Lisbon, later obtaining a master's degree in education sciences from the Boston University. In 1976, she decided to follow a career teaching Portuguese and History to 5th and 6th grade students (the 2nd cycle in the Portuguese basic education system); and in 1985, she joined the teaching staff of the Lisbon School of Education.

She met Ana Maria Magalhães in 1976 at the Escola Básica Fernando Pessoa where they were both teachers. The two teachers formed a friendship and writing partnership, publishing their first book, Uma Aventura na Cidade, in 1982. This would be become the first book of the Uma aventura series which would go on to have dozens of books.
