= Rui Pereira =

Portuguese politician and judge

Minister of Internal Administration
- In office 17 May 2007 – 21 June 2011
- Prime Minister: José Sócrates
- Preceded by: António Costa
- Succeeded by: Miguel Macedo

Secretary of State for Internal Administration
- In office 2000-12-18 – 2002-04-06
- Prime Minister: António Guterres

Personal details
- Born: 24 March 1956 (age 70) Duas Igrejas, Miranda do Douro
- Party: Socialist

Rui Pereira (born 24 March 1956) was a Portuguese Minister of Internal Administration (Ministro da Administração Interna). He took office on 17 May 2007 and ended service in 2011. Before that he was a Constitutional Court judge.

Preceded by António Costa	Minister of Internal Administration; 17 May 2007 – 21 June 2011	Incumbent
