= José Sócrates =

Prime Minister of Portugal from 2005 to 2011

José Sócrates GCIH
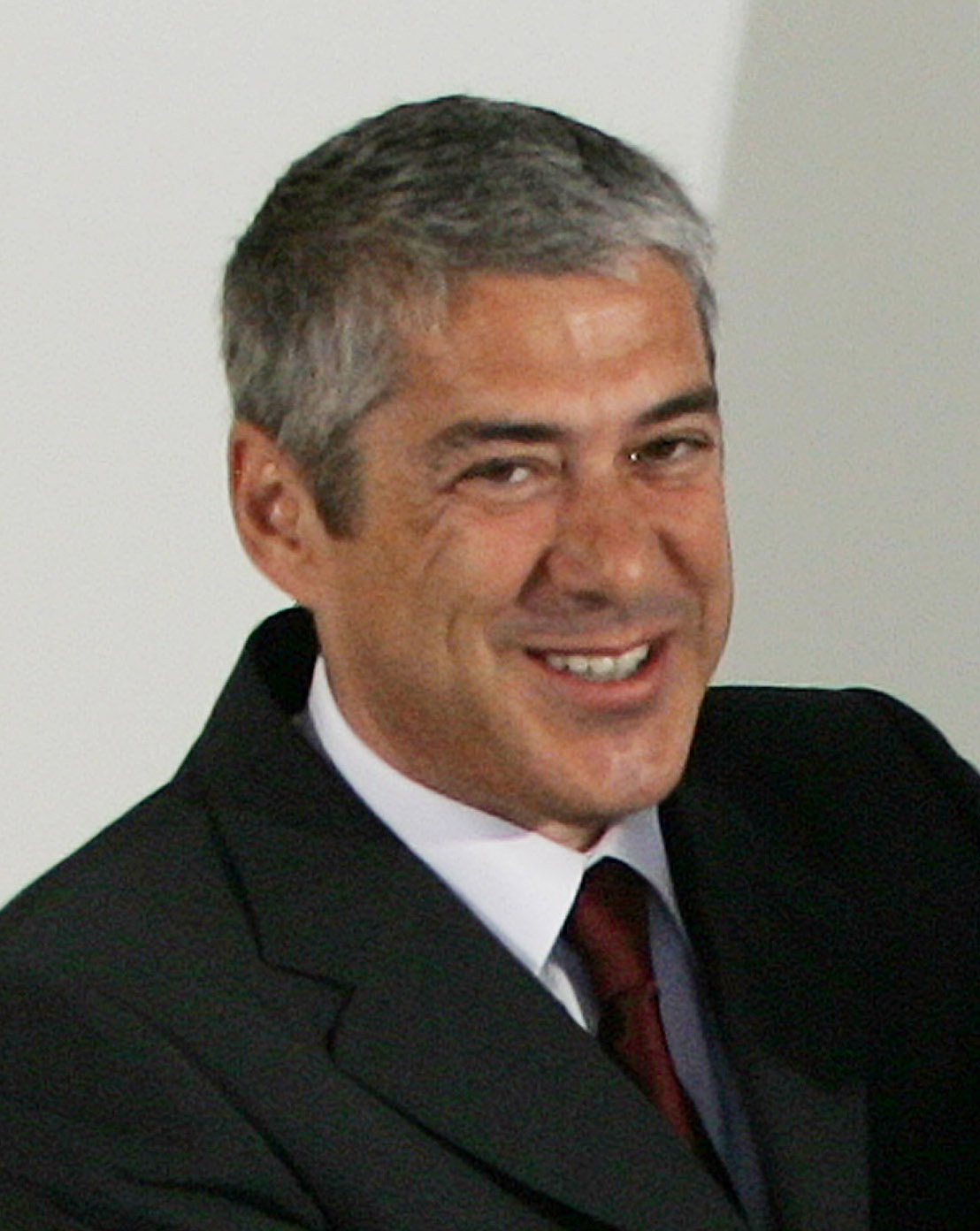
- Sócrates in 2006

Prime Minister of Portugal
- In office 12 March 2005 – 21 June 2011
- President: Jorge Sampaio; Aníbal Cavaco Silva
- Preceded by: Pedro Santana Lopes
- Succeeded by: Pedro Passos Coelho

Secretary-General of the Socialist Party
- In office 27 September 2004 – 23 July 2011
- President: António de Almeida Santos
- Preceded by: Eduardo Ferro Rodrigues
- Succeeded by: António José Seguro

Minister of Social Infrastructure
- In office 23 January 2002 – 6 April 2002
- Prime Minister: António Guterres
- Preceded by: Eduardo Ferro Rodrigues
- Succeeded by: Luís Valente de Oliveira

Minister of the Environment
- In office 25 October 1999 – 6 April 2002
- Prime Minister: António Guterres
- Preceded by: Elisa Ferreira
- Succeeded by: Isaltino Morais

Minister in the Cabinet of the Prime Minister
- In office 25 November 1997 – 25 October 1999
- Prime Minister: António Guterres
- Preceded by: Jorge Coelho
- Succeeded by: Armando Vara

Secretary of State Assistant to the Minister of the Environment
- In office 30 October 1995 – 25 November 1997
- Prime Minister: António Guterres
- Preceded by: Joaquim Poças Martins; António Taveira da Silva
- Succeeded by: José Guerreiro

Member of the Assembly of the Republic
- In office 13 August 1987 – 22 June 2011
- Constituency: Castelo Branco

Personal details
- Born: José Sócrates Carvalho Pinto de Sousa; 6 September 1957 (age 69) Vilar de Maçada, Alijó, Portugal
- Party: Independent (2018–present)
- Other political affiliations: Social Democratic Party (1974–1981); Socialist Party (1981–2018)
- Spouse: Sofia Costa Pinto Fava (Divorced)
- Children: 2
- Education: Polytechnic Institute of Coimbra; Lusíada University; Polytechnic Institute of Lisbon; Independente University; University Institute of Lisbon

José Sócrates Carvalho Pinto de Sousa GCIH (born 6 September 1957), commonly known as José Sócrates (European Portuguese: [ʒuˈzɛ ˈsɔkɾɐtɨʃ]), is a Portuguese politician who was the prime minister of Portugal from 12 March 2005 to 21 June 2011. For the second half of 2007, he acted as president-in-office of the Council of the European Union.

Sócrates grew up in the industrial city of Covilhã. He joined the centre-left Socialist Party in 1981 and was elected as a member of parliament in 1987. Sócrates entered the government in 1995, as secretary of state for Environment in the first cabinet of António Guterres. Two years later, he became Minister of Youth and Sports (where he helped to organize Portugal's successful bid to host UEFA Euro 2004) and in 1999 became Minister for Environment. Sócrates prominence rose during the governments of António Guterres to the point that when the prime minister resigned in 2001, he considered appointing Sócrates as his successor.

In opposition, José Sócrates was elected leader of the Socialist Party in 2004 and led the party to its first absolute majority in the 2005 election. By then, Portugal was experiencing an economic crisis, marked by stagnation and a difficult state of public finances. Like the preceding centre-right government, Sócrates implemented a policy of fiscal austerity and structural reforms. Among the most important reforms were the 2007 Social Security reform and the 2009 labour law reform. His government also restructured the provision of public services, closing thousands of elementary schools and dozens of health care facilities and maternity wards in rural areas and small cities. Despite austerity, Sócrates's government intended to boost economic growth through government-sponsored investments, namely in transportation, technology and energy as well as in health and school infrastructure. The government launched several public–private partnerships to finance such projects. Internally, Sócrates was accused of having an authoritarian style and of trying to control media, while internationally he completed the negotiations of Lisbon Treaty and had close ties with leaders such as the prime minister of Spain José Luis Rodriguez Zapatero and the president of Venezuela Hugo Chavez. The first Sócrates government was initially able to reduce the budget deficit and controlling public debt, but economic growth lagged.

In 2008–09, with the Great Recession starting to hit Portugal and facing recession and high unemployment, austerity was waned as part of the European economic stimulus plan. Nevertheless, support for Sócrates and the Socialists eroded and the ruling party lost its majority in the 2009 election. The second government of José Sócrates faced a deterioration of the economic and financial state of the country, with skyrocketing deficit and growing debt. Austerity was resumed in 2010 while the country entered a hard financial crisis in the context of the European debt crisis.

On 23 March 2011, Sócrates submitted his resignation to President Aníbal Cavaco Silva after the Parliament rejected a new austerity package (the fourth in a year), leading to the 2011 snap election. Financial status of the country deteriorated and on 6 April Sócrates caretaker government requested a bail-out program which was conceded. The €78 billion IMF/European Union bailout to Portugal thus started and would last until May 2014. Sócrates lost the snap election held on 5 June 2011 and resigned as Secretary-General of the Socialist Party. For most of his political career, Sócrates was associated with several corruption cases, notably Independente University and Freeport cases.

On 21 November 2014 he was arrested in Lisbon, accused of corruption, tax evasion, and money laundering, becoming the first former Prime Minister in the history of the country to be thus accused. On 24 November Sócrates was remanded in custody on preliminary charges of corruption and tax fraud. He was held in Évora prison until 4 September 2015 when he left the prison for a relative's house in Lisbon, where he remained under house arrest until 16 October 2015. That day, a judge released him from house arrest, allowing him to await the end of the investigation in freedom, although remaining forbidden from leaving the country or contacting other suspects of the case. The police investigation, known as Operation Marquis continued until his indictment in October 2017. In 2018, Sócrates left the Socialist Party.

== Biography ==
=== Early years ===
José Sócrates was born in Porto on 6 September 1957, and was registered as a newborn in Vilar de Maçada, Alijó municipality, in northeastern Portugal, since the locality was his family ancestral homeland. However, the young José Sócrates lived throughout his childhood and teen years with his father, a divorced building designer, in the city of Covilhã, Beiras e Serra da Estrela, in central inland Portugal, in the Centro region. His parents are Fernando Pinto de Sousa (Vilar de Maçada, Alijó, 15 November 1926 – Porto, 18 July 2011) and wife and remote relative Maria Adelaide de Carvalho Monteiro (b. Vilar de Maçada, Alijó, 8 October 1931). He had two younger siblings, António Carvalho Pinto de Sousa, born circa 1962, died in 2011, and Ana Maria Carvalho Pinto de Sousa, died in 1988. He is a descendant of the illegitimate daughter of António José Girão Teixeira Lobo Barbosa (Porto, Sé, 9 January 1715 – Alijó, Vilar de Maçada), Fidalgo of the Royal Household and Knight of the Order of Christ.

=== Education ===
José Sócrates studied in Covilhã's basic and secondary schools, until the age of 18. Then, in 1975, he went to Coimbra in order to attend a higher education institution. He earned in 1979 his 4-year bacharelato degree as a civil technical engineer from the Instituto Superior de Engenharia de Coimbra (in 1988 incorporated into the Instituto Politécnico de Coimbra). From 1987 to 1993, he took law classes at Universidade Lusíada, a private university in Lisbon, but failed to graduate. In 1994/95, already a well-known politician, he briefly attended the Instituto Superior de Engenharia de Lisboa where he completed some academic disciplines in order to get a CESE diploma (a complementary diploma to his bacharelato degree because until 1999 the polytechnic institutions did not offer licenciatura degrees), but instead, under circumstances which would provoke a controversy in 2007, he earned in 1996 the licenciatura (licentiate degree) in civil engineering from the Universidade Independente, a private university in Lisbon which was shut down by Portuguese authorities in 2007/2008. He also has an MBA degree awarded in 2005 by ISCTE, a public university institute in Lisbon, that he obtained after had attended successfully the first year of a 2-year master's degree program of ISCTE that he did not complete. After his tenure as prime minister of Portugal ended in 2011, Sócrates and his elder son, moved to Paris where Sócrates attended the Institut d'Etudes Politiques de Paris (known as SciencesPo). In 2013, SciencesPo awarded him his master's degree in political science. His 2013 book Confiança do Mundo – Sobre a Tortura Em Democracia was based on his masters thesis there; however, there was some dispute as to its authorship.

=== Political career ===
José Sócrates was one of the founders of JSD (the youth branch of PSD – Portuguese Social Democratic Party) before changing his political affiliation and applying for membership in the PS – Portuguese Socialist Party. He has been a member of the Socialist Party since 1981. José Sócrates served as a technical engineer for the Covilhã City Council, and has been elected a member of the Portuguese Parliament since 1987, representing the Castelo Branco electoral district. While serving as the chairperson of the Castelo Branco Federation of the Socialist Party (1983–1996), he was elected to the Party's National Secretariat in 1991. José Sócrates was ousted by the Board of the Guarda Municipality in 1990 and 1991, after being warned several times because of poor quality of construction projects and lack of monitoring of the construction works. Sócrates was threatened with disciplinary action for wrongdoings in the technical direction of particular works of whose projects he was the author, but despite being ousted from this capacity, he was never penalized. In addition, as a Member of the Parliament, Sócrates was not allowed by law to work as a technical engineer between 1987 and 1991. From 1989 to 1996, he served as a member of the Covilhã Municipal Assembly. He served as spokesperson on environmental affairs for the Socialist Party from 1991 to 1995. In 1995, he entered government as secretary of state for Environment in the first government of António Guterres. Two years later, Sócrates became Minister for Youth and Sports and was one of the organizers of the EURO 2004 cup in Portugal. He became Minister for Environment in Guterres's second government in 1999. Following the elections of 2002 (won by José Manuel Durão Barroso), Sócrates became a member of the opposition in the Portuguese Parliament. Meanwhile, he also had a program of political analysis, hosted jointly with Pedro Santana Lopes on RTP. After the resignation of Ferro Rodrigues as party leader in 2004, he won a bid for the post of secretary-general against Manuel Alegre and João Soares, winning the vote of nearly 80% of party members on 24 September 2004. After the victory of his party in the 2005 legislative election, Sócrates was called on 24 February by President Jorge Sampaio to form a new government – the XVII Constitutional Government. After the 2009 legislative election, held on 27 September 2009, José Sócrates was elected for a second term as prime minister of Portugal. He was also a Member of the Portuguese Council of State as the prime minister.

=== Personal life ===
==== Family and residence ====
Sócrates is divorced from Sofia Costa Pinto Fava, an engineer, with whom he has two sons, José Miguel Fava Pinto de Sousa (b. 1993) and Eduardo Fava Pinto de Sousa (b. 1995). Sofia is a daughter of José Manuel Carvalho Fava, an architect, and Clotilde Mesquita (daughter of Armando Mesquita and Palmira da Costa Pinto), engineer and sister of Alexandre Mesquita Carvalho Fava and Mara Mesquita Carvalho Fava.

Sócrates lives in Lisbon, although he used to be a registered elector of the municipality of Covilhã, the place where he voted until the law was changed (since after the mid-2000s every person votes in one's residential area). Since late 2018, he has been living in Ericeira.

==== Health and well-being ====
José Sócrates had photos of himself taken during his morning jog at places like the Red Square in Moscow, Rio de Janeiro's Copacabana, Luanda, and Lisbon. In January 2008, a smoking ban came into force in Portugal's public buildings and on public transport, but Sócrates was reported to have been smoking in May during a private state flight to Venezuela where he met Hugo Chávez. He has since admitted it was a mistake, apologized and promised to quit smoking. In addition, he claimed he was not aware he was breaking the law when he did so. However, by 2012, after he had left the spotlight, the Portuguese newspaper Diário de Notícias reported he was no longer a non-smoker.

==== Fandom ====
He is a supporter of SL Benfica.

== Prime minister of Portugal ==
After the Portuguese legislative election of 2005, Sócrates was called on 24 February by President Jorge Sampaio to form a new government. Sócrates and his first government – the XVII Constitutional Government – took office on 12 March 2005.

After the Portuguese legislative election of 2009, held on 27 September 2009, José Sócrates was elected for a second term as prime minister of Portugal. The new government was sworn into office on 26 October 2009.

On 5 June 2011, after the 2011 legislative election, the Social Democratic Party led by Pedro Passos Coelho won, forcing Sócrates's resignation as Secretary-General of the Socialist Party and as prime minister of Portugal.

=== José Sócrates's cabinet ===
Sócrates headed the government beginning on 12 March 2005, comprising the XVII and XVIII Governos Constitucionais (17th and 18th Constitutional Governments).

==== Membership ====
Ministry	Incumbent	Term
State and Internal Administration	António Costa	13 March 2005 – 17 May 2007
State and Internal Administration	Rui Pereira	17 May 2007 – 21 June 2011
State and Foreign Affairs	Diogo Freitas do Amaral	13 March 2005 – 3 July 2006
State and Foreign Affairs	Luís Amado	3 July 2006 – 21 June 2011
State and Finances	Luís Campos e Cunha	13 March – 21 July 2005
State and Finances	Fernando Teixeira dos Santos	21 July 2005 – 21 June 2011
Presidency	Pedro Silva Pereira	13 March 2005 – 21 June 2011
National Defence	Luís Amado	13 March 2005 – 3 July 2006
National Defence	Nuno Severiano Teixeira	3 July 2006 – 26 October 2009
National Defence	Augusto Santos Silva	2 October 2009 – 21 June 2011
Justice	Alberto Costa	13 March 2005 – 26 October 2009
Justice	Alberto Martins	26 October 2009 – 21 June 2011
Environment	Francisco Nunes Correia	13 March 2005 – 26 October 2009
Environment	Dulce Álvaro Pássaro	26 October 2009 – 21 June 2011
Economy, Innovation and Development	Manuel Pinho	13 March 2005 – 2 July 2009
Economy, Innovation and Development	Fernando Teixeira dos Santos	2 July – 26 October 2009
Economy, Innovation and Development	José Vieira da Silva	26 October 2009 – 21 June 2011
Agriculture	Jaime Silva	13 March 2005 – 26 October 2009
Agriculture	António Soares Serrano	26 October 2009 – 21 June 2011
Public Works and Communications	Mário Lino	13 March 2005 – 26 October 2009
Public Works and Communications	António Augusto Mendonça	26 October 2009 – 21 June 2011
Labour and Social Solidarity	José Vieira da Silva	13 March 2005 – 26 October 2009
Labour and Social Solidarity	Maria Helena André	26 October 2009 – 21 June 2011
Health	António Correia de Campos	13 March 2005 – 30 January 2008
Health	Ana Jorge	30 January 2008 – 21 June 2011
Education	Maria de Lurdes Rodrigues	13 March 2005 – 26 October 2009
Education	Isabel Alçada	26 October 2009 – 21 June 2011
Science, Technology and High Education	Mariano Gago	13 March 2005 – 21 June 2011
Culture	Isabel Pires de Lima	13 March 2005 – 30 January 2008
Culture	José António Pinto Ribeiro	30 January 2008 – 26 October 2009
Culture	Gabriela Canavilhas	26 October 2009 – 21 June 2011
Parliamentary Affairs	Augusto Santos Silva	13 March 2005 – 26 October 2009
Parliamentary Affairs	Jorge Lacão	26 October 2009 – 21 June 2011

==== Major policies ====
===== Administrative reforms =====
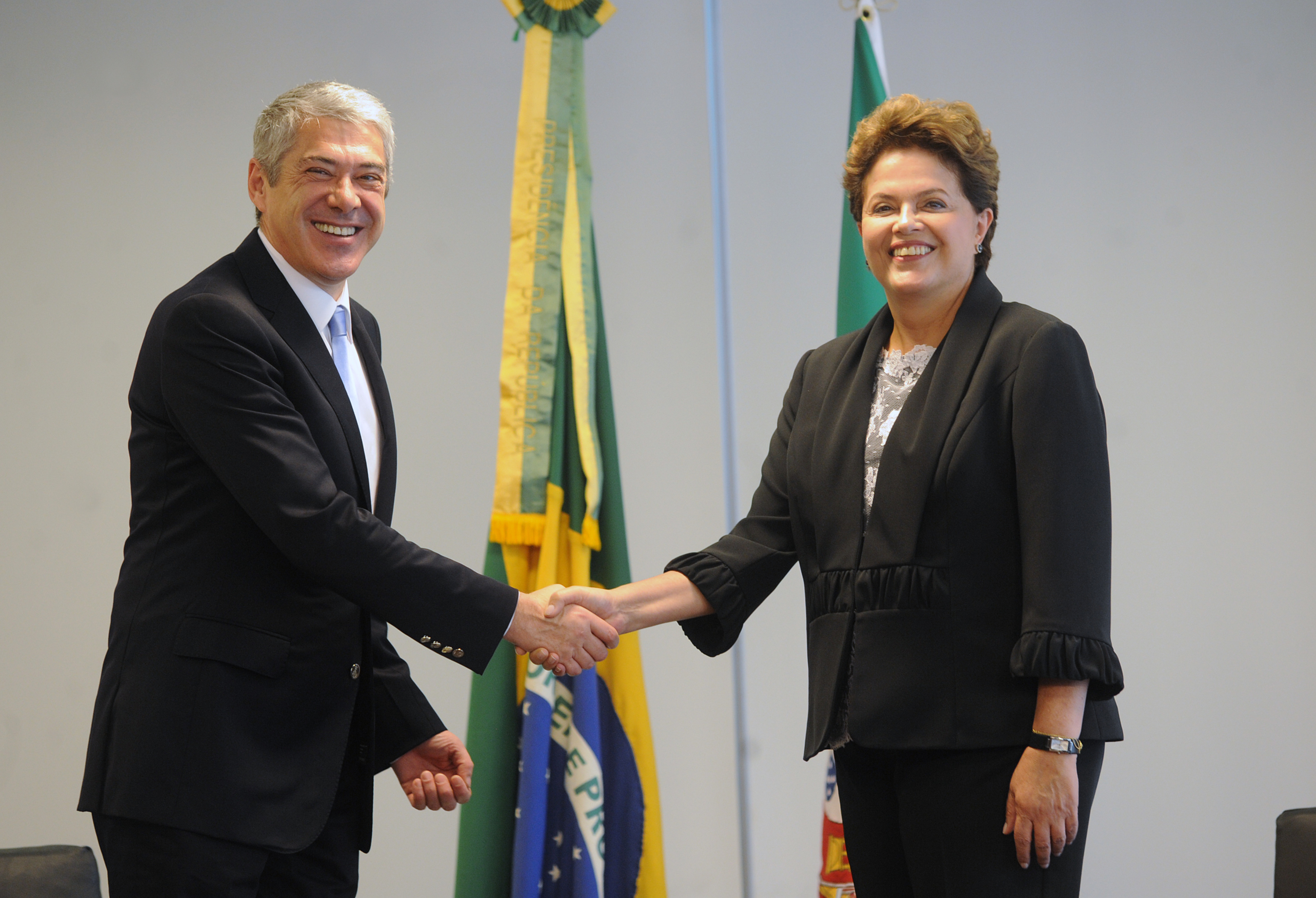
José Sócrates and President Dilma Rousseff in 2011

The XVII Governo Constitucional government, headed by Prime Minister José Sócrates, tried to create new rules and implement reforms aiming at better efficiency and rationalized resource allocation in the public sector, fighting civil servant overcapacity (excedentários) and reducing bureaucracy for both citizens and companies (e.g.: empresa na hora, PRACE – Programa de Reestruturação da Administração Central do Estado, and SIMPLEX – Programa de Simplificação Administrativa e Legislativa), among others. Since the XVII Governo Constitucional government (with José Sócrates as prime minister and Teixeira dos Santos as minister of finance) Portugal's fiscal policy improved with a steady increase of the number of taxpayers and the growth of the receipt amount from State taxation. However these policies had little effect, and the country's public debt and deficit were both out of control by 2010, along with a record high unemployment rate. João Bilhim directed in 2005 the committee responsible for the Programme for Restructuring the State's Central Administration (PRACE) but was said to be disappointed with the results. Several reforms and measures implemented in 2006/2007 by the government (XVII Governo Constitucional – headed by Prime Minister José Sócrates), resulted in improved welfare system financial sustainability but reduced income expectations of future pensioners up to 40%. In addition, economically active people must work for more years before retirement than formerly. A sustainability factor was also introduced, giving employees the option of working longer or receiving slightly lower pensions, as life expectancy forecasts increase. After the Portuguese regionalization referendum of 1998 where the "No" to regionalization of the mainland into eight administrative regions was victorious, the XVII Governo Constitucional government announced in January 2009 its firm intention of starting again a regionalization process for Portugal. According to this governmental project, mainland Portugal was to be regionalized into five regions with a wide range of administrative autonomy, using the already established NUTS II system: Alentejo, Algarve, Lisbon and Tagus Valley, Central Portugal and Northern Portugal. The transformation of the Portuguese public administration from a traditional one to an information technology-based multiplatform service, was praised by the European Commission through its European Union benchmark for the sector, that consecutively placed Portugal in the first position of the ranking in 2009 and 2010.

===== Technological plan =====
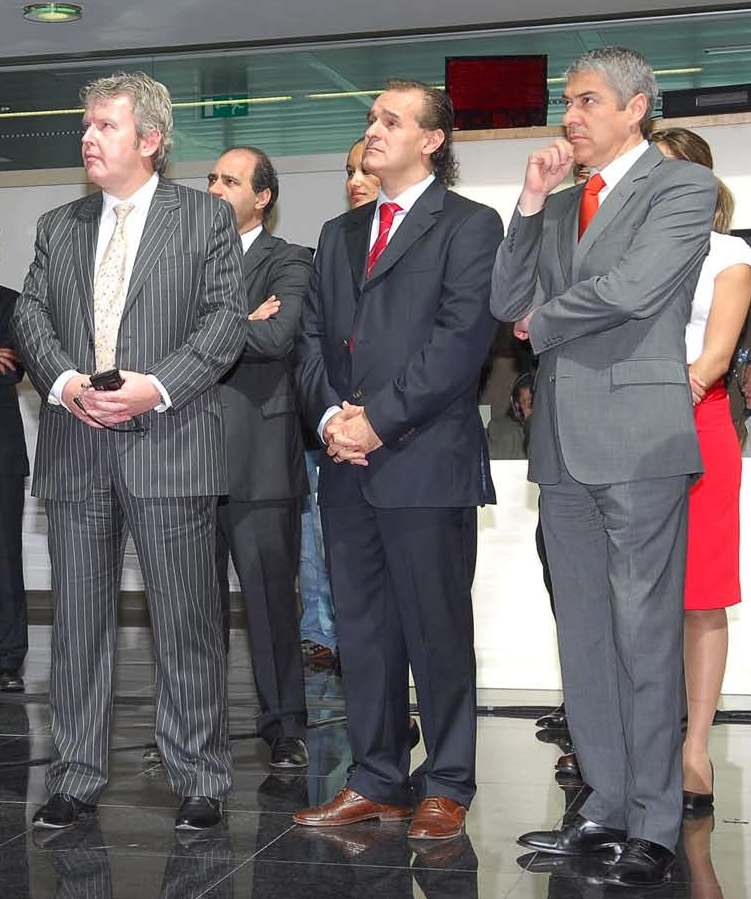
Chris Dedicoat, Helder Antunes, and Sócrates at the 2008 Cisco Portugal Official Inauguration.

One of the government's main policies was the Plano Tecnológico (Technological Plan), aimed at increasing Portugal's competitivity through the modernization of its economy. The plan consisted of three key areas: knowledge, technology and innovation. A low-cost Intel-based netbook for use by children announced by Sócrates's government cabinet, named Magalhães (after Fernão de Magalhães) and packaged and assembled for the Portuguese school-age children and the low-to-middle income economy export market by the Portuguese company J.P. Sá Couto, headquartered in Matosinhos, Norte region, was among the government's innovations under the Technological Plan. Governmental efforts in the technological domain also included state support of a Portuguese factory that was owned by the German-based semiconductor company Qimonda AG, in Vila do Conde, Norte region, when the parent company filed a bankruptcy petition with the local court in Munich, Germany, in early 2009. Qimonda Portugal was at the time one of the top Portuguese net exporters.

The European Innovation Scoreboard of 2010 placed Portugal-based innovation in 15th position, as a result of an impressive increase in innovation expenditure and output.

===== Educational reforms =====
The government allocated more resources for education policy and reorganised the sector aiming more choice and better quality in professional technical education. Enhanced and improved professional technical education programs were implemented in 2007 in an effort to revitalize this sector which had been almost discontinued after the Carnation Revolution of 1974. Other education reforms included more financial support for students (in all educational levels), systematic teaching and school evaluation, the compulsory closing of some problematic and unreliable private higher education institutions (like the Independente University and Moderna University) by the Minister for Science, Technology and Higher Education, Mariano Gago, and a will to rank and benchmark the higher education institutions through a newly created state-run agency (the Agência de Acreditação e Avaliação do Ensino Superior). During the XVII Governo Constitucional, the pan-European Bologna Process was fully implemented in Portugal.

On the other hand, the government created a policy of certification and equivalence of qualifications for adult people with low levels of formal education who want a 4th, 6th, 9th or 12th grade equivalence without returning to school (for example, through this process, called Novas Oportunidades, adults—18 years old and older—with the 9th grade might be granted an equivalence to the 12th grade after a process ranging from a part-time 3-month programme or a 1-day-per-week 8-month programme; those who have less than 9th grade have a similar programme to get the 9th grade certification and can then apply to the 12th grade programme). The curricula do not include any classical high school discipline or a traditional examination process. These diplomas are awarded based on vaguely construed life experience. Some critics alleged this policy was an effort to make up the poor national statistical indicators on education, with little impact on the quality of the work force's qualification of Portugal in the European Union context.

According to the OECD's Programme for International Student Assessment (PISA), the average Portuguese 15-year-old student was for many years underrated and underachieving in terms of reading literacy, mathematics and science knowledge in the OECD, nearly tied with the Italian and just above those from countries like Greece, Turkey and Mexico. However, since 2010, PISA results for Portuguese students improved dramatically. The PISA 2009 report states that the average Portuguese 15-year-old student, when rated in terms of reading literacy, mathematics and science knowledge, is placed at the same level as those students from the United States, Sweden, Germany, Ireland, France, Denmark, United Kingdom, Hungary and Taipei, with 489 points (493 is the average). However, a couple of weeks later, the Portuguese Ministry of Education announced a 2010 report published by its office for educational evaluation GAVE (Gabinete de Avaliação do Ministério da Educação) which criticized the results of PISA 2009 report and claimed that the average Portuguese teenage student had profound handicaps in terms of expression, communication and logic, as well as a low performance when asked to solve problems.

===== Transportation developments =====
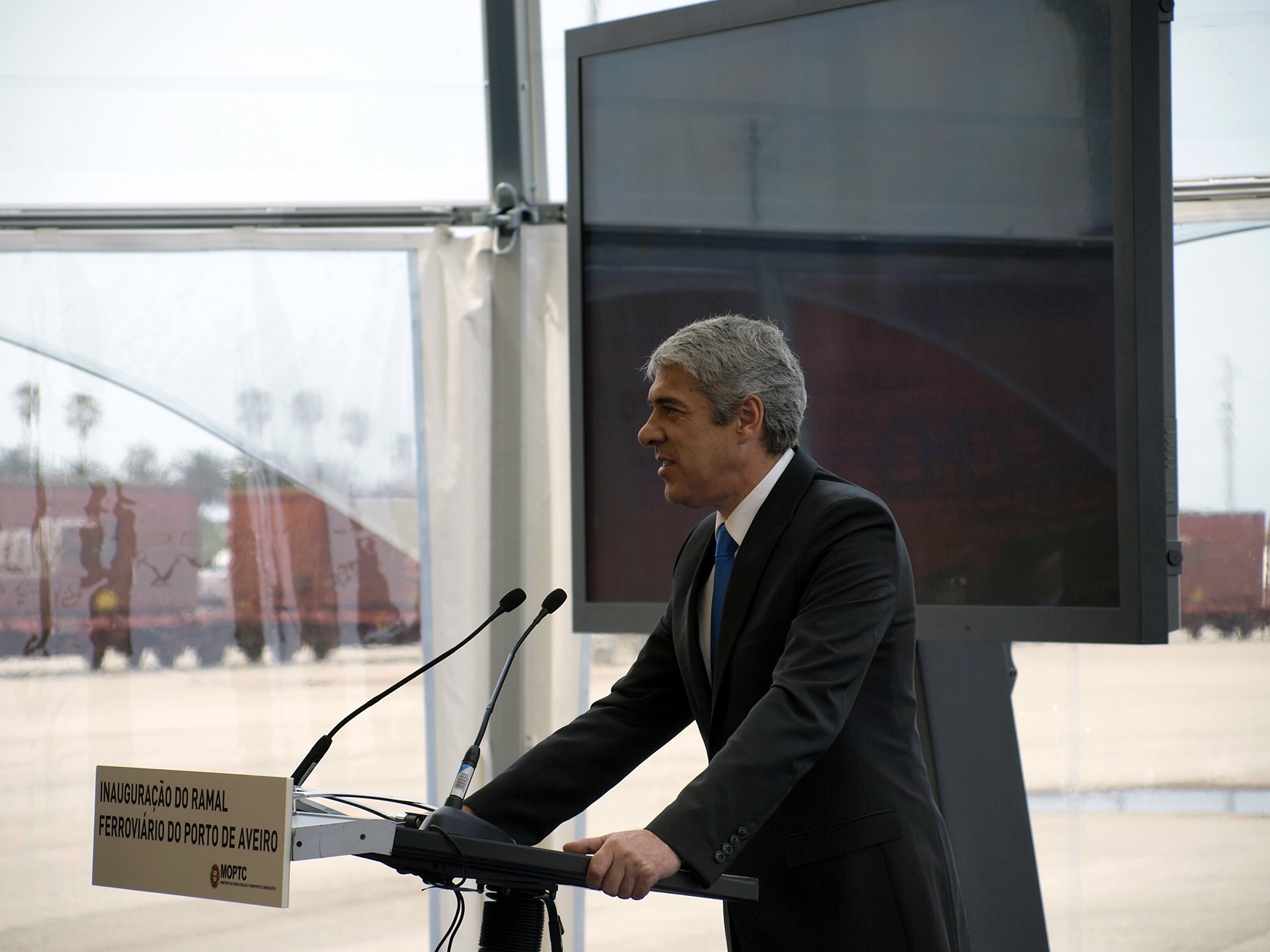
Sócrates speaking in the ceremonial opening of a new railway line, on 27 March 2010.

Prime Minister José Sócrates and his government team supported the decision of building new transportation infrastructure such as a new airport for Lisbon and a high speed rail network. For months the government of Prime Minister José Sócrates insisted the country's only option for a new airport was in the Ota region north of Lisbon. But a powerful lobby, headed by local business honchos and given the imprimatur of the Portuguese president Aníbal Cavaco Silva, forced Sócrates's Government into reversal, by bringing an alternative site for the new airport – the Portuguese Air Force's shooting range in Alcochete east of Lisbon. A study commissioned by a group of businesspeople said the Alcochete site would save taxpayers as much as €3bn in construction costs, and would have less of an environmental impact. The government argued that Ota was a key piece of its overall transport strategy, which included highspeed rail lines to Spain, but even so recognized that the project wasn't finalized and that a debate on the pros and cons of both sites would be worthwhile. Then the government commissioned a technical study to the state-run civil engineering laboratory (Portuguese: Laboratório Nacional de Engenharia Civil) comparing both locations one to each other. Following the conclusions of that study, on 10 January 2008 Prime Minister José Sócrates announced the option Alcochete as the most rational choice for a new airport for Lisbon.

===== Other =====
In 2007, the XVII Governo Constitucional, headed by Prime Minister José Sócrates, legalised abortion in Portugal after a referendum. Voters were being asked to decide whether to make abortion legal in the first 10 weeks of pregnancy, if carried out at the woman's request in a registered clinic. Despite the turnout for a referendum being too low (40%; 50% needed) to be legally binding, José Sócrates said: "Our interest is to fight clandestine abortion and we have to produce a law that respects the result of the referendum." This socialist government cabinet also announced its intention to legalize same-sex marriage at some point during its mandate. Same-sex marriage in Portugal was legalized on 17 May 2010.

Also, in 2009, through the Decree-Law 91/2009, the rights of fathers and mothers were equalled under the law (see also Fathers' rights).

After a sharp increase of the violent crime rate in Portugal during the XVII Governo Constitucional government (2005–2009), the minister of internal administration, Rui Pereira, announced in February 2009 the expansion of the police force through the recruitment of 2,000 new police officers, 7,000 new state-of-the-art police weapons, 1,000 bulletproof vests, among other measures.

Until 2010, for stock held for more than twelve months the capital gain was exempt. The capital gain of stock held for shorter periods of time was taxable on 10%. From 2010 onwards, for residents, all capital gain of stock and other assets above €500 is taxable on 20%. Investment funds, banks and corporations are in general exempted of capital gain tax over stock.

Various measures aimed at helping families, young people and pensioners were also carried out.

==== Presidency of the Council of the European Union ====
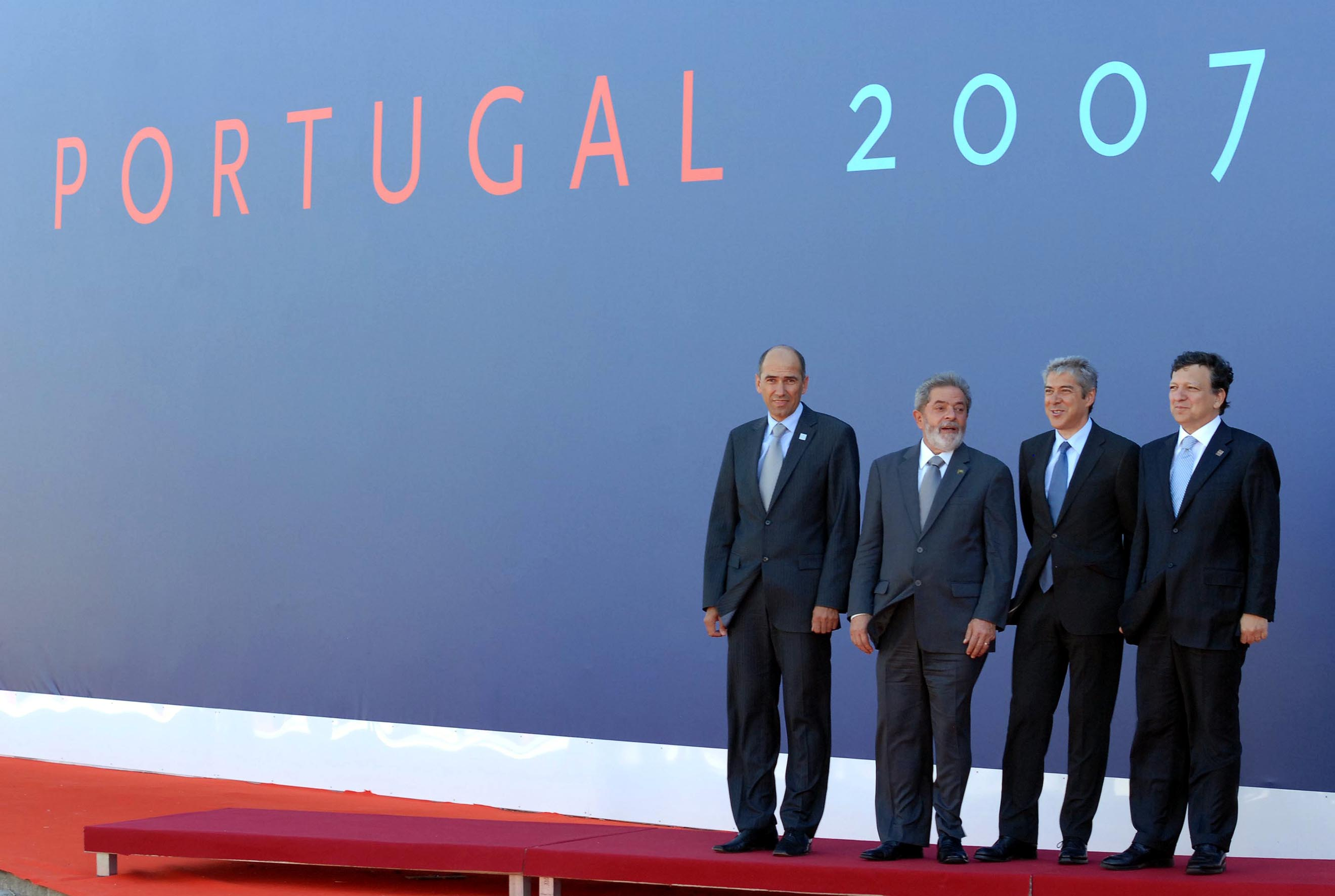
José Sócrates, Brazilian President Lula da Silva, President of the European Commission José Manuel Barroso and Slovenian Prime Minister Janez Janša during the EU-Brazil conference in Lisbon 2007

José Sócrates, as prime minister of Portugal, presided over the rotative presidency of the Council of the European Union for the period July–December 2007. In this post, Sócrates and his team focused on the EU-Brazil (1st EU-Brazil summit) and EU-African Union (2007 Africa-EU Summit) relations, as well as in the approval of the Treaty of Lisbon. The Portuguese Parliament voted to ratify the Treaty of Lisbon on 23 April 2008. After the Irish referendum on 12 June 2008, Prime Minister José Sócrates said he saw the Irish "No" to the treaty as a "personal defeat" after it was signed by EU leaders in the Portuguese capital. A second referendum was held in Ireland in 2009, and the outcome was the approval of the Treaty of Lisbon by all EU member states, including Ireland.

==== Economic crisis ====
From 2005 to 2010, José Sócrates's cabinet faced increasing challenges due to economic and financial downturn. The Portuguese economy was in crisis since 2002 owing to stagnation and high unemployment; in the late 2000s, Europe's sovereign debt crisis led to huge deficits and even higher rampant unemployment in Portugal. International financial markets compelled the Portuguese Government, like other European governments, to make radical changes in economic policy. Thus, in September 2010, the Portuguese Government announced a fresh austerity package following other Eurozone partners, aiming to halve its budget deficit by 2011 with a series of tax hikes and salary cuts for public servants. In 2009, the deficit had been 9.4%, one of the highest in the Eurozone and way above the European Union's Stability and Growth Pact 3% limit. The Portuguese Government earlier targeted a 2011 shortfall of 5.1% but a growing crisis sparked by chronic budget expenditure, massive debt and deficit problems, forced Portugal to take even more difficult measures. In September, pressure from the International Monetary Fund, Ecofin, OECD and the main opposition party, forced Sócrates's cabinet to adopt successive packages of radical austerity measures, contrary to what had been promised during the previous electoral campaigns. A report published in January 2011 by the Diário de Notícias, a leading Portuguese newspaper, demonstrated that in the period between the Carnation Revolution in 1974 and 2010, the democratic Portuguese Republic governments have encouraged over expenditure and investment bubbles through unclear public-private partnerships. This has funded numerous ineffective and unnecessary external consultancy and advising committees and firms, allowed considerable slippage in state-managed public works, inflated top management and head officers' bonuses and wages, causing a persistent and lasting recruitment policy that has boosted the number of unnecessary public servants. The economy has also been damaged by risky credit, public debt creation and mismanaged European structural and cohesion funds for almost four decades. Apparently, the Prime Minister Sócrates's cabinet was not able to forecast or prevent any of this when symptoms first appeared in 2005, and later was incapable of doing anything to ameliorate the situation when the country was on the verge of bankruptcy in 2011.

On 6 April 2011, having already resigned as prime minister, Sócrates went on television to announce that Portugal, facing bankruptcy, would request financial assistance from the IMF (at the time managed by Dominique Strauss-Kahn) and the European Financial Stability Facility, as Greece and the Republic of Ireland had already done. The announcement was made 48 hours after Sócrates had categorically denied the move would be needed.

==== Fall of government ====
On 23 March 2011, Sócrates resigned following passage of a no confidence motion sponsored by all five opposition parties in parliament over spending cuts and tax increases. Before the vote, Sócrates had stated that he would resign if the vote for further austerity measures didn't pass. As a result, a general election was held on 5 June 2011.

The Portuguese government fell a day before an EU summit was due to take place to finalise the EU's response to countries requiring a bailout in the future.

After losing the Portuguese legislative election of 2011, held on 5 June 2011, he resigned from Secretary-General of the Socialist Party.

== Controversies ==
=== Sócrates–Independente affair ===
In March 2007, Universidade Independente (UnI), a private university in Lisbon, was placed under investigation for alleged irregularities on several matters.

In that same month, Sócrates's licenciatura degree in civil engineering by Universidade Independente was put under enormous public scrutiny. Journalists found that qualifications awarded did not follow procedure and that four of the five academic disciplines were given in the private university by the same professor, António José Moraes, a socialist government appointee. A fifth academic discipline, "technical English" was given by the Independente's rector. A strong case was built up related to possible false declarations by José Sócrates regarding his university degree, and the way he was awarded this degree in civil engineering. Among other issues, the Independente degree in civil engineering was not an accredited degree, a civil engineering department was not yet established at that university, one examination was sent by fax and Sócrates's diploma was issued on a Sunday, a day on which the university was always closed.

Some Portuguese news media professionals stated that Sócrates or members of his staff, through phone calls, threatened court action against journalists and tried to stop the reportings on his licenciatura degree awarded by UnI. On 9 April 2007, Universidade Independente was closed by government officials after an investigation reported several serious irregularities in the running of this private university.

Under heavy pressure, Sócrates provided his version of the facts on Wednesday, 11 April 2007, in a live broadcast interview for the RTP 1 TV channel and RDP radio. The prime minister stated he was not favoured by the Universidade Independente to obtain the degree, declared he had been the target of "catty accusations", and defended the authenticity of the degree, though admitting he is not a fully chartered civil engineer. In his official biography at the Portuguese Government's official website, Sócrates claimed to have already obtained the qualification of engineer. He later admitted that this was a "lapse", and the government website altered his CV, downgrading "civil engineer" to "diploma in civil engineering". In the interest of accuracy, he should have used "licenciado em engenharia civil" instead of "engenheiro". Before he had been granted the degree, he presented himself as an "engineer" when he was solely a "technical engineer". Portuguese Parliament documents with official information on Sócrates personal data were found, proving such inconsistencies. Sócrates and his staff replied to this by stating that it was probably a misunderstanding in the parliamentary services. After having the licenciatura diploma he used the title "engineer" in several official documents, despite the fact that his unaccredited degree in civil engineering from Universidade Independente was not legally recognized to allow for the use of the title "engineer"; a profession which is regulated in Portugal by the Ordem dos Engenheiros.

José Sócrates was fiercely criticised by members of Portugal's democratic opposition in the Parliament regarding both proven and unproven issues related to this controversy. Nicolau Santos, a television journalist and a director of Expresso newspaper, criticised the controversial series of fait-divers published in Público and claimed that despite the extensive coverage of details, Público's investigation lead to "no definitive conclusion" and might be connected with other issues. In the same tone, several other media personalities, like SIC Notícias' journalist Ricardo Costa, also suggested controversially that SONAE corporation, the parent company of Público newspaper, was behind the beginning of the controversy due to a failed takeover bid of SONAE's telecommunications operator over the largest Portuguese telecom – Portugal Telecom. The complexity of the takeover bid involving the largest Portuguese telecom, prompted State intervention by the Autoridade da Concorrência (The Portuguese Competition Authority).

It was found that a close friend of Sócrates, Armando Vara, was also awarded a diploma by the Universidade Independente days before he was appointed to a high ranking banking administration position in the state-run Caixa Geral de Depósitos, which in turn was strictly opened to candidates holding at last one academic degree in any subject.

==== Investigation ====
State authorities investigated the affair and archived the file on the grounds that the suspicions of falsification and irregularities attributed to José Sócrates turned out to be formally impossible to prove. On the other hand, the Universidade Independente was investigated by education state authorities, which resulted in the compulsory closing of that private university in October 2007, due to lack of academic rigour and teaching quality, along with generalized managerial and financial chaos in the institution.

=== Magalhães computer ===
A low-cost Intel Classmate PC-based netbook for use by children, announced and sponsored by Sócrates's cabinet, named Magalhães (after Fernão de Magalhães), assembled by the Portuguese company J.P. Sá Couto, was at the centre of a controversy on 7 October 2008, when the company was suspected of €5 million worth of tax evasion. J.P. Sá Couto dismissed all the accusations of fiscal fraud within the company. Other major controversy regarding Magalhães computer were the legal issues about public contracting procedure in the agreement involving the Government and the company J.P. Sá Couto. The case led to an investigation that raised other similar issues involving other governmental agreements and public contracts.

=== Freeport outlet controversy ===
Since 2005, and, especially again in 2009, it was suggested by some Portuguese and British media that José Sócrates had waived environmental restrictions, following intervention by one of his uncles and a cousin, to grant the British company Freeport a licence to build the Alcochete mall, a gigantic emporium near the Tagus river, developed in part on protected land outside Lisbon in 2002, when he was Minister for Environment of the PM António Guterres' cabinet. Portuguese authorities have meanwhile insisted José Sócrates was not under investigation, nor was he a suspect, while UK's Serious Fraud Office refused to confirm the veracity of reports emanating in Portugal. José Sócrates also stated the Freeport project was in due compliance with all legal requirements at the time. Júlio Eduardo Coelho Monteiro, a businessman who is an uncle of José Sócrates, told the Portuguese newspaper Sol how he established contact between his nephew and Freeport's representatives.

In a DVD held by the British police and released in March 2009 by the Portuguese media, Charles Smith, a consultant hired to handle the licensing of the Freeport of Alcochete, clearly stated that José Sócrates "was corrupt" and that he received, through a cousin, money to give the green light to the project for the "outlet". The recording revealed by TVI is only part of a conversation of 20 minutes that, alongside Charles Smith, also included John Cabral, an official of the consultant, and Alan Perkins, director of Freeport. It was the latter who, without knowledge of the other two, has recorded the event, where Smith and Cabral were questioned about the money that left the company to be used for the payment of "gloves" to the current prime minister. Charles Smith is one of two defendants in the case Freeport, commercial space on the process of Freeport Alcochete, related to suspicion of corruption in the amendment to the Special Protection Area of the Tagus estuary (ZPET) decided three days before the elections of 2002, through a decree-law, when José Sócrates was Minister of Environment.

The conversation now revealed took place in 2006 with the aim of explaining the large outgoing amounts of money from the company's headquarters in London at the time of approval of the project. According to some sources contacted in London by TVI, José Sócrates remains the main suspect of British police. The British police are now set to send to the Portuguese authorities the 25 volumes of all research done in this process in England. The Serious Fraud Office, which investigates major financial fraud in Britain, has seen its activity limited due to the lack of cooperation of the Portuguese authorities in investigating the case. The first official meeting took place only on 17 November 2008 in The Hague, the headquarters of Eurojust, a body which is designed to facilitate judicial cooperation in the EU. Judge Cândida Almeida, director of DCIAP (Central Department for investigation and prosecution), which coordinates the department's prosecutor who investigates the case, refused a joint research proposal by the English. Then she became aware of the DVD. The prosecutor dropped the evidence, arguing that it did not comply with Portuguese law.

The Eurojust tried to distance itself from the scandal involving its head, José da Mota, a Portuguese, who allegedly put pressure on prosecutors in order to stop a corruption probe involving Portuguese Prime Minister José Sócrates. Two magistrates dealing with the so-called Freeport affair accused José Mota of having tried to persuade them to sideline the investigation at the request of the Portuguese premier and the minister of justice. The premier and Mr Mota's relationship goes back to the late nineties, when they worked in the same government as state secretaries for environment and justice, respectively. In 2002, when the new EU body was formed (Eurojust), Mr Mota was transferred to The Hague as Portugal's representative to Eurojust. He was elected head of the judicial co-operation body in 2007, at a time when the so-called Freeport case had already started in Portugal.

On 22 May 2012, Alan Perkins, a Freeport manager between 2005 and 2006, said, under oath in court, that illegal payments had been made to the minister of the Environment. At the time, the minister of the Environment was José Sócrates.

=== Face Oculta scandal ===
Another corruption case involving Sócrates was the Face Oculta scandal. On 28 October 2009, the police began investigating a business group headquartered in Ovar. Armando Vara, one of the suspects, was reported to have had "talks" with Sócrates. Sócrates denied any involvement, claiming that he was only talking to a friend.

In February 2011 the company TMN, that belongs to Portugal Telecom, claimed that, because of an informatics-related problem, all the information and data about the case and related to Armando Vara (ex-vice-president of BCP), Rui Pedro Soares (ex-manager of PT), Mário Lino (ex-minister) and Paulo Penedos (ex-assistant of PT) had disappeared. David Dinis, editor of the Diário de Notícias newspaper, quit his job because of pressure from the director, João Marcelino, to stop this information being spread by the press.

Sócrates was not indicted as part of the Face Oculta probe, but investigation of corruption charges continued under Operation Marquis.

=== Corruption investigation ===
In November 2014, José Sócrates was arrested on suspicions of corruption and money-laundering, having come to light that a close friend was holding millions of euros for his benefit. Sócrates claimed that he merely borrowed money from his friend, but there were no records of the amounts loaned, which admittedly funded a luxurious lifestyle in Paris after Sócrates left the government. This came to light during the government's Operation Marquis investigation. He was originally held pending the conclusion of this investigation. Sócrates was imprisoned in the jail at Évora until September 2015 when he was remanded to house arrest at a relative's house in Lisbon. He was freed from house arrest in October 2015, but was constrained to remain in Portugal and prohibited from contacting other suspects in the case, pending completion of the investigation. In 2017, Sócrates was formally indicted on corruption charges including bribery, money laundering and tax fraud.

The charges of document forgery, tax evasion, money laundering and misuse of political office were based upon three transactions:

- Sonae's takeover black knight bid for Portugal Telecom and the subsequent white knight takeover defence through a proposed merger with Brazilian telecom operator Oi involving Portugal Telecom's CEO Zeinal Bava,
- the Vale do Lobo expansion project, and
- the development of a high-speed railway line.

On 9 April 2021, a Portuguese judge dismissed the corruption charges against Sócrates, upholding lesser charges of money laundering and falsifying documents.

== Honours and awards ==
=== National honours ===
- Grand Cross of the Order of Prince Henry (21 April 2005)

=== International honours ===
Ribbon	Distinction	Country	Date	Ref.
	Order of the White Star, 1st Class	Estonia	20 February 2006	
	Grand Cordon of the Order of the Star of Jordan	Jordan	28 May 2009	
	Grand Cross of the Royal Norwegian Order of Merit	Norway	25 September 2009	
	Grand Cross of the Order of Merit	Chile	31 August 2010	
	Knight Grand Cross of the Order of St. Gregory the Great	Holy See	3 September 2010	
	Grand Cross of the Order pro Merito Melitensi	Malta	23 November 2010	
	Grand Cross of the Order of the Oak Crown	Luxembourg	6 December 2010	

== Electoral history ==
=== PS leadership election, 2004 ===
Ballot: 25 and 26 September 2004
Candidate	Votes	%
José Sócrates	28,984	79.5
Manuel Alegre	5,693	15.6
João Soares	1,505	4.1
Blank/Invalid ballots	271	0.7
Turnout	36,453	48.20
Source: Acção Socialista

=== Legislative election, 2005 ===
Ballot: 20 February 2005
Party	Candidate	Votes	%	Seats	+/−
PS	José Sócrates	2,588,312	45.0	121	+25
PSD	Pedro Santana Lopes	1,653,425	28.8	75	–30
CDU	Jerónimo de Sousa	433,369	7.5	14	+2
CDS–PP	Paulo Portas	416,415	7.3	12	–2
BE	Francisco Louçã	364,971	6.4	8	+5
Other parties		122,127	2.1	0	±0
Blank/Invalid ballots		169,052	2.9	–	–
Turnout		5,747,834	64.26	230	±0
Source: Comissão Nacional de Eleições

=== Legislative election, 2009 ===
Ballot: 27 September 2009
Party	Candidate	Votes	%	Seats	+/−
PS	José Sócrates	2,077,238	36.6	97	–24
PSD	Manuela Ferreira Leite	1,653,665	29.1	81	+6
CDS–PP	Paulo Portas	592,778	10.4	21	+9
BE	Francisco Louçã	557,306	9.8	16	+8
CDU	Jerónimo de Sousa	446,279	7.9	15	+1
Other parties		178,012	3.1	0	±0
Blank/Invalid ballots		175,980	3.1	–	–
Turnout		5,681,258	59.68	230	±0
Source: Comissão Nacional de Eleições

=== PS leadership election, 2011 ===
Ballot: 25 and 26 March 2011
Candidate	Votes	%
José Sócrates	26,713	93.3
Jacinto Serrão	954	3.3
Fonseca Ferreira	728	2.5
António Brotas	257	0.9
Blank/Invalid ballots	489	–
Turnout	29,141	89.95

=== Legislative election, 2011 ===
Ballot: 5 June 2011
Party	Candidate	Votes	%	Seats	+/−
PSD	Pedro Passos Coelho	2,159,181	38.7	108	+27
PS	José Sócrates	1,566,347	28.0	74	–23
CDS–PP	Paulo Portas	653,888	11.7	24	+3
CDU	Jerónimo de Sousa	441,147	7.9	16	+1
BE	Francisco Louçã	288,923	5.2	8	–8
PCTP/MRPP	Garcia Pereira	62,610	1.1	0	±0
PAN	Paulo Borges	57,995	1.0	0	new
Other parties		126,521	2.3	0	±0
Blank/Invalid ballots		228,017	4.1	–	–
Turnout		5,585,054	58.03	230	±0
Source: Comissão Nacional de Eleições

== References and notes ==
Party political offices
Preceded by Eduardo Ferro Rodrigues	Secretary-General of the Socialist Party; 2004–2011	Succeeded by António José Seguro
Political offices
Preceded by Elisa Ferreira	Minister of the Environment; 1999–2002	Succeeded by Arlindo Cunha
Preceded by Eduardo Ferro Rodrigues	Minister of Social Infrastructure; 2002	Succeeded by Luís Valente de Oliveira
Preceded by Pedro Santana Lopes	Prime Minister of Portugal; 2005–2011	Succeeded by Pedro Passos Coelho
Diplomatic posts
Preceded by Angela Merkel	President of the European Council; 2007	Succeeded by Janez Janša
