= Nuno Severiano Teixeira =

Portuguese politician (born 1957)

His Excellency Nuno Severiano Teixeira GCIH ComIH
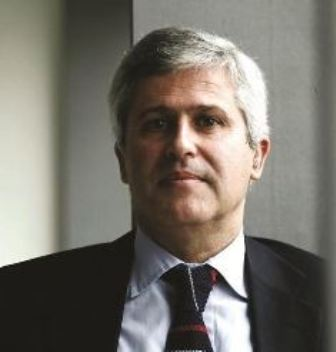

Member of the Council of State
- Incumbent
- Assumed office 17 April 2026
- President: António José Seguro

Minister of National Defense
- In office July 3, 2006 – October 26, 2009
- Prime Minister: José Sócrates
- Preceded by: Luís Amado
- Succeeded by: Augusto Santos Silva

Minister of Internal Administration
- In office 2000-09-14 – 2002-04-06
- Prime Minister: António Guterres

Personal details
- Born: November 5, 1957 (age 68) Guinea-Bissau
- Party: Socialist

Henrique Nuno Pires Severiano Teixeira (born November 5, 1957, in Portuguese Guinea) is a Portuguese academic and politician. Severiano Teixeira is a full professor at New University of Lisbon, and was also the vice rector of the same institution. He is director of the Portuguese Institute of International Relations (IPRI), an academic research institute that belongs to NOVA University of Lisbon. He is currently a visiting professor at Georgetown University.

Nuno Severiano Teixeira was Minister of Internal Administration in the 14th Constitutional Government, the second of the Prime Minister António Guterres. He was also Minister of Defense in the 17th Constitutional Government, the first of the Prime Minister José Sócrates.

Severiano Teixeira is the author of several publications in the fields of Military History, International Relations, Security and Defense, and European Integration.

== Background ==
Nuno Severiano Teixeira was born in Portuguese Guinea, in 1957, when his father was serving in military mission. He is a descendant of Colonel José Manuel Severiano Teixeira, who was awarded Commander of the Order of Avis, in 1989.

Nuno Severiano Teixeira was also awarded. He received the Grade of Commander of the Order of Prince Henry the Navigator, and also the Grand Cross of the Order of Prince Henry the Navigator.

The former Minister graduated in History in 1981, from the Faculty of Arts of the University of Lisbon, and holds a PhD in History of International Relations from the European University Institute, Florence, 1994. Nuno Severiano Teixeira has also the Habilitation degree in Political Science and International Affairs, from the New University of Lisbon.

Severiano Teixeira began teaching in the 1980s, as a professor at the School of Social Sciences of the University of Évora, between 1982 and 1994. He also taught at the History Department of the Institute of Labor Science and Enterprise in Lisbon (ISCTE-IUL), between 2002 and 2006, and at the Portuguese Catholic University, between 1998 and 2013. He is currently Professor in the Department of Political Studies at NOVA University of Lisbon.

As a visiting professor he taught at Georgetown University (2000), at the Institute of European Studies, University of California, Berkeley (2003-2004), and at the Robert Schuman Centre for Advanced Studies of the European University Institute, in Florence (2010).

Nuno Severiano Teixeira was Director of the National Defense Institute between 1996 and 2000.

== Duties in the Government of Portugal ==
- Minister of Internal Administration in the 14th Constitutional Government of Portugal (2000-2002).
- Minister of National Defense in the 17th Constitutional Government (2005 – 2009).

== Honours ==
=== National ===
- Grand Cross of the Order of Prince Henry (30 January 2006)
- Commander of the Order of Prince Henry (27 July 2000)

== Publications ==
- História Militar de Portugal, A Esfera dos Livros, Lisboa, 2017
- Heróis do Mar, História dos Símbolos Nacionais, A Esfera dos Livros Editora, Lisboa, 2015.
- História Contemporânea de Portugal, Volume 3, “A Crise do Liberalismo 1890-1930”, Fundação Mapfre, (Coordenação), Lisboa, 2014.
- The Europeanization of Portuguese Democracy, SSM - Columbia University Press, Nova Iorque, 2012, com António Costa Pinto (ed.).
- The International Politics of Democratization, Routledge Research in Comparative Politics, 2008.
- Portugal e a Integração Europeia, 1945–1986: a perspectiva dos actores, Lisboa: Temas e Debates, 2007, com António Costa Pinto (ed.).
- Os Militares e a Democracia, Edições Colibri, 2007, (Coordenação).
- Nova História Militar de Portugal, 5 Volumes, Círculo de Leitores, Lisboa, 2003-2004.
- Southern Europe and the Making of European Union, SSM, Columbia University Press, Nova Iorque, 2002, com António Costa Pinto (ed.)
- L'Entrée du Portugal dans la Grande Guerre, Objectifs Nationaux et Stratégies Politiques, Ed. Economica, Paris, 1998.
- Portugal e a Guerra: História das Intervenções Militares Portuguesas nos Grandes Conflitos Mundiais (Séculos XIX e XX), Edições Colibri, Lisboa, 1998.
- O Poder e a Guerra 1914-1918: Objetivos Nacionais e Estratégias Políticas na Entrada de Portugal na Grande Guerra, Editorial Estampa, Lisboa, 1996.
- O Ultimatum Inglês: Política Externa e Política Interna no Portugal de 1890, Publicações Alfa, Lisboa, 1990.
- A ordem Internacional: entre passado e futuro - Uma perspetiva histórica, NOVA, 2024.
- Portugal Multilateral: Dicionário, Almedina, NOVA, 2023
- What Role Should Southern Europe Play After the Pandemic and the War in Ukraine?, NOVA, 2022

Preceded by Luís Amado	Minister of Defence; 2006–2009	Succeeded by Augusto Santos Silva
