= Instituto Industrial e Comercial de Lisboa =

Instituto Industrial e Comercial de Lisboa (Portuguese for: Industrial and Commercial Institute of Lisbon) was a former Portuguese school of vocational education founded in 1852 as Instituto Industrial de Lisboa (Industrial Institute of Lisbon), by Minister Fontes Pereira de Melo decree of 30 December. Its aim was the creation of a technical school of vocational education, whose purpose was to facilitate the ongoing industrialization process set up by Pereira de Melo. The education of a large number of skilled industrial technicians in several areas, was one among many innovative reforms Pereira de Melo idealized as Minister. This qualified workers were suited to deal with the new needs in industry.

== The Instituto Industrial e Comercial de Lisboa ==
In 1869 the Instituto Industrial de Lisboa was renamed to Instituto Industrial e Comercial de Lisboa adding commerce studies to the school. Converted to a higher education school of engineering (since 1896) and commerce (since 1884) opened until 1910, which led to the creation of IST - Instituto Superior Técnico and Instituto Superior de Comércio in 1911, the Instituto Industrial e Comercial de Lisboa was extinguished with the end of Portuguese monarchy.

== 1911: Extinction. Birth of IST and ISEG university institutes ==
In 1911 it was split into two institutions of higher education: the Instituto Superior Técnico (engineering); and the Instituto Superior de Comércio (commerce/finance - today ISEG - Instituto Superior de Economia e Gestão of the Technical University of Lisbon), later, in 1930, combined with other higher education schools of Lisbon to create the Technical University of Lisbon composed by several faculties and university institutes.

== 1918: Re-birth of the Instituto Industrial de Lisboa ==
In 1918 a new Instituto Industrial de Lisboa was re-founded as an intermediate school, in order to train technicians for the industry in a number of engineering-related fields, which operated until 1974. Without higher education among its curricula, it conferred the professional title of Engenheiro Auxiliar (Auxiliary Engineer) since 1924 to 1926 and of Agente Técnico de Engenharia (Technical Agent of Engineering) between 1926 and 1974 as a vocational education school.

== 1974: Birth of ISEL ==
In 1974 it was converted into the Instituto Superior de Engenharia de Lisboa (ISEL), providing higher education, and becoming part of the Instituto Politécnico de Lisboa in the 1980s, a grouping of higher education polytechnic schools. It conferred the professional title of engenheiro técnico (technical engineer), a title conferred after a three-year course; the degree was known as bacharelato. In those times, a full chartered engineer (Engenheiro) in Portugal used to have a compulsory five-year course known as licenciatura which was granted exclusively by universities. Only engineers having the licenciatura diploma, graduated at the universities, were capacitated to develop any kind of project in engineering and were universally recognized by the Engineers Association of Portugal (Ordem dos Engenheiros).

Today, after many reforms and changes in higher education occurred since 1998 to the 2000s, the formal differences between polytechnic and university licenciatura degrees in engineering are in general null, and due to the Bologna process both graduates should be recognized equally all across Europe. However, there are many engineering courses whose degrees are still not recognized by the Ordem dos Engenheiros (the highest Portuguese authority in accreditation of professional engineers), especially those engineering courses conferred by several polytechnical institutes and many private institutions .

== See also ==
- Education in Portugal
- Higher Education in Portugal
