= Moderna University =

Private Portuguese university

Moderna University (Universidade Moderna) was a Portuguese private university headquartered in Lisbon, with departments in Setúbal, Porto and Beja. The institution was authorized by the Portuguese Ministry of Education to provide university higher education services in 1994 (Decree law: DL 313/94 de 23 de Setembro). It was shut down by the Portuguese Ministry for Science, Technology and Higher Education on 30 July 2008.

== 2007 investigations ==
In 2007, the university was on the brink of being closed by the Portuguese ministry responsible for higher education in Portugal, after reports of several irregularities arose during a state-managed investigation on private higher education in the country. It was closed in the summer of 2008 by lack of economic and financial capacity.

== See also ==
- Higher education in Portugal
- Independente University
