= Luis Miguel Pinho =

Portuguese academic

Luis Miguel Pinho is a Portuguese professor and researcher in the Computer Engineering Department of the Polytechnic of Porto - School of Engineering (ISEP), in Portugal. He was a member of the Research Center in Real-Time and Embedded Computing Systems, and is Executive Director of the Porto Research, Technology & Innovation Center.

== Education ==
He received a Licentiate (degree), a MEng and a PhD in electrical and computer engineering from the School of Engineering of the University of Porto (FEUP), Portugal in 1994, 1997 and 2001, respectively.

== Research ==
He has published more than 100 research works, mainly in the areas of real-time systems and the Ada programming language. Pinho has been actively involved with the Ada programming language, being awarded in 2012 the ACM SIGAda Robert Dewar Award for Outstanding Ada Community Contributions.

== Organisational affiliations ==
Luis Miguel Pinho is a Senior Member of the Association for Computing Machinery (ACM) and of the Institute of Electrical and Electronics Engineers (IEEE).

== Selected publications ==
- Maia, Cláudio, Luis Miguel Nogueira, and Luis Miguel Pinho. "Evaluating android os for embedded real-time systems." In 6th international workshop on operating systems platforms for embedded real-time applications, pp. 63–70. 2010.
- Pinho, Luis Miguel, and Francisco Vasques. "Reliable real-time communication in CAN networks." IEEE Transactions on Computers 52, no. 12 (2003): 1594-1607.
- Albano, Michele, Luis Lino Ferreira, Luís Miguel Pinho, and Abdel Rahman Alkhawaja. "Message-oriented middleware for smart grids." Computer Standards & Interfaces 38 (2015): 133-143.
- Maia, Cláudio, Marko Bertogna, Luís Nogueira, and Luis Miguel Pinho. "Response-time analysis of synchronous parallel tasks in multiprocessor systems." In Proceedings of the 22nd International Conference on Real-Time Networks and Systems, pp. 3–12. 2014.
