= Higher education in Portugal =

Higher education in Portugal is divided into two main subsystems: university and polytechnic education. It is provided in autonomous public and private universities, university institutes, polytechnic institutes and higher education institutions of other types.

The higher education institutions of Portugal grant licentiate, master's and doctoral academic degrees, with the last one being reserved to be granted only by the university institutions.

Higher education in state-run educational establishments is provided on a competitive basis, and a system of numerus clausus is enforced through a national database on student admissions. In addition, every higher education institution offers also ber of additional vacant places through other extraordinary admission processes for sportsmen, mature applicants (over 23 years old), international students, foreign students from the Lusosphere, degree owners from other institutions, students from other institutions (academic transfer), former students (readmission), and course change, which are subject to specific standards and regulations set by each institution or course department.

Portuguese universities have existed since 1290. The oldest such institution, the University of Coimbra, was first established in Lisbon before moving to Coimbra. Historically, within the scope of the now defunct Portuguese Empire, the Portuguese founded in 1792 the oldest engineering school of the Americas (the Real Academia de Artilharia, Fortificação e Desenho), as well as the oldest medical college of Asia (the Escola Médico-Cirúrgica de Goa) in 1842.

== Overview ==
In Portugal, the university system has a strong theoretical basis and is highly research-oriented while the polytechnical system provides a more practical training and is profession-oriented. Degrees in fields such as medicine, law, pharmaceutical sciences, natural sciences, economics, psychology or veterinary medicine are taught only in university institutions. Other fields like engineering, technology, management, education, agriculture, sports, or humanities are taught both in university and polytechnic institutions. Specifically vocationally oriented degrees such as, nursing, health care technician, accounting technician, preschool and primary school teaching, are only offered by the polytechnic institutions.

The oldest university is the University of Coimbra founded in 1290. The largest university, by number of enrolled students, is the University of Porto – with approximately 28,000 students. The Catholic University of Portugal, the oldest non-state-run university (concordatary status), was instituted by decree of the Holy See and has been recognized by the State of Portugal since 1971. A few polytechnical higher education institutions, though formed as such in the 1980s, have their origin in 19th century educational institutions – this is the case of the Instituto Superior de Engenharia de Lisboa, the Instituto Superior de Engenharia do Porto and the Escola Superior Agrária de Coimbra.

Public or private higher education institutions or courses cannot operate, or are not accredited, if they are not recognized by the Ministério da Ciência, Tecnologia e Ensino Superior (Ministry of Science, Technology and Higher Education). The two systems of higher education – university and polytechnic – are linked, and it is possible to transfer from one to the other through extraordinary effort. It is also possible to transfer from a private institution to a public one (or vice versa) on the same basis.

Many universities are usually organized by college (faculdade). Institute (instituto) and school (escola) are also common designations for autonomous units of Portuguese higher learning institutions, and are always used in the polytechnic system, though several universities also use these systems.

Access to public higher education institutions is subject to enrollment restrictions (numerus clausus), and students must compete for admission. Students who hold a diploma of secondary education (12th grade) or the equivalent, who meet all legal requirements, particularly exams in specific subjects in which minimum marks must be obtained, may apply. Any citizen over 23 years old who does not have the secondary education diploma (12th grade) can attempt to gain admission to a limited number of vacant places available, through special examination which includes an interview (Decree law: Decreto-Lei 64/2006, de 21 de Março). Public university's tuition fees are greater than polytechnics', and polytechnic weekend and evening classes are usually organized. For a large number of academic fields, undergraduate and graduate admission criteria and student evaluation in most public university institutions are usually more selective and demanding than in many private institutions or polytechnic institutions. Access to private higher education institutions is regulated by each institution.

After 2006, with the approval of new legislation on the frame of the Bologna Process, any polytechnic or university institution of Portugal is able to award a first cycle of study, known as licenciatura (licentiate) plus a second cycle which confers a mestrado (master's degree). Before then, only university institutions awarded master's degrees. All institutions award master's degrees after a second cycle of study, and some universities award integrated master's degrees (joint degrees) through a longer single cycle of study, with fields such as medicine having an initial 6-year study cycle needed for a master's degree. Doutoramentos (PhD degrees) are only awarded by university institutions. Only university institutions carry out fundamental research in addition to research and development. However, since after the Bologna Process (2006/2007) an increasingly large number of polytechnic institutions have established to some extent their own research and development units.

There are also special higher education institutions linked with the military and the police. These institutions generally have good reputations and are popular among students because their courses are a passport to the military/police career. These state-run institutions are the Air Force Academy, the Military Academy, the Naval School and the Instituto Superior de Ciências Policiais e Segurança Interna.

According to the OECD's Programme for International Student Assessment (PISA), the average Portuguese 15-year-old student was for many years underrated and underachieving in terms of reading literacy, mathematics and science knowledge in the OECD, nearly tied with the Italian and just above those from countries like Greece, Turkey and Mexico. However, since 2010, PISA results for Portuguese students improved dramatically. If this was true, it could be translated into a higher average level of readiness and academic skill among freshmen attending Portuguese universities and other higher education institutions. However, the Portuguese Ministry of Education announced a 2010 report published by its office for educational evaluation GAVE (Gabinete de Avaliação do Ministério da Educação) which criticized the results of PISA 2009 report and claimed that the average Portuguese teenage student had profound handicaps in terms of expression, communication and logic, as well as a low performance when asked to solve problems. They also claimed that those fallacies are not exclusive of Portugal but indeed occur in other countries due to the way PISA was designed.

== Situation ==
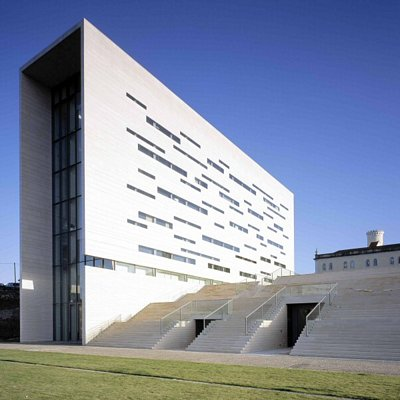
Headquarters of the New University of Lisbon

In Portugal, university and college attendance before the 1960s, including for the period of Portuguese monarchy which ended in 1910, and for most of the Estado Novo regime (1920s – 1974), was very limited to the tiny elites, like members of the bourgeoisie and high ranked political and military authorities. In addition, there were few institutions of higher education, low levels of secondary education attainment, and a high illiteracy rate for Western European standards. However, during the last decade of the Estado Novo regime, from the 1960s to the 1974 Carnation Revolution, secondary and university education experienced the fastest growth of Portuguese education's history. Today higher education, which includes polytechnic institutions and university institutions, is generalized but very heterogeneous, with different tonalities and subsystems. Overcrowded classrooms, obsolete curricula, unequal competition among institutions, frequent rule changing in the sector and increasingly higher tuition fees (inside the public higher education system, although much smaller than private institution fees) that can be a financial burden for many students, have been a reality until the present day, though some improvements have been made since the Bologna Process implementation in 2007/2008. The Bologna Process created a more uniform and homogeneous higher educational system, at least within the public university and polytechnic institutions. Nearly 40% of the higher education students do not finish their degrees, although an undisclosed number of those students are subsequently readmitted into other courses or institutions of their choice. Despite their problems, many good institutions have a long tradition of excellence in teaching and research, where students and professors can attain their highest academic ambitions.

Over 35% of college-age citizens (20 years old) attend one of the country's higher education institutions

== University and polytechnic ==
Portugal has two main systems of higher education:

- The university system, which is the oldest, has its origins in the 13th century. It is composed of thirteen public universities, one public university institute, a public open university, and several private universities and university institutes.
- The polytechnic system, that began offering higher education in the 1980s after the former industrial and commercial schools were converted into engineering and administration higher education schools (so its origins could be traced back to some earlier vocational education schools of the 19th century). It is composed of fifteen state-run polytechnic institutes, public and private non-integrated polytechnic institutions, and other similar institutions.

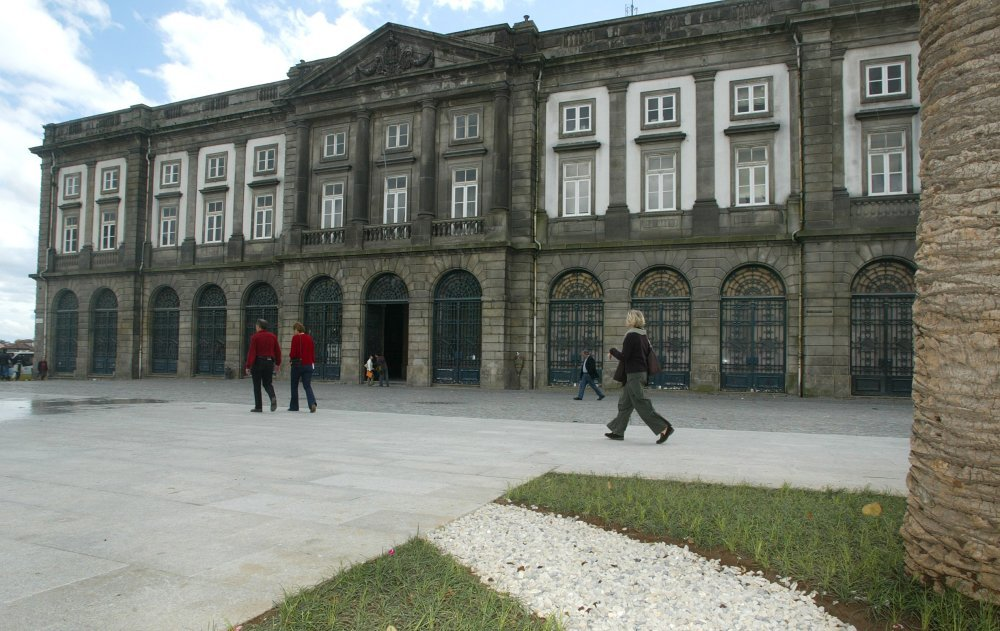
The Rector's office building of the University of Porto, the largest Portuguese university by number of students.

The state-run universities (Universidades) are governed by a Rector, and are groupings of faculties, and university institutes, departments or schools. They have been created mostly in the most populated and industrialized areas near the coast (although strategically balanced with three establishments opened after 1970 in the northern, central and southern interior regions), being established in the main cities. Two of these universities are located in the Azores and Madeira Islands, and the remaining eleven in Continental Portugal. Three of them are located in Lisbon, the capital of Portugal (four considering also the Lisbon University Institute ISCTE, a large public university institute). Public universities have full autonomy in the creation and delivery of degree programmes, which are to be registered at DGES – Direcção-Geral do Ensino Superior (State Agency for Higher Education). Universities are regulated by the Ministry of Science, Technology and Higher Education, and are represented as a whole by the CRUP – Conselho de Reitores das Universidades Portuguesas.

The state-run polytechnic institutes (Institutos Politécnicos) are governed by a President, and are groupings of superior schools (escolas superiores) and institutes, in major cities these also include superior institutes (institutos superiores). They have been created across the country after 1980. The fast expansion of the polytechnic institutes, whose entrance and teaching requirements before the mid-2000s were in general less demanding than the universities' criteria, was an administrative attempt to reduce the elevated rate of pre-higher education abandon and to increase the number of (under)graduates per one million inhabitants in Portugal which were dramatically below the European average (this does not imply that its students haven't become competent professionals). For the Portuguese State it was also considerably faster and cheaper to build the Institutos Politécnicos (Polytechnic Institutes) in almost all district capitals across the country, than build a few new universities – in average, state-funding per student is about 60% higher for university students than for polytechnic students; however, even university students' average funding per capita is about 60% lower in Portugal than in Scandinavia or North America. The number of doctorate-level teaching staff in the universities has been much larger than polytechnic's – only after the 2006 Bologna Process, polytechnics reached a 10% share of doctorate-level teachers, while universities had always been home to a teaching staff with over 40% of doctorates. Since the mid-2000s, after many reforms, upgrades and changes, including the Bologna process, the polytechnic institutes have become de facto technical universities with little formal difference between them and the classic full chartered universities (polytechnics can't award doctorate degrees and, in general, they are not true research institutions, with few exceptions). The creation of degree programmes by public polytechnics require their prior approval from Government, through DGES – Direccção Geral do Ensino Superior (State Agency for Higher Education). Polytechnics are regulated by the Ministry of Science, Technology and Higher Education, and are represented as a whole by the CCISP – Conselho Coordenador dos Institutos Superiores Politécnicos Portugueses.

The creation of private institutions and delivery of degree programmes by them, require prior approval from Government, through DGES – Direccção Geral do Ensino Superior, after assessment by experts teams, which are nominated by the Government.

This system has resulted in increasing manifestations of concern from polytechnic and, above all, private institutions, arguing against discretionary attitudes and unnecessary bureaucracy. Government replies defend the necessity of maintaining selective mechanisms to secure a minimum level of institution quality, rationalize the whole system, and protect educational standards. In the 1990s and 2000s, there was anyway a fast growth and proliferation of private higher education and state-run polytechnical institutions with lower educational standards and ambiguous academic integrity.

Admission to public university programmes are often more demanding and selective than to their equivalent in public polytechnic and private institutions. Many specific university institutions and degrees are also regarded as more prestigious and academically robust than their peers from the polytechnic system or from certain less notable university institutions.

=== History of the university subsector ===
The tower of the University of Coimbra, the oldest Portuguese university

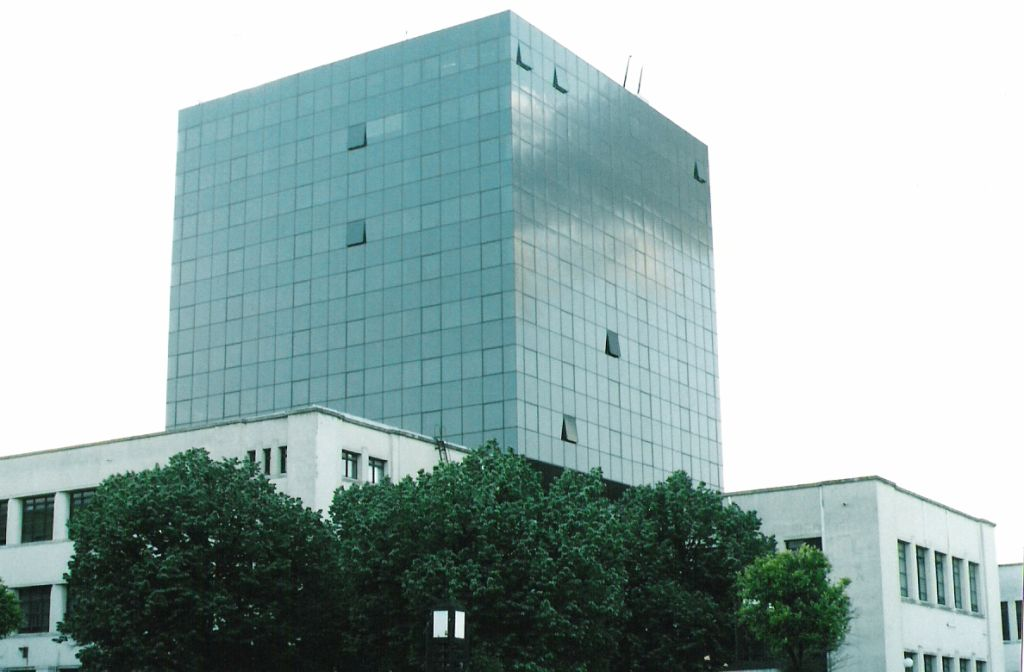
The North Tower of the Instituto Superior Técnico (IST) in Lisbon, the largest Portuguese engineering degree-conferring institution.

Public university schools have a long history in Portugal. They started in the Middle Ages, and like other European medieval universities at the time, they were founded by the monarchs under the authority and supervision of the Catholic Church. For many centuries there was only one university, the University of Coimbra, founded in 1290 in Lisbon. It was founded as a Studium Generale (Estudo Geral). Scientiae thesaurus mirabilis, the royal charter announcing the institution of the current University of Coimbra was dated 1 March of that year, although efforts had been made at least since 1288 to create this first university studies in Portugal. Throughout history it transferred between Coimbra and Lisbon several times, definitely settling in Coimbra during the 16th century (1537). The Colégio do Espírito Santo, a university college, was an old higher learning institution which operated between 1559 and 1759 in Évora, but it was shut down during the Marquis of Pombal government, because it was run by the Jesuits, and the marquis implemented strong secular policies. A new state-run university at Évora was founded in 1973 – the University of Évora. Within the scope of the Portuguese Empire, the Portuguese founded in 1792 the oldest engineering school of Latin America (the Real Academia de Artilharia, Fortificação e Desenho), as well as the oldest medical college of Asia (the Goa Medical College) in 1842.

Since the population was largely illiterate, the two universities at Coimbra and Évora, and some later higher-education schools in Lisbon (e.g. (Escola Politécnica: 1837-1911; Curso Superior de Letras: 1859-1911; and Curso Superior de Comércio: 1884–1911)) and Porto (successively Aula Náutica: 1762-1803; Real Academia da Marinha e Comércio: 1803-1837; and the Academia Politécnica: 1837–1911), were enough for a small population inside a territory like Continental Portugal of the 16th-19th centuries. During the 19th century some other isolated higher-education schools were established. For instance, two medical schools were established: the Lisbon Royal Medical-Surgical School and Porto Royal Medical-Surgical School opened in 1825. They were later incorporated into two new universities created in 1911 in Lisbon and Porto, which also absorbed Lisbon's former Escola Politécnica and Curso Superior de Letras, and Porto's Academia Politécnica, which were reformed and upgraded their facilities in the same year. Other successive institutions were the IST – Instituto Superior Técnico and the Instituto Superior de Comércio, successor of the former Curso Superior de Comércio, (today ISEG – Instituto Superior de Economia e Gestão), both born from the former Lisbon Institute of Industry and Commerce which originated the creation of university schools in 1911.

With the advent of the Republic, the University of Lisbon and the University of Porto were created in 1911. In 1930, a new university in Lisbon was created, the Technical University of Lisbon, which incorporated the Instituto Superior Técnico and some other university institutes and colleges such as the Instituto Superior de Comércio, and agriculture and veterinary schools.

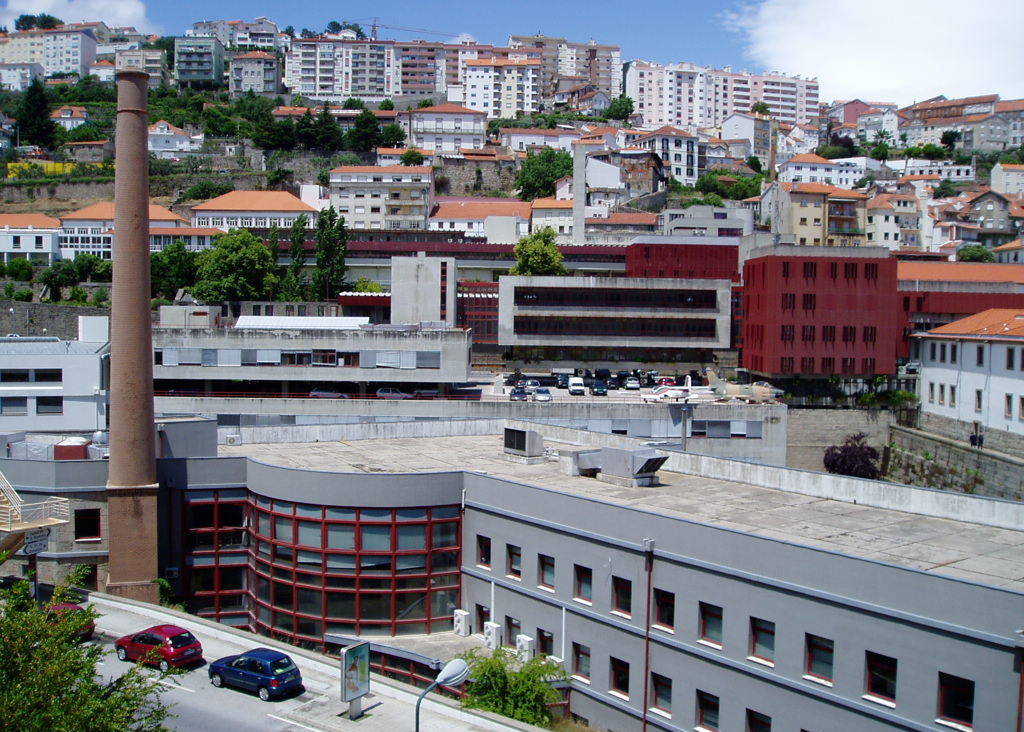
A view of the University of Beira Interior, in Covilhã

In 1972 the ISCTE, a public university institute, was created in Lisbon by the decree Decreto-Lei nº 522/72, of 15 December, as a first step towards a new and innovative public university in the city. Due to the Carnation Revolution of 1974 this first facility of a never-completed projected larger university stayed alone. In 1973 a new wave of state-run universities opened in Lisbon – the New University of Lisbon, Braga – the Minho University and Évora – the University of Évora. These last days of the Estado Novo régime were marked by the most significant growth in enrolments for both secondary and university education in Portugal. After 1974, the anti-Estado Novo revolution's year, new public universities were created in Vila Real – the University of Trás-os-Montes and Alto Douro, Aveiro – the University of Aveiro, Covilhã – the University of Beira Interior (upgraded from the former Polytechnic Institute of Covilhã which was created in 1973), Faro – the University of the Algarve, Madeira – the University of Madeira, and the Azores – the University of the Azores.

In 1988, the Portuguese government founded a public distance university, the Universidade Aberta (Aberta University), an "Open University" with headquarters in Lisbon, regional branches in Porto and Coimbra, and study centres all over the country.

In the 1980s and 1990s, a boom of private institutions was experienced and many private universities started to open. Most private universities had a poor reputation and were known for making it easy for students to enter and also to get high grades. In 2007, several of those private institutions or their heirs, were investigated and faced compulsory closure (for example, the infamous Independente University closing) or official criticism with recommendations that the state-managed investigation proposed for improving their quality and avoid termination.

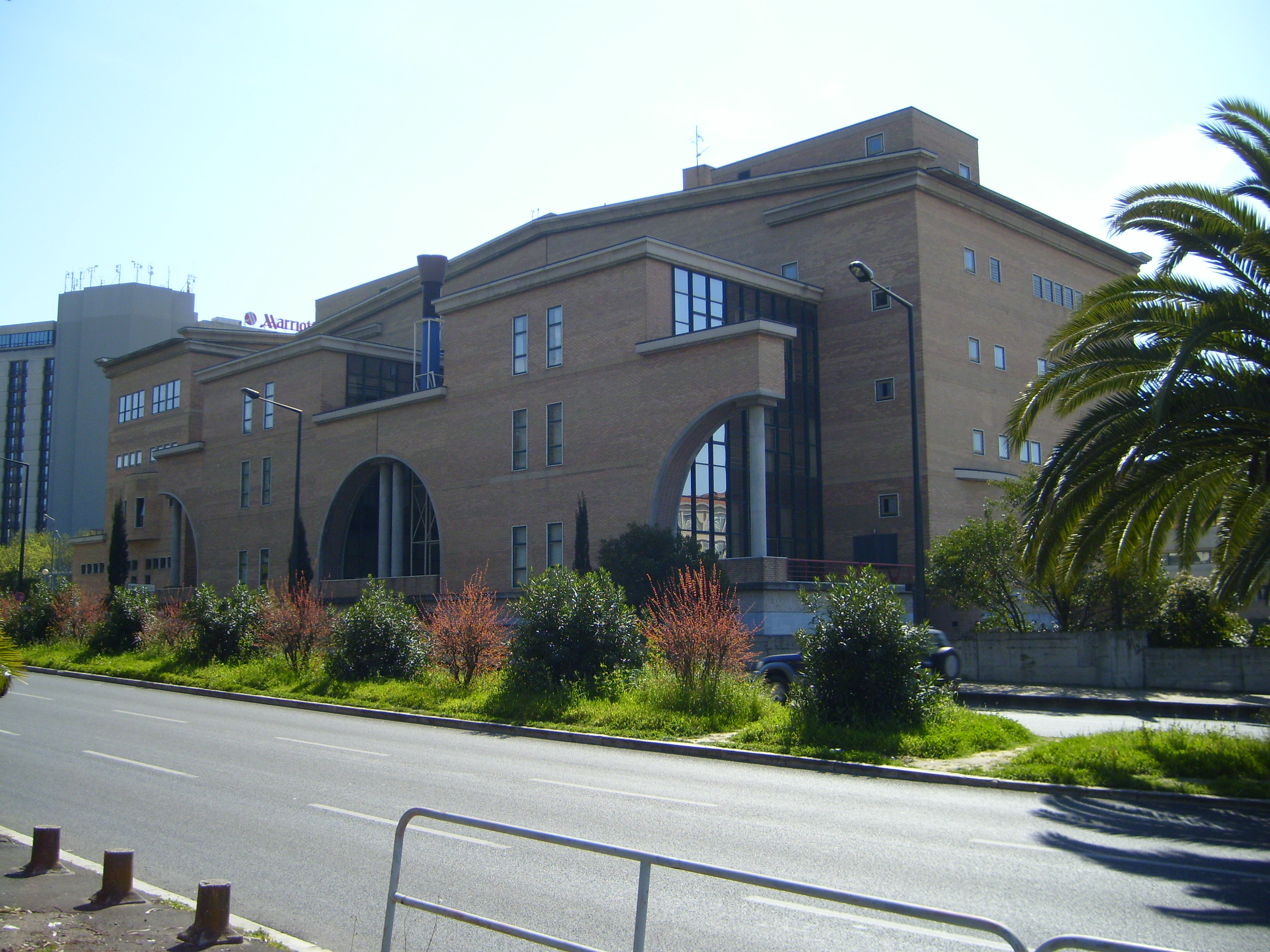
Catholic University of Portugal's business and economics faculty in Lisbon.

Without large endowments like those received, for example, by many US private universities and colleges which are attractive to the best researchers and students, the private higher education institutions of Portugal, with a few exceptions, do not have neither the financial support nor the academic profile to reach the highest teaching and research standards of the top Portuguese public universities. In addition, the private universities have faced a restrictive lack of collaboration with the major enterprises which, however, have developed fruitful relationships with many public higher education institutions.

Nowadays, the Catholic University of Portugal, a private university with branches in the cities of Lisbon, Porto, Braga, Viseu, and Figueira da Foz (founded before the others, in 1967, and officially recognized in 1971), offers some well-recognized degrees. This private university has a unique status, being run by the Catholic Church.

The Portuguese universities have been the exclusive granters of master's and doctoral degrees in the country and are to this day the major source of research and development in Portugal. Today, as in the past, they have full autonomy to offer all levels of academic degrees and the power to create new graduate or undergraduate courses in almost every major field of study. By the time of the implementation of the Bologna Process (2006) in Portuguese higher education, 42.5% of the state-run university teaching staff had a doctorate degree in 2005 – 65% in 2007 after the Bologna Process. (see list of universities in Portugal)

Due to the Portuguese sovereign debt crisis in the late 2000s, and the subsequent IMF-EU financial assistance to the Portuguese Republic from 2011 onward, many universities and other higher education institutions suffered financially. Many were on verge of bankruptcy and were forced to increase its admissions and tuition fees while the budget dwindled and staff members and bonuses were being reduced.

=== History of the polytechnic subsector ===
Portuguese learning institutions called "polytechnics" or "industrial and commercial institutes" were established in various periods with very different roles and objectives. They were designations for institutions ranging from university or polytechnic institutes to technical and vocational institutes.

- The Polytechnic Schools at Lisbon and Porto:

The 19th century – the industrialization er,– created the need for new education programs in the country, "industrial studies". In 1837, the Escola Politécnica (Polytechnic School) in Lisbon and the Academia Politécnica (Polytechnic Academy) in Porto were opened. They were university higher learning institutions conferring academic degrees, fully focused on the sciences, mathematics, and engineering. Apart from sharing the name, they were not related to the polytechnic subsystem which has existed in Portugal since the 1970s, or to any current institution belonging to it.

The label and legal statute of University had been reserved for exclusive use by the University of Coimbra, but with the Republican revolution in 1911, two new universities were founded. The Escola Politécnica and Academia Politécnica were the core from which the sciences and engineering faculties, respectively, of the new universities of Lisbon and Porto emerged.

- The Industrial Institutes at Lisbon and Porto:

The Prime Minister of the Kingdom, Fontes Pereira de Melo, was not satisfied with the excessive academism of both schools (Escola Politécnica (Polytechnic School) in Lisbon and the Academia Politécnica (Polytechnic Academy)), as he considered the institutions excessively theoretical for industrial labour force needs, as both were modelled on the only Portuguese university – the ancient University of Coimbra. Thus, in 1852, the minister created the Instituto Industrial de Lisboa (Lisbon Industrial Institute) which awarded higher education degrees between 1898 and 1911, and the Escola Industrial do Porto (Porto Industrial School), which a decade later was also declared an Institute and awarded higher education degrees between 1905 and 1918. The Instituto Industrial de Lisboa gave birth to the IST in 1911, which with other institutions formed the Technical University of Lisbon in 1930.

- The Industrial and Commercial Institutes and Schools:

The Industrial Superior Studies were cut in 1918 by the minister Azevedo Neves reforms, as the country suffered many social and political convulsions, and the creation in 1911 of the new universities in Lisbon and Porto covered the highest educational needs of the country at the time. Between 1918 and 1974 (until the approval of decree Decreto-Lei 830/74 of 31 December 1974), the Industrial and Commercial Institutes in Porto and Lisbon, plus new ones created in Coimbra (1965) and Aveiro, provided vocational and technical education, instead of higher education.

- Modern-day polytechnic sub sector development:

The idea of creating a polytechnic sector in Portugal can be traced back to the OECD's Mediterranean Regional Project, MRP, of 1959. This project aimed at assessing future needs for skilled labour in five Mediterranean countries (Italy, Greece, Spain, Yugoslavia and Portugal) and had a lasting impact in terms of the political and social perception of education, with significant effects on the educational structure of the participating countries. These changes included the expansion of the higher education network by creating new university-level institutions, while a binary system was initiated through the establishment of polytechnic institutes and several colleges of teacher training (Parliament Act 5/73 of 25 July). After 1974 the existing polytechnics were transformed into University Institutes under the allegation that they should not remain "second class" institutions. It was in this context that successive governments established contact with the World Bank and, from 1978 to 1984, about nineteen different missions visited Portugal. A final statement was based on two main principles:

- A basic emphasis on an economic approach to higher education to improve efficiency by attaining objectives at the lowest possible cost, e.g. containing long term university degrees while promoting shorter technical degrees, shorter teacher training degrees, higher student/staff ratios, etc.
- A perspective of a world division of labour that led defining country specific roles.

Although the final report welcomed the expansion of higher education, correcting the prior situation of unequal and limited access, the World Bank did not favour further expansion: "the enrolment represents 8% of the 18–22 age group and could be considered adequate. In view of the rapidly increased university enrolments, which represent an uneconomical drain in the economy...[the Bank recommends a] gradual introduction of quantitative restraints" (World Bank, 1977 Progress report). At the same time, the World Bank urged the Portuguese authorities to restrain enrolment quotas so as to make "better use" and rationalise the supply of higher education and improve the management of the system, namely in terms of accountability, coordination, and efficiency. Future expansions should be planned, taking into account manpower needs, and demographic and enrolment trends. Subsequently, the World Bank produced two "Staff Appraisal Reports", which provided insights about the negotiations between the Bank's Mission and the Portuguese government, and further confirmed the Bank's priorities. In the first Report of Assessment (No. 1807-PO, 1978), the Bank insisted on three criteria: balancing the supply of higher education graduates with the economic needs of the country, developing a persistent and consistent policy towards vocational education, and upgrading teacher training programs. The Bank suggested that Portugal needed not only to train high level technicians but also middle level personnel (on a yearly basis: 1400 technicians with short cycle post-secondary education, 500 agricultural technicians and 6000 middle-level managers). Subsequently, the government passed Decree-Law 397/77 of 17 September, which established a numerus clausus for every university programme and eliminated the threat to the new short vocational education programs – that without reducing the supply of engineering jobs, graduates of the technician training institutes would find employment too scarce. The World Bank was critical of the erratic policies toward the existing technical institutes, and of the excessive enrolment in university engineering programs and the lax approach on managing vacancy quotas, and raised the issue of diseconomies of scale in the system, suggesting that there were too many institutions with small dimensions. The government replied to the Bank's demands with Decree-Law 513-T/79, which established a network of polytechnic institutes, including Higher Schools of Education. The main objectives of Polytechnic education were: to provide education with an applied and technical emphasis and strong vocational orientation, and for training intermediate-level technicians for industries, service companies and educational units (first cycle of basic education).

During the 1970s and 1980s, a network of polytechnic institutes replaced short-cycle technical training with polytechnic higher education. This network include the Higher Schools of Education (Escolas Superiores de Educação) They were opened in many cities as confederations of Escolas Superiores and Institutos Superiores providing short-cycle bacharelato degrees (in education, music, engineering, management, agriculture, and other areas), many of which lacked a solid and realistic strategy. Between 1979 and 1986, a few were almost immediately upgraded to create new universities, like the University of Trás-os-Montes and Alto Douro, the University of Beira Interior, or the University of the Algarve. Some of those first polytechnics were transformed into University Institutes so that they would not remain "second class" institutions, and a few years later were upgraded to full chartered universities. The polytechnic institutes, heirs of a large network of reputable but discontinued intermediate schools with traditions in technical and vocational education, which also incorporated other older institutions formerly known as industrial institutes (see Instituto Industrial de Lisboa, Instituto Superior de Engenharia de Lisboa and Instituto Superior de Engenharia do Porto), were originally created to produce skilled intermediate technicians in specific areas. The short-cycle polytechnical degrees were mainly aimed at training of intermediate technicians for industry and commerce but also for basic health and education, instead of academics (like biologists, chemists, economists, geographers, historians, lawyers, mathematicians, philosophers, physicians, physicists, et al.), engineers, lecturers, researchers and scientists that were already produced by Portuguese universities. In 1974, the Industrial and Commercial Institutes of vocational education were transformed into higher learning Superior Institutes of Engineering and Accounting and Administration and initially integrated in the university subsector; although originally exclusively focused on providing short-cycle degrees, the need for a stronger polytechnic sector, and these schools' history and purpose, led them to be integrated in the polytechnic subsector in the late 1980s (Administrative Rule 389/88 of 25 October 1988 – Decreto-Lei n.º 389/88, de 25 de Outubro). However, in the following decades the polytechnic institutions didn't assume their specific role as tertiary education vocational schools, which were created to award practical diplomas in more technical or basic fields. Non-university intermediate professionals and skilled workers for the industry, agriculture, commerce and other services where needed. As more new public university institutions were founded or expanded, polytechnics didn't feel comfortable with their subaltern status in the Portuguese higher education system and a desire to be upgraded into university-like institutions grew among the polytechnic institutions' administrations. This desire of emancipation and evolution from polytechnic status to university status, was not followed by better qualified teaching staff, better facilities for teaching or researching, or by a stronger curricula with a more selective admission criteria, comparable with those enforced by almost all public university institutions. Criteria ambiguity and the general lower standards in polytechnic higher education and admission, were fiercely criticised by education personalities like university rectors, regarding issues like the lack of admission exams in mathematics for polytechnic engineering applicants, and the proliferation of administration and management courses everywhere, many without a proper curriculum in mathematics, statistics and economics-related disciplines.

After its creation in the late 1970s, polytechnic institutions used to offer a 3-year course (the engineering superior institutes created in 1974, awarded 4-year bacharelato degrees before have been integrated into the polytechnic sector in 1988), awarding a bacharelato degree (lower than a bachelor's degree) instead of a university licenciatura (licentiate) degree which was four to six years. The Portuguese licenciatura was a longer undergraduate degree, which included a licensure for working in a particular profession and an accreditation by the respective professional orders – ordens profissionais. The licenciatura diploma was also required for those applicants who wished to undertake masters and doctorate programs.

The publication of Administrative Rule 645/88 of 21 September 1988 authorised polytechnic schools to teach two-year courses of specialised higher education (CESE – Curso de Estudos Superiores Especializados) within the fields already taught at the school. This system guaranteed a prominent independence between the two levels (bachelor's and CESE) since it was not compulsory to maintain a coherence of subjects. The diploma of specialised higher education (DESE – Diploma de Estudos Superiores Especializados) thus emerged much more as a post-graduate diploma than a complementary education to the bachelor student who wanted a licentiate degree. Changing the structure of the CESE into two-stage degrees obtained in two levels known as licenciatura bietápica (bachelor's and licentiate, in which access to the second level is granted immediately after completing the first), as consigned in Administrative Rule 413A/98 of 17 July 1998, removed the formal differences between the university licenciatura and the new two-stage polytechnic licenciatura (licenciatura bietápica).

By the government decree of July 1998 the polytechnics started to offer a two-stage curriculum (the first three years conferring a bacharelato degree, the following two years a licenciatura bietápica degree); both are undergraduate degrees, but the universities were offering a single licentiate degree (licenciatura) of four to five years. This was changed with the Bologna process with a new system of three years for a bachelor's degree (licenciatura). Two additional years grant a master's degree (mestrado) which is conferred by the polytechnic institute under protocols with a partner university or alone when the polytechnic institution is in full compliance with the necessary requirements (proper research activity, doctoral teaching staff, and budget). The doctoral degree (doutoramento) is conferred only by the universities, as it always has been. By the time of the implementation of the Bologna Process (2006) in Portuguese higher education, 9.5% of the state-run polytechnic teaching staff had a doctorate degree in 2005 – 15% in 2007 after the Bologna Process.

The Lisbon Superior Institute of Engineering (ISEL, one of the colleges resulting from the former Lisbon Institute of Industry, today part of the Polytechnical Institute of Lisbon), with the support of the University of Lisbon (UL), approved in 2005 the express will to reintegrate the university subsector as part of the University of Lisbon which do not have a Faculty of Engineering and through the assimilation and reorganization of ISEL could transform that polytechnic engineering school to a new university engineering school inside UL. For ISEL itself, this change could represent an emancipation from the limited polytechnic system, which has been regarded as a minor higher education subsystem in Portugal (although by the mid-2000s with many upgrades and the Bologna process, the formal differences are less notorious), due to limitations that were imposed by State Education Laws on polytechnics (such as the professor's career, the professor's wages, the State funds spending and the teaching competences of the polytechnics). The Porto Superior Institute of Engineering (ISEP) was never merged into the University of Porto (or one of its predecessor schools, the Polytechnic Academy). The original proposal was dropped, partially because the University of Porto has owned its own engineering school since 1911 – the Faculdade de Engenharia da Universidade do Porto, known as Faculdade de Engenharia since 1926, unlike the University of Lisbon.

Nursing and health technologies technicians (technicians in clinical analysis, radiology, audiology, nuclear medicine and other technical fields in health) are also polytechnic higher education courses offered by nursing schools and schools of health technologies which are grouped into polytechnic institutes, and, in some cases, into universities (remaining in each of those situations as autonomous schools belonging to the polytechnic subsector). The nursing schools were legally defined as comparable to polytechnic institutions in 1988 (Administrative Rule 480/88 of 23 December 1988 – Decreto Lei n.º 480/88, de 23 de Dezembro), and started to provide higher education degrees in nursing in 1990 (Rule 821/89 of 15 September 1990 – Portaria n.º 821/89, de 15 de Setembro). Before 1990 nursing schools were not academic-degree-conferring institutions, and did not belong to the higher educational system. In 1995 they were fully integrated into the polytechnic subsystem (Administrative Rule 205/95 of 5 August 1995 – Decreto Lei n.º 205/95, de 5 de Agosto), and in 1999 the new courses in nursing were approved, conferring a licenciatura diploma (Administrative Rule 353/99 of 8 September 1999 – Decreto Lei n.º 353/99, de 8 de Setembro).

Between 1918 and 1974, some older schools that are today integrated into the polytechnic subsector were industrial and commercial schools of vocational education, as well as intermediate schools for primary-education-teacher training, schools of agriculture, or nursing schools. Current establishments for polytechnic studies in engineering such as the Instituto Superior de Engenharia de Lisboa, Instituto Superior de Engenharia do Porto, Instituto Superior de Engenharia de Coimbra, the nursing schools, and the current polytechnic schools of education (Escolas Superiores de Educação) during that period had no relation with higher education, and were known by other names. Admission to these schools was open to people with no complete secondary education, with universities reserved for secondary school graduates. For decades, these vocational schools of intermediate education (known as ensino médio) did not have the higher education status or credentials they have now. However, the majority of current polytechnical institutes was fully created in the 1980s and 1990s. It must be remembered that the Instituto Superior de Engenharia de Lisboa and the Instituto Superior de Engenharia do Porto, both born from the earlier industrial institutes (Instituto Industrial), were higher education degree-conferring institutions in engineering during a short period before 1919, and were known by other institutional names in their long histories.

However, in the 1990s and 2000s, a fast growth and proliferation of and state-run polytechnical institutions with lower educational standards and ambiguous academic integrity, was responsible for unnecessary and uneconomic allocation of resources with no adequate quality output in terms of both new highly qualified graduates and research. While across the world polytechnics have transformed themselves into full universities, in Portugal, with the lowest higher education levels in Europe, continues to segregate the sectors based on the world bank model of the 1950s and 1960s.

- Metamorphoses of current and Former polytechnic institutes:

During the 1980s, the former Polytechnic Institute of Faro, in the Algarve region, southern Portugal, was incorporated into the University of the Algarve, but as a totally independent institution in terms of staff, curricula and competences, remaining a full public polytechnic institution within a larger and independent public university but completely separated (economies of differentiation maybe?). The former and short-lived Polytechnic Institute of Vila Real, in northern Portugal, was closed and then reformed, having been reorganized into a university in the 1980s – the University of Trás-os-Montes e Alto Douro. The University of Beira Interior in Covilhã was founded in 1979 after the closing of a former (also short-lived) polytechnic institute – the PIC – Polytechnic Institute of Covilhã (Instituto Politécnico da Covilhã) (1973–1979). A remarkable level of achievements and a successful political lobbying, allowed PIC in 1979 to be promoted by the Portuguese Ministry of Education to a higher institutional level, university institute. Seven years later, in 1986, the University Institute of Beira Interior was granted full university status, becoming the current University of Beira Interior.

== Socio-economic composition of students ==
Based on a research study (Preferências dos estudantes, co-authored by Diana Amado Tavares, from CIPS – Centro de Investigação de Políticas do Ensino Superior (Centre For Research in Higher Education Policies), among others), the Portuguese newspaper Diário de Notícias reported on 2 April 2007, that according to the study, pre-higher education students from families with a higher educational and cultural background have a 10 times higher probability of becoming higher education students than the others. And among all higher education students, the family economic and cultural background are decisive on the type of course a student can attain in the higher education system. According to the study, using as an example medicine, it shows that 73,2% of the 2003/2004 medicine freshman admitted to Portuguese universities have graduated parents. On the other side, 73% of nursing and health technician students (polytechnic courses), have parents without higher education.

The study shows a relation between parental very low educational levels and the students' options in higher education, where 39% of basic education teacher students, and 20% of management students, have parents with 4 years of study or less, the 4th grade (4ª classe). On the other side, law, natural sciences and related fields (particularly medicine), and fine arts, are preferred courses of students from families with higher educational and cultural backgrounds.

Another study made by the University of Lisbon for its own students in the period 2003–2008, concluded that popular selective courses with restricted numerus clausus and demanding high grades to the new applicants (examples include the university degrees of medicine, fine arts, and pharmacy), are mainly attained by students arrived from a wealthier background than that of those students enrolled at unpopular and less selective degree programmes and departments.

== Degree significance and accreditation ==
=== Degrees ===
Schools that adhered to the Bologna process (since 2006–2007) maintained the degree names but their significance changed. In ascending order of importance:

Bacharelato The Portuguese bacharelato degree awarded by polytechnic institutions or its predecessors, was a Bachelor degree (but not an honours degree, only the then licenciatura degree was equal to an honours degree) – title: Bacharel or Engenheiro Técnico for engineering technologists – abbreviation: none or Bach.

- Non-Bologna: three or four-year course in a polytechnic (before 2007)
- Bologna: no longer used.

Licenciatura (Academic License) – title: Licenciado (popular: Dr or Engenheiro for a License in engineering) – abbreviation used in front of holder's name: Lic. (popular: Dr. or Eng. for Engineer, used extensively (formal and colloquially))

- Non-Bologna: licenciatura was an honors degree with four- to six-year course in a university, or a Bacharelato complemented with one or two extra years in a polytechnic (called licenciatura bietápica, meaning dual-stage license) or university (before 2007)
- Bologna: three-year course in a university or polytechnic. Lincenciatura is now an ordinary degree and no longer an honours degree.

Pós-Graduação or Especialização (Postgraduate degree) – no specific title

- Usually one year of specific study for holders of a Licenciatura or Mestrado.

Mestrado (Master's degree) – title: Mestre

- Non-Bologna: advanced degree in a specific scientific field, indicating capacity for conducting practical research. Courses last two to four semesters, including lectures and the preparation and discussion of an original dissertation. It is only open to those who have obtained a grade average of 14/20 or higher in the Licenciatura course. Those with less than 14/20 may also be eligible for a Mestrado course after analysis of the curriculum by the university.
- Bologna: Licenciatura complemented with one or two extra years in a polytechnic or university; or, in some cases, a 5- to 6-year joint degree (Mestrado Integrado) in a university. Students have to present their public thesis defense in order to be awarded the degree.

Doutorado (Doctorate) – used in front of holder's name: Doutor

- The Doutorado is conferred by universities to those who have passed the Doctorate examinations and have defended a thesis, usually to pursue a teaching and researching career at university level. There is no fixed period to prepare for the Doctorate examinations. Candidates must hold a degree of Mestrado or Licenciatura (or a legally equivalent qualification) and have competences and merit that are recognized by the university.

Agregação (Agrégation) – used in front of holder's name: Professor Doutor

- This is the highest qualification reserved to holders of the Doutor degree. It requires the capacity to undertake high level research and special pedagogical competence in a specific field. It is awarded after passing specific examinations.

=== Accreditation ===
The Agência de Avaliação e Acreditação do Ensino Superior (Higher Education Accreditation and Evaluation Agency) was created in the late 2000s and started to work in the early 2010s. In 2012, its first thorough accreditation and evaluation report concluded that 25% (or 107) of 420 (out of 3500) bachelor's, master's and doctorate degree programs offered in Portugal, did not comply with elemental quality and academic integrity standards and should be terminated. Besides the state-run accreditation agency, many professional associations of some of the regulated professions have run their own accreditation systems – they are known as Ordens (these include several Ordens, some much larger, reputed and older than others, like the Ordem dos Engenheiros; Ordem dos Advogados; Ordem dos Farmacêuticos; Ordem dos Enfermeiros; Ordem dos Arquitectos; Ordem dos Médicos; Ordem dos Biólogos; Ordem dos Economistas; Ordem dos Revisores Oficiais de Contas; etc.). In general, registration with such associations is a requisite for the legal practice of the profession and it normally requires an admission examination. In some orders (e.g. Ordem dos Engenheiros for the exercise of engineering profession), the accreditation process exemptes candidates, possessing an accredited degree, of such examination. But some orders, as well as some other professional associations, only allow candidates possessing an accredited course to be admitted to examination but do not exempt them from this examination due to the large number of institutions offering degrees in the concerned field with very different teaching standards and curricula (e.g. Ordem dos Advogados for lawyers and the Ordem dos Técnicos Oficiais de Contas for accountants).

==== History ====
During many years (at least during most of the 20th century to the 2000s), a graduate in Portugal used to have a compulsory 4 to 5-year course (an exception included medicine, with a 6 years course) known as licenciatura which was granted exclusively by universities. Only graduates having the licenciatura diploma exclusively conferred by the universities were fully able to develop professional activity in their respective field (like engineering, or secondary school teaching) and were universally recognized and regulated by its Ordem (the highest professional association authority) and/or the State. Other higher education courses offering a 3-year bacharelato degree that the newly created polytechnic institutes started to award in the 1970s and 1980s, like the technical engineering courses, the accounting technician courses, or the basic education teaching courses, had its own regulation scheme and were not recognized by the respective Ordens Profissionais in the field or by the State to perform the same professional activities university's licenciados were habilitated for (for instance, technical engineers did not belong to the Ordem of engineers and were awarded a limited range of engineering projects, and most teachers with the polytechnic degrees were not able to teach school students after the 6th grade). In 1999, over 15,000 students enrolled in Portuguese higher learning institutions and newly graduates in the fields of engineering and architecture, were enrolled or were awarded a degree in a non-accredited course. Those students and graduates with no official recognition were not admitted to any Ordem and were unable to sign projects in their presumed field of expertise. At the same time, only one accredited engineering course was offered by a private university, and over 90% of the accredited courses with recognition in the fields of engineering, architecture, and law were provided by state-run universities. The Agência de Avaliação e Acreditação do Ensino Superior (A3ES) (Higher Education Accreditation and Evaluation Agency) was created in the late 2000s and started to work in the early 2010s. In 2012, its first thorough accreditation and evaluation report to date concluded that 25% (or 107) of 420 (out of 3500) bachelor's, master's and doctorate degree programs offered in Portugal, did not comply with elemental quality and academic integrity standards and should be terminated. In the 1990s, the offer of many new degrees in Portugal became widespread across the entire country through both public and private university and polytechnic institutions. By 2010, lower selectiviness and academic integrity levels, including in some schools previously known for its reputation and prestige, debased the average teaching level in Portugal according to the head of the Portuguese Bar Association (Ordem dos Advogados) Marinho Pinto.

==== Today's situation ====
Currently, after many major reforms and changes in higher education started in 1998 which originated a process that spans across the 2000s, the formal differences between polytechnic and university licenciatura degrees are in general null and they have an equivalent denomination and course duration, and due to the Bologna process both graduates should be recognized equally all across Europe. Among the oldest recognized and most extensively accredited courses in Portugal, are those university degrees awarded by the state-run universities. After the large 1998 – 2000s reforms and upgrades, many polytechnic licenciatura degrees started to be offered by the largest state-run polytechnic institutes, like those in the cities of Lisbon and Porto, have been awarded in the same way with wide official recognition by the concerned Ordens Profissionais and the State.

== Admission ==
Admission to higher education level studies requires either a secondary school credential, Diploma de Ensino Secundário, given after twelve study years, allowing the student to be examined through the Provas de ingresso (admission exams), or an extraordinary exam process available to anyone aged 23 or older.

Every higher education institution has also a number of other extraordinary admission processes for sportsmen, international students, foreign students from the Lusosphere, degree owners from other institutions, students from other institutions (academic transfer), former students (readmission), which are subject to specific standards and regulations set by each institution or course department.

=== With secondary school credential ===
Students must have studied the subjects for which they are entering to be prepared for the entrance exams, but they are not required to have previously specialised in any specific area at the secondary school. Students sit for one or more entrance exams, Concurso nacional for public institutions or Concurso institucional for private institutions. In addition to passing entrance exams, students must fulfill particular prerequisites for some courses.

Enrollment is limited; each year the institution establishes the number of places available (numerus clausus). The exam scores count for the final evaluation, which includes the secondary school average marks. Then the students have to choose six institutions/courses they prefer to attend, in preferential order. The ones who reach the marks needed to attend the desired institution/course, given the number of vacancies, will be admitted. This means that the students could not be admitted at its first or second choice, but be admitted at the third or even sixth choice. In some cases, those entering polytechnic institutes with previous vocational training will receive institutional preference.

=== Admissions table ===
Portuguese ordinary admissions are based in a competitive system of numerus clausus, different programmes have different exams needed for admission which may vary from one institution to another.

==== 2008 admissions ====
2008 table of new alumni by institution in state-run universities and polytechnics, excluding international students and extraordinary admissions.

Institution	Initial vacancies	New alumni	Percentage
University of Lisbon	6835	6280	91.9%
University of Porto	4025	4008	99.6%
Polytechnic Institute of Lisbon	2268	2220	97.9%
University of Minho	2392	2326	97.2%
Porto Polytechnic Institute	2874	2785	96.9%
New University of Lisbon	2575	2494	96.9%
University of Trás-os-Montes and Alto Douro	1337	1286	96.2%
University of Madeira	585	557	95.2%
Polytechnic Institute of Coimbra	1800	1711	95.1%
University of Coimbra	3102	2935	94.6%
University of Aveiro	2039	1910	93.7%
University of Beira Interior	1270	1167	91.9%
University of Évora	1035	927	89.6%
University of the Azores	653	564	86.4%
University of the Algarve	1755	1506	85.8%
Polytechnic Institute of Viana do Castelo	876	747	85.3%
Polytechnic Institute of Cávado and Ave	612	521	85.1%
Polytechnic Institute of Leiria	2040	1733	85.0%
Polytechnic Institute of Setúbal	1406	1119	79.6%
Polytechnic Institute of Viseu	1517	1093	72.1%
Polytechnic Institute of Castelo Branco	972	676	69.5%
Polytechnic Institute of Santarém	1044	689	66.0%
Polytechnic Institute of Beja	655	431	65.8%
Polytechnic Institute of Bragança	1743	1047	60.1%
Polytechnic Institute of Portalegre	835	481	57.6%
Polytechnic Institute of Tomar	750	405	54.0%
Polytechnic Institute of Guarda	799	382	47.8%

=== Extraordinary exam process ===
After the approval of decree law Decreto-Lei 64/2006, de 21 de Março in 2006, even without a complete secondary school education, anyone 23 or older can apply to state-run higher learning institution through the Exame Extraordinário de Avaliação de Capacidade para Acesso ao Ensino Superior (extraordinary exam to assess the capacity to enter higher-level studies), also called the Ad-Hoc exam. Over 23 years old applicants are considered mature applicants and may be admitted without meeting the ENES examination requirement. In these cases, application is considered on the basis of one's educational background and work and life experience will be fully taken into account, as well as an interview. The process consists of the general Portuguese exam, an interview to evaluate motivation and CV, and additional written and/or oral exams specific to each school and course. Candidates approved go through a separate numerus clausus or enroll directly at the discretion of the school's board. As what happens with the Concurso Nacional through the Exames Nacionais do Ensino Secundário (ENES), the Extraordinary Exam Process for over-23 years old candidates is more demanding and has a much higher selectiveness in public universities than in the public polytechnics. Humanities and other non-mathematical-intensive fields have also much higher admission rates than classical university engineerings, economics or medicine. This implies that almost all new students admitted by this extraordinary process enter a polytechnic institution, private institution, or humanities programmes.

=== Inequalities ===
Most public university courses often demand much higher admission marks than most similar courses at the polytechnic institutes or private institutions. This has been a major statistical fact among the higher education subsystems in Portugal. However, it is not possible today to characterize precisely a course's quality level by its higher education subsystem (polytechnic or university) because some polytechnic courses demand high grades and have a better reputation and popularity than in the past, after many years of reforms and reorganization in the polytechnic subsystem. But in general, the majority of the most highly regarded degrees, noted for their selectiveness and popularity, are provided by some institutions of the university system, with many of the polytechnic system's institutions being often regarded as a second choice alternative to the major universities for a number of students. There was a historic connotation that polytechnic institutes were often considered the schools of last resort, because of their general low selectiveness (which was clearly substandard from the 1980s to the mid-2000s), lack of historical notability, and diminute number of highly distinguished alumni and professors, which some feel hurts their reputation. In parallel with the Bologna reform, two major regulatory initiatives have been implemented from the academic year 2005/06, namely: access rules have enforced minimum grades of 95/200 in the national access examinations for all candidates in every sector of higher education; and a minimum number of 10 students per degree programme has been required for public funding, with this limit to increase to 20 students in 2006/07. The measures provoked great alarm and concern among the polytechnic institutions who criticised the more rigorous requirements as "bad and elitist". However, specific field entrance exams that are required for admission to many institutions are notorious for their inconsistencies, with courses which for instance may traditionally require mathematics, physics or chemistry entrance exams, allowing non-related entrance exams to catch a large number of underachieving applicants who otherwise would not be admitted, and do not have a place at more selective institutions in the same field. For the other side, higher grades inside the higher education institutions were more frequent for those students of private, public polytechnic and some public university courses that were globally the worst pre-higher education applicants. This implied a long-lasting reputation of lower teaching standards and easier entrance requirements in many public polytechnic and private institutions, as well as in some public university departments, which seemed rather relaxed. A number of scandals, suspicions and affairs involving private higher education institutions (for example, major private universities like Universidade Moderna (1998), Universidade Independente (2007) and Universidade Internacional (2007), among others), and a general perception of many of those institutions as having a tendentially relaxed teaching style with less rigorous criteria, have contributed to their poor reputation which originated a state-run inspection of private higher education institutions in 2007. Many institutions did not provide degree programs of academic integrity comparable to those of traditional universities. Like in any other country in the world, this appears to be an injustice for thousands of others students admitted to more rigorous and selective institutions that will face the same competition in the labour market, where the graduation marks are often decisive. This has allowed other inequalities such as the future impossibility of obtaining a masters or doctoral degree for students with lower marks (usually less than 14, out of 20 for master's degree, or 16 out of 20 for doctorate), and the higher average completion time for graduation and subsequent entrance into the labour market, with different standards in so many heterogeneous institutions.

In the 2000s, there was a growing effort to define nonaccredited universities or accredited institutions which awarded nonaccredited degrees, as diploma mills, in order to raise awareness about the problem. In 2007, the State had planned to enforce in a near future more stringent rules for all kind of public and private degree-conferring institutions. Currently, after changes introduced by the Bologna process, master's degree programmes can be offered to any student who had completed the first study cycle (licenciatura) and enroll in the second study cycle (mestrado).

For instance, medicine is traditionally one of the most popular courses in Portugal, and therefore one of the most selective, with some of the highest rated secondary school top students competing with the best of the best for a place in a medicine course. Normally, a student who wants to attend the Medical School (Faculdade de Medicina) at one of the Portuguese public universities which exclusively offer this graduation course, has to get very high grades in the entrance exams (it may include exams in fields like chemistry, biology, and mathematics) and to have done an almost-brilliant secondary school course. Admission marks of the applicants admitted in medicine, are never less than 180 out of 200. Architecture, economics, a number of engineerings, dentistry, law, pharmacy, or veterinary medicine at most public universities, are, in general, another examples of courses which are traditionally the most selective or popular. In contrast with these, like in any other educational system in the world, there are many courses offered by private universities, polytechnic institutes, and public universities, where the entrance requirements are sharply below the average. There are also some courses with low or even no demand and condemned to be extinguished.

In the 1990s, the offer of law degrees in Portugal became widespread across the entire country through both public and private university institutions. By 2010, lower selectiveness and academic integrity levels, including in law schools previously known for its reputation and prestige, debased the average teaching of law in Portugal according to the head of the Ordem dos Advogados Marinho Pinto.

== Employability and underemployment ==
=== Employability ===
In Portugal, about 15% of the people with a degree are unemployed, and a larger proportion are underemployed. In 2008, the number of degree owners registered in the national network of job centers reached 60,000 (a registered graduate unemployment rate of nearly 8%).

After students graduate from a higher education institution, factors like the field of studies, the grade point average and the prestige of the teaching institution, are relatively important for getting a job. But most important is the current employment market.

Due to these factors, higher education courses with a higher employability rate include medicine (there is a very high demand for medical doctors across the whole country), some classic engineering specializations, and computer sciences.

Low employability is found among teaching, humanities and some social sciences fields of study, like history, geography, linguistics, philosophy, sociology; or to a lesser degree among the exact sciences and natural sciences, such as mathematics, physics, chemistry, biology or geology, when these courses are oriented towards a teaching career instead of a more technical or scientific research career.

Despite their generally high reputation, economics, law and architecture degrees, even from some of the most selective and prestigious schools, have had an increasingly low employability rate due to an excessive number of new graduates each year.

There are courses which used to have high or very high employability rates (at least during the 1990s) and currently are among the most precarious in terms of employment for new graduates. These include business administration, management, nursing and some health technician courses. The reduction of (a traditionally high) State expenditure allocated to job creation inside the public sector of the Portuguese economy since 2002–2003, in addition to the boom of the number of places offered to new students in those fields by an increasing number of private and public teaching institutions, disrupted supply and demand equilibrium.

Higher wages and better job conditions are usually offered by companies to the best fresh graduates of a number of highly reputed universities. Most Portuguese civil servants usually have better-than-average pay and benefits regardless of their personal educational quality.

An article was published by the Expresso dated 2004 which listed the most desirable graduates of universities and polytechnics by Portuguese companies in the fields of engineering, structural engineering, marketing, management, economics and finance. This non-scientific report used a survey made by some human resources recruiting firms, which means that the population surveyed comprised only the candidates who were seeking a job through those recruiting firms, and excluded the highly qualified candidates who were recruited directly by the companies, by other important recruiting firms, or were recruited by headhunters before graduation. Additionally, some graduates are recruited from local higher learning institutions through partnerships with local companies or other institutions, bypassing full and open competition.

World Bank research on human capital flight by country, reported in 2005 a rate of 20% of Portuguese graduates leaving the country for working abroad, one of the largest rates for countries with over 5 million inhabitants.

=== Underemployment ===
Underemployment among fresh and senior graduates has increased since the early 1990s. Among the degree owners with the highest rates of underemployment are those who earned degrees in teaching, psychology, philosophy, economics, business administration, management, technical accounting, sociology, short-cycle engineering (technical engineering), some non-traditional engineerings, law, journalism, languages, history, and related fields of study. Several thousand people in this situation, have part-time or full-time occupations in a range of unspecialized jobs for unskilled or marginally skilled workers.

== Rankings ==
The results and rankings of multi-criteria evaluation on higher education institutions may be controversial and are not definitive proof of the higher standard of one institution over the others. However, ranking-based evaluation could be useful to point out certain characteristics or trends of a given institution, like notability and growth, both nationwide and internationally.

=== Official state-managed ranking ===
The Portuguese Agência de Acreditação (state-managed Accreditation Agency) for higher education, and formally founded in 2007, will be responsible for the publication of the national ranking of higher education institutions and degrees.

=== The Times Higher Education Supplement ===
In 2007, according to The Times Higher Education Supplement (2007 QS World University Rankings, by QS – Quacquarelli Symonds), the University of Coimbra is ranked number 3 among the universities in the Portuguese-speaking countries (behind the University of São Paulo and the University of Campinas), and ranked 318 in the overall world rank. In 2006, according to The Times Higher Education Supplement (2006 QS World University Rankings, by QS – Quacquarelli Symonds), the University of Coimbra is ranked number 1 university in the Portuguese-speaking countries, and ranked 266 in the overall world rank.

=== Higher Education Evaluation and Accreditation Council of Taiwan ===
In 2008, a Higher Education Evaluation and Accreditation Council of Taiwan's ranking placed the University of Porto in the first position among the Portuguese universities by research output. The Ranking Iberoamericano de Instituciones de Investigación have placed the University of Porto in the 11th place by research output in Iberoamerican countries (Portugal, Spain, Brazil, Argentina, Chile, Colombia, Cuba, Mexico, Peru, and Venezuela), and first in Portugal. In 2007, a Higher Education Evaluation and Accreditation Council of Taiwan's ranking, placed the University of Porto in 459. It was the only Portuguese university in the top 500 according to the Taiwanese ranking.

=== Webometrics ===
Portuguese higher education institutions webometrics ranking, 2015 – Top 20 ranked according to indicators measuring web presence and impact.

National rank	World rank	Name	Type	Headquarters
1	162	University of Porto	public university	Porto
2	291	University of Coimbra	public university	Coimbra
3	319	Minho University	public university	Braga
4	424	New University of Lisbon	public university	Lisbon
5	503	University of Lisbon	public university	Lisbon
6	551	University of Aveiro	public university	Aveiro
7	966	Catholic University of Portugal	private university	Lisbon
8	1078	University of Beira Interior	public university	Covilhã
9	1099	University of Évora	public university	Évora
10	1164	University of the Algarve	public university	Faro
11	1171	Porto Polytechnic Institute	public polytechnic	Porto
12	1404	University of Trás-os-Montes and Alto Douro	public university	Vila Real
13	1658	University of Madeira	public university	Funchal
14	1660	University of the Azores	public university	Ponta Delgada
15	1704	Polytechnic Institute of Lisbon	public polytechnic	Lisbon
16	1788	Bragança Polytechnic Institute	public polytechnic	Bragança
17	1894	Viseu Polytechnic Institute	public polytechnic	Viseu
18	1913	Polytechnic Institute of Leiria	public polytechnic	Leiria
19	1975	Universidade Lusófona	private university	Lisbon
20	2102	Fernando Pessoa University	private university	Porto

== Research at institutions of higher learning ==
Academic research in 2003 represented about 50% of total expenditure in R&D (including expenditure by higher education and related non-profit institutions). Total expenditure (public and private) in R&D was 0.78% of the GDP, which had reached 0.85% in 2001, when the European average was 1.98% for the then-15 EU member-states. Overall, higher education and related non-profit institutions represented in 2003 about 74% of Portuguese researchers, with a total value of 24.726 researchers (i.e., head counts), representing 13.008 FTE researchers. In December 2004, higher education institutions included 11.316 teaching-staff members holding a PhD degree.

In 2001 Portugal was, for the first time in history, one of the countries of excellence that contributed to the top 1% of the world's highly cited publications. Spain was responsible for 2.08%, while Ireland and Greece accounted for 0.36% and 0.3%, respectively.

Within the higher education system, only university institutions carry out fundamental research.

- Research centers belonging to higher learning institutions accredited by FCT – Fundação para a Ciência e a Tecnologia, 2004

Type of institution	Number of research centers	Number of institutions
Public universities	384	14
Public polytechnics	8	15
Catholic University	14	1
Private universities	7	N/A
Other private institutions	20	N/A
Total	433	N/A

Source: FCT – Fundação para a Ciência e Tecnologia

== International partnership agreements ==
International partnership programmes and international conventions or agreements in higher education include:

- Portugal is a signatory of the Bologna process and therefore belongs to the European Higher Education Area. (see Higher education in Portugal#European Higher Education Area)
- Portugal is an active member of Socrates programme and Erasmus programme exchange scheme.
- Programa MIT-Portugal (see MIT-Portugal official site): is a partnership in graduate education and research in advanced systems engineering, bioengineering, energy and transportation systems, and also in management, involving the Massachusetts Institute of Technology (U.S.A.), Portuguese universities, other research institutions, and companies. Mariano Gago the Portuguese Minister of Science Technology and Higher Education said, in his perspective, about MIT-Portugal programme: "The worst (higher education institutions) should learn and the best should be ready to face the challenges". The institutions in this programme include: the Instituto Superior de Ciências do Trabalho e da Empresa (only in management), Minho University, New University of Lisbon, Catholic University of Portugal (only in management), Technical University of Lisbon, University of Coimbra, and the University of Porto. The program includes companies like Volkswagen's AutoEuropa, Amorim, and Simoldes, among others. The project is financed by the Government of Portugal and participants were selected by the Portuguese Ministry of Science, Technology and Higher Education based on multicriteria MIT's evaluation of the Portuguese institutions.
- Programa CMU-Portugal (see CMU-Portugal official site): is a partnership in information technology and communications, part of the national policy for the hi-tech boom, involving the Carnegie Mellon University (U.S.A.) and several Portuguese institutions including companies, such as Portugal Telecom, Siemens, Novabase and Critical Software, the eight faculties and colleges that integrate various research centres involved in the CMU-Portugal Program: Faculty of Sciences of Lisbon University, School of Engineering of Minho University, Faculty of Sciences and Technology of the New University of Lisbon, Faculty of Sciences and Technology of the University of Coimbra, Faculty of Economical and Enterprise Sciences of the Catholic University of Portugal, Faculty of Engineering of the University of Porto, Instituto Superior de Engenharia do Porto (IPP), and Instituto Superior Técnico (UTL). It also includes several other higher education institutions, such as the universities of Aveiro, Beira Interior and Algarve. This project will be financed by the national government and major hi-tech companies.
- Programa UTAustin-Portugal (see UTAustin-Portugal official site): is a partnership in graduate education and research involving the University of Texas at Austin (U.S.A.), several Portuguese universities, other research institutions and companies, including: the Instituto de Engenharia de Sistemas e Computadores do Porto, Instituto de Medicina Molecular, Instituto Pedro Nunes, University of Porto, New University of Lisbon, University of Aveiro, University of Coimbra, University of Lisbon, Instituto Superior de Ciências do Trabalho e da Empresa, and the Instituto Superior Técnico of the Technical University of Lisbon.
- Portuguese higher education students may be eligible to benefit from agreements with a number of other noted foreign universities and research organizations like the Harvard University, the European Space Agency (ESA), the European Laboratory for Particle Physics (CERN), the ITER, and the European Southern Observatory (ESO).
- The Lisbon MBA, an International MBA program offered in tie up of two leading Portuguese universities (UNL and UCP) in collaboration with the MIT Sloan School of Management gained lot of attention among the international students and received positive feedback.
- Harvard Medical School-Portugal, a program that facilitates new translational and clinical research, and will launch and streamline post-graduate medical training, and produce and publish quality medical and health information in Portugal.

== See also ==
- Academic ranks in Portugal
- Education in Portugal
- Higher education
- List of colleges and universities in Portugal
- Science and technology in Portugal

== Bibliography ==
- Guy Neave and Alberto Amaral (eds), Higher Education in Portugal 1974-2009: A Nation, a Generation (Heidelberg, Springer, 2012).

== Other resources ==
- Quality Assurance of Higher Education in Portugal – An Assessment of the Existing System and Recommendations for a Future System, Report by an ENQA (the European Association for Quality Assurance in Higher Education) review panel, November 2006
- Tertiary Education in Portugal – Background Report prepared to support the international assessment of the Portuguese system of tertiary education, Ministry of Science, Technology and Higher Education, (April 2006)
- CHEPS – Higher Education Monitor, Higher Education in Portugal, Ana-Maria Dima, February 2005 Country Report
- Education in Portugal – country-studies.com
- Euroeducation.net – Structure of Educational System in Portugal
- country-data.com Portugal – EDUCATION
- Funding higher education in Portugal: between State and market, Educ. Soc. vol.25 no.88 special, Campinas Oct. 2004
- Selected Statistics for Portugal, Source: UNESCO, Institute for Statistics
- NATIONAL REPORT ON THE IMPLEMENTATION OF THE BOLOGNA PROCESS (AUGUST 2003)
- Contribuição para a discussão pública do documento elaborado pelo Grupo de Trabalho para a reorganização do Ensino Superior, José Filipe dos Santos Oliveira, Professor at the F.C.T. – Universidade Nova de Lisboa (in Portuguese)
- Engenharia do Séc.XX (in Portuguese)
- JVCosta – Higher Education in Portugal (in Portuguese)
- MIT Portugal Program
