= Polytechnic University of Beja =

The Polytechnical Institute of Beja (Instituto Politécnico de Beja) is a state-run polytechnic institute of higher education, comprising several schools. It is located in Beja, on the south region of Alentejo, Portugal. It was established in 1979 and has about 35,000 students (as of 2023).

== Schools ==
- ESAB - Escola Superior Agrária de Beja
- ESEB - Escola Superior de Educação de Beja
- ESTIG - Escola Superior de Tecnologia e Gestão de Beja
- ESSB - Escola Superior de Saúde de Beja

== See also ==
- Higher education in Portugal
