= Instituto Superior de Engenharia do Porto =

Coordinates: 41°10′41″N 8°36′29″W

Porto Institute of Engineering
- Instituto Superior de Engenharia do Porto
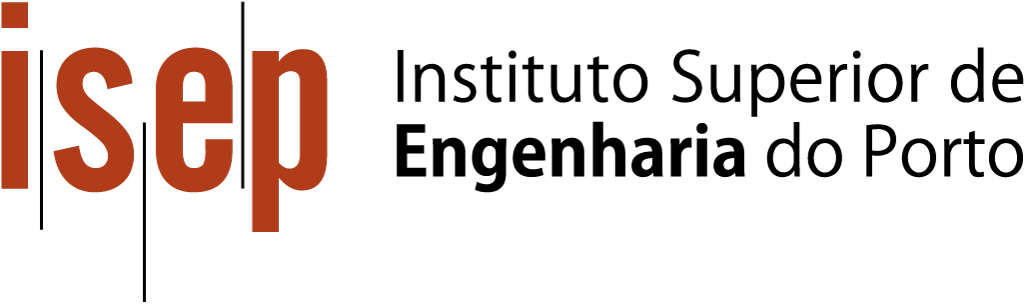
- Motto: Saber fazer ("Know-how")
- Type: Public university
- Established: 1852
- Parent institution: Technical University of Porto
- President: Roque Brandão
- Faculty: 567 (2025)
- Students: 7,013 (2025)
- Location: Porto, Portugal
- Colors: Grey & Crimson
- Mascot: Crimson Fox
- Website: http://www.isep.pt

The Porto Institute of Engineering (Instituto Superior de Engenharia do Porto,ISEP) is a public higher education engineering institution located in Porto, Portugal. Founded in 1852, it is the largest unit and engineering school of the Technical University of Porto. Located in the Asprela Innovation District, ISEP hosts over 7,000 students across 14 undergraduate (licenciatura), 15 master's degree (mestrado) programs, 4 doctoral (doutoramento) programmes, alongside several R&D facilities.

Its founding motto, Saber Fazer ("Know-how"), reflects its long-standing emphasis on applied sciences, hands-on technical instruction, and technological transfer to industry.

== History ==
=== Origins and Industrial Foundation (1852–1864) ===
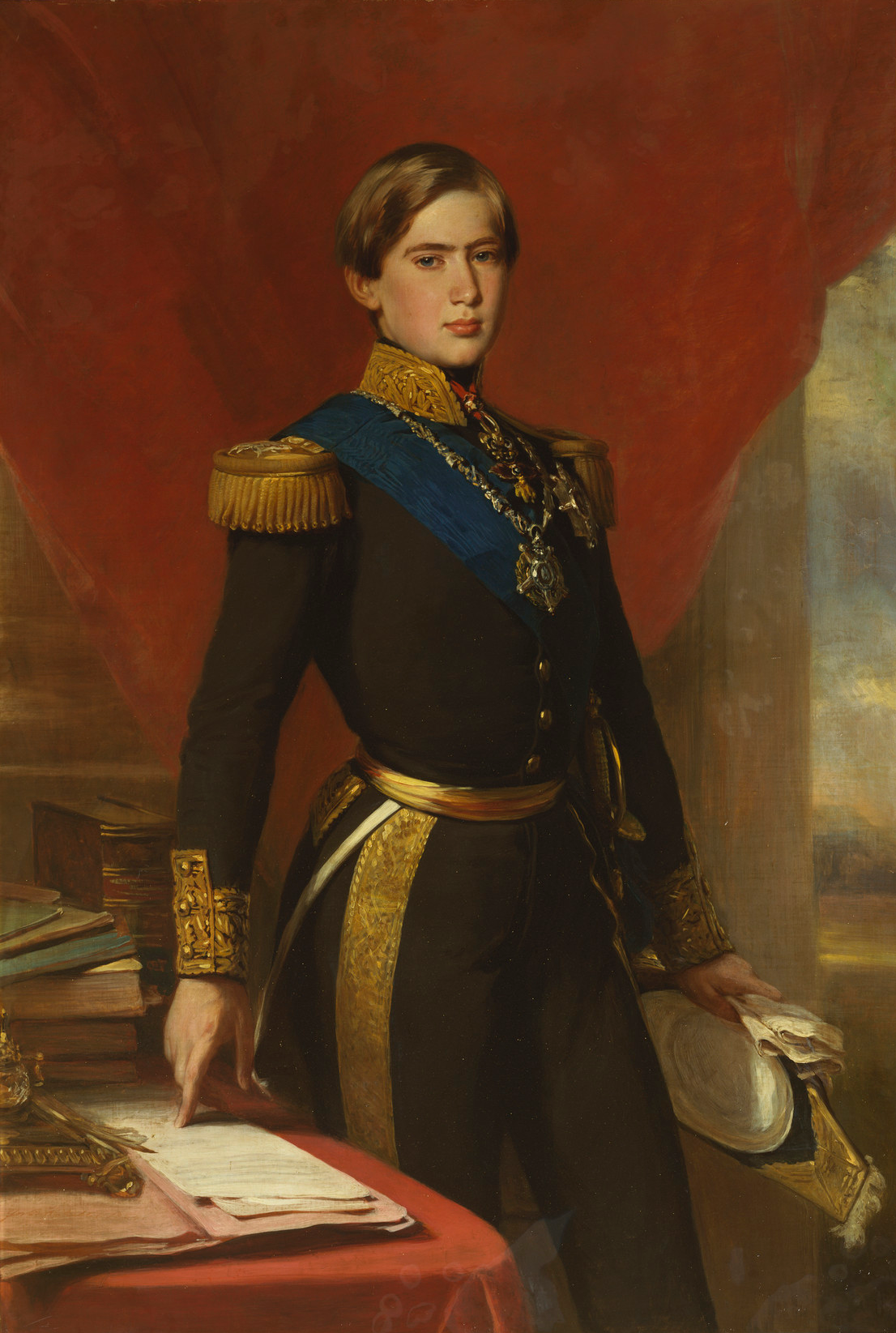
King Pedro V. Under his reign, the Porto Industrial School established the foundations of engineering education in Porto.

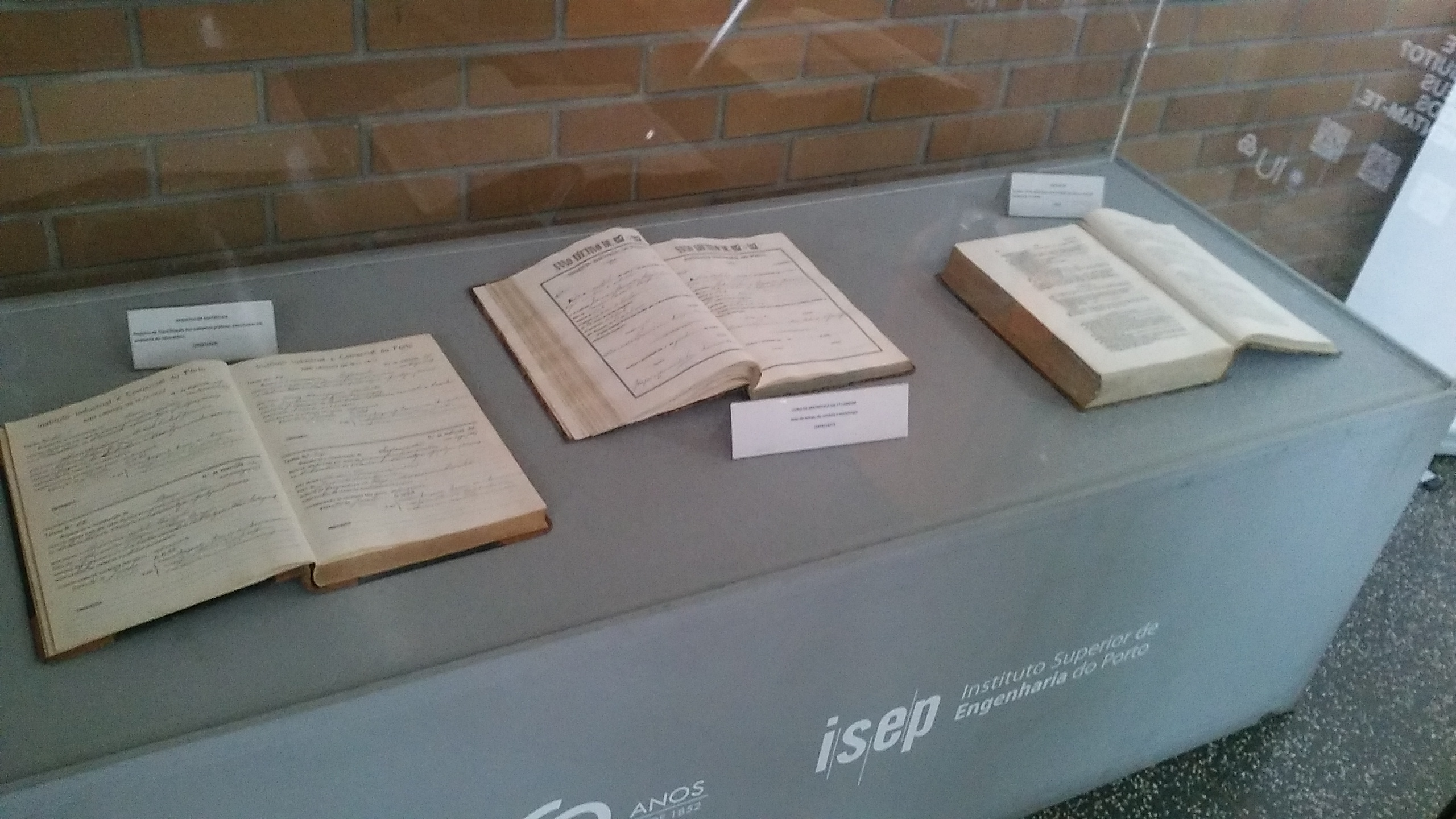
Exposition of early technical literature from the institution's origins.

Founded by decree of Minister Fontes Pereira de Melo on 30 December 1852, the Porto Industrial School (Escola Industrial do Porto) was established to provide practical and experimental technical education, breaking away from the perceived theoretical model of the contemporary Academia Polytechnica to directly serve the needs of the emerging Industrial Revolution in Northern Portugal. The institution was structured around key applied departments, focusing heavily on technical drawing, mechanics, industrial chemistry, civil works, and commercial sciences to supply skilled directors, master craftsmen, and technicians for regional factories.

Patronized by King Pedro V, who advocated for vocational and scientific instruction over traditional scholasticism, the school operated in close proximity to Porto’s manufacturing and artistic sectors. In its initial decades, the school's evening courses in linear drawing, mechanics, and chemistry attracted a diverse cohort of students —including master builders, artisans, future industrialists, and prominent figures in Portuguese culture— shaping a practical technical elite that would design and construct the region's bridges, factories, and transport networks. Notable alumni include Silva Porto (1850–1893), a major figure in Portuguese Naturalist painting, who enrolled in industrial drawing in 1865, and José Joaquim Teixeira Lopes (1837–1918), a prominent sculptor who studied linear drawing at the school in the late 1850s.

=== Porto Industrial Institute (1864–1975) ===
Following its elevation to the Porto Industrial Institute (Instituto Industrial do Porto – IIP) in 1864, the institution solidified its role as a center for applied science and industrial leadership. Applied chemistry and mechanics laboratories catered to the expanding textile and footwear industries, while machine engineering courses supplied the region's growing metallurgy and foundry sectors. In 1884–1885, Josephina Baptista Azevedo da Cruz (b. 1864), a 20-year-old primary school teacher, became the first woman to enroll at the IIP, taking voluntary courses in Applied Physics, Applied Chemistry, and French and English. Under a major educational reform introduced by Minister Emídio Navarro in 1886, the school was renamed the Industrial and Commercial Institute of Porto (Instituto Industrial e Comercial do Porto – IICP). This reform pioneered electrical engineering education in Portugal through dedicated chairs and laboratories in electrotechnics, while simultaneously expanding commercial education. This integrated commercial branch offered advanced studies in mercantile accounting, political economy, and modern languages, structuring the logistics and export networks crucial to Northern Portugal’s corporate ecosystem and the Port Wine trade.

While traditional institutions like the University of Coimbra and Porto's contemporary academies focused primarily on theoretical sciences and humanities, Porto Industrial Institute and its successor, the IICP, served as the practical backbone for Northern Portugal's economy. The institutes trained a rising technical middle class —including factory directors, master builders, industrial chemists, accountants, and engineers —tailored specifically to the region's operational demands. Prominent alumnus António Almeida da Costa completed his technical training before founding the landmark Devesas Ceramic Factory (Fábrica de Cerâmica das Devesas), one of the largest industrial complexes in Northern Portugal. Concurrently, chemist António Joaquim Ferreira da Silva modernized the institution's laboratories in the late 19th century, pioneering advanced research in analytical chemistry and legal medicine that directly served regional industry and public health.

Following the 1918 division of the Industrial and Commercial Institutes of Porto, the Porto Industrial Institute and the Porto Commercial Institute (Instituto Comercial do Porto – ICP) became Northern Portugal's primary hubs for applied technical and vocational instruction. Throughout the mid-20th century, Porto Industrial Institute supplied the technical workforce—including site managers, surveyors, and practical engineers —essential for national public works and regional industrial growth under the Estado Novo.

During the 1930s and 1950s, nationwide educational overhauls —most notably the Cordeiro Ramos Reform (Decree No. 20,419 of 1931) and the Law of Industrial Development (Lei de Fomento Industrial, Law No. 2,002 of 1945)—redefined technical instruction. The Porto Industrial Institute trained technical personnel responsible for managing the textile, metallurgy, and footwear factories concentrated across the Ave Valley, Maia, Guimarães, and Vila Nova de Famalicão, as well as technicians involved in major infrastructure projects, such as the regional electrical grid, railway connections, and the hydroelectric development of the Douro River basin.

Driven by regional industrial expansion and Portugal's opening to European markets through EFTA in the late 1960s, Porto Industrial Institute modernized its curricula to meet international standards. Operations moved to the Asprela campus (Campus 1) in 1968 to accommodate expanding technical operations and modern laboratory infrastructure.

=== Engineering Institute and the Bologna Era (1975–Present) ===
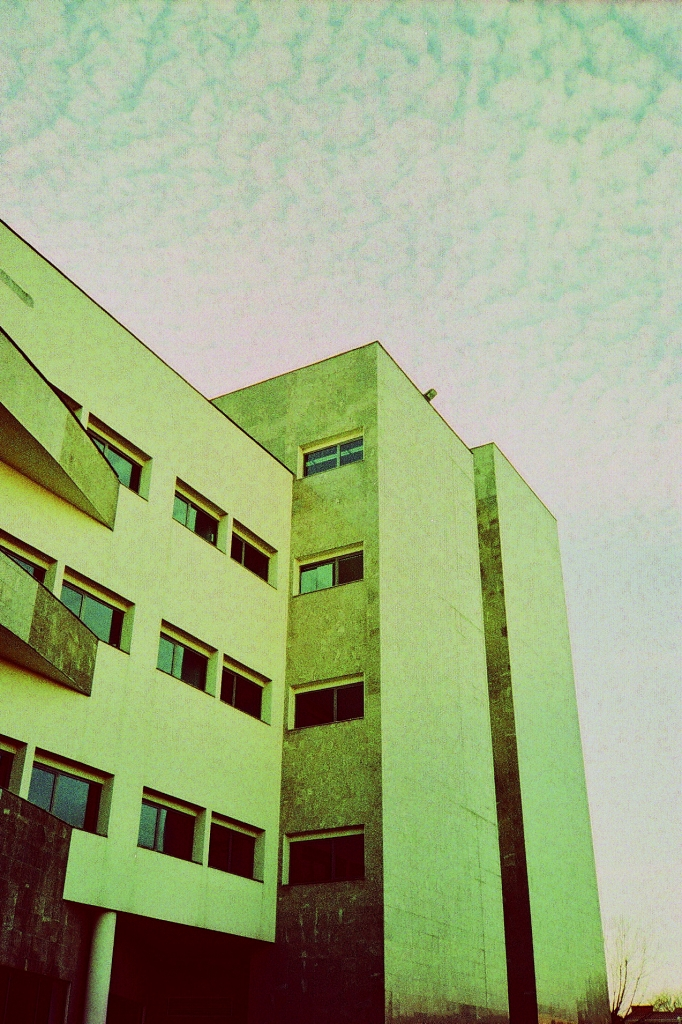
The Industrial Institute of Porto is transformed into the Engineering Institute of Porto in 1975.

These developments laid the groundwork for the post-1974 democratic reforms that elevated the IIP in 1974 into degree-granting higher institute of engineering (ISEP). Legacy professional diploma holders converted their qualifications into the newly established bacharelato (bachelor's equivalent) degree. Initially restricted to three-year practical degrees, conferring the title of technical engineer (engenheiro técnico), the institutes began introducing post-graduate specialized diplomas (Diploma de Estudos Superiores Especializados – DESE) in 1988–1989, establishing a dedicated applied higher education track.

In 1989, ISEP was integrated as an autonomous engineering school within the newly created Polytechnic Institute of Porto (now Technical University of Porto) under Decreto-Lei n.º 389/88. In 1998, it introduced two-cycle licenciatura bietápica programs, granting full licentiate degrees equivalent to university engineering tracks.

With the adoption of the Bologna Process in 2007, ISEP adjusted its study plans into 3-year first-cycle BSc (licenciatura) and 2-year second-cycle MSc degrees. In 2014, ISEP achieved the highest number of EUR-ACE label certified engineering degrees among Portuguese higher education institutions. In 2017, its MSc program in Informatics Engineering became the first master's degree in Portugal to receive accreditation from the United States-based ABET (Engineering Accreditation Commission).

=== Transition to the Technical University of Porto (2026) ===
The year 2026 marked a major institutional transformation when the institution was elevated to the Technical University of Porto (UTP). As the oldest and founding branch of the university system, ISEP's original foundation date of 30 December 1852 was adopted as the historic founding year of the newly constituted Technical University of Porto.

On 1 June 2026, the ISEP campus hosted the Prime Minister of Portugal and the Minister of Education, Science and Innovation for the official announcement of the government's decision to establish the university. Porto Polytechnic President Paulo Pereira highlighted the milestone as a strategic leap for higher education, innovation, and economic development in Northern Portugal, particularly across the Porto Metropolitan Area and the Tâmega e Sousa region. On 1 September 2026, the main Auditorium of ISEP hosted the solemn Inauguration Ceremony of the Governing and Management Bodies of the Technical University of Porto, establishing ISEP as the university's flagship engineering school.

== Campus ==
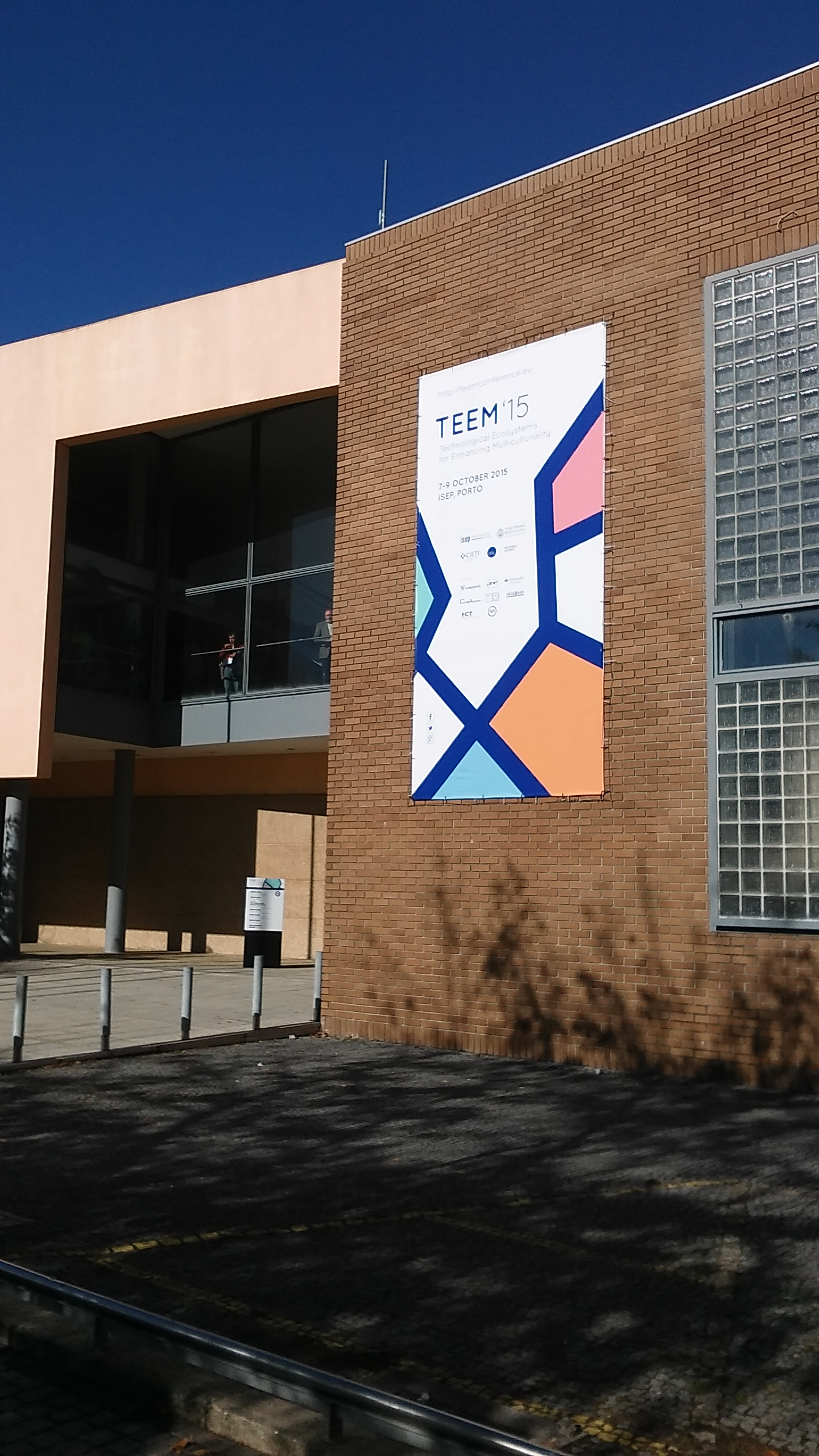
Main entrance of ISEP, UTP's engineering school and major R&D hub in Asprela.

ISEP occupies a dedicated 50,000 m² campus situated in Campus 1 (Asprela) of the Technical University of Porto. Located within Northern Portugal's highest-density innovation corridor—the Asprela Innovation District—the campus shares an urban footprint with several faculties of the University of Porto, the São João University Hospital, and major national research organizations.

The campus facilities include lecture halls, advanced research laboratories, digital fabrication spaces (*FabLabs*), computational clusters, student association facilities, and engineering workshops.

== Departments ==
Academic and research activities are organized across eight departments:

- DEC – Department of Civil Engineering
- DEG – Department of Geotechnical Engineering
- DEQ – Department of Chemical Engineering
- DEE – Department of Electrical and Computer Engineering
- DEM – Department of Mechanical Engineering
- DEI – Department of Informatics Engineering (Software Engineering and Computer Science)
- DMA – Department of Mathematics
- DFI – Department of Physics
- DOG – Department of Management and Organization

== Academics ==
ISEP offers higher education qualifications fully integrated within the European Higher Education Area (Bologna Process) framework, spanning 14 degree programmes (licenciaturas), 15 master's degree programmes (mestrados), and 4 doctoral degrees (doutoramentos).

=== Undergraduate Programs (BSc / Licenciatura) ===
Undergraduate education forms the foundational pillar of ISEP's academic offering, comprising three-year licenciatura programmes fully aligned with the Bologna framework. Admission to these programmes is highly competitive through the National Competition for Access to Higher Education (CNAES), with overall student demand consistently outstripping available capacity across engineering, business, health, and education fields.

In 2026, the institution's largest programmes by annual student intake included Computer Engineering (201 seats), Electrical and Computer Engineering (176 seats), and Mechanical Engineering (120 seats). Selective admission thresholds reflected high entry standards across various disciplines, led by top entry scores in Industrial Engineering and Management (181.0 out of 200), Mechanical Engineering (169.0 out of 200), and Biomedical Engineering (156.8 out of 200).

The undergraduate academic portfolio offered by the institute includes the following degree programmes:

- Biorrecursos (Bioresources)
- Engenharia Biomédica (Biomedical Engineering)
- Engenharia Civil (Civil Engineering)
- Engenharia de Sistemas (Systems Engineering)
- Engenharia de Telecomunicações e Informática (Telecommunications and Informatics Engineering)
- Engenharia e Gestão Industrial (Industrial Engineering and Management)
- Engenharia Eletrotécnica — Sistemas Elétricos de Energia (Electrical Engineering — Power Systems)
- Engenharia Eletrotécnica e de Computadores (Electrical and Computer Engineering)
- Engenharia Física Aplicada (Applied Physics Engineering)
- Engenharia Geotécnica e Geoambiente (Geotechnical and Geoenvironmental Engineering)
- Engenharia Informática (Informatics Engineering)
- Engenharia Mecânica (Mechanical Engineering)
- Engenharia Mecânica Automóvel (Automotive Mechanical Engineering)
- Engenharia Química (Chemical Engineering)

=== Graduate Programs (MSc / Mestrado) ===
Postgraduate education at ISEP encompasses 15 master's degree programmes (second-cycle) and 4 doctoral programmes (third-cycle).

Master's Programmes (15)

- Engenharia Automóvel (Automotive Engineering)
- Engenharia Biomédica (Biomedical Engineering)
- Engenharia Civil (Civil Engineering)
- Engenharia de Biorrecursos (Bioresources Engineering)
- Engenharia de Energias Sustentáveis (Sustainable Energy Engineering)
- Engenharia de Inteligência Artificial (Artificial Intelligence Engineering)
- Engenharia de Sistemas Computacionais Críticos (Critical Computing Systems Engineering)
- Engenharia e Gestão da Cadeia de Abastecimento (Supply Chain Management and Engineering)
- Engenharia e Gestão Industrial (Industrial Engineering and Management)
- Engenharia Eletrotécnica — Sistemas Elétricos de Energia (Electrical Engineering — Power Systems)
- Engenharia Eletrotécnica e de Computadores (Electrical and Computer Engineering)
- Engenharia Geotécnica e Geoambiente (Geotechnical and Geoenvironmental Engineering)
- Engenharia Informática (Informatics Engineering)
- Engenharia Mecânica (Mechanical Engineering)
- Engenharia Química (Chemical Engineering)

=== Doctoral studies (PhD / Doutoramento) ===
The institution's authority to grant doctoral degrees predates its formal university designation under the national framework of Law no. 16/2023. Its doctoral portfolio includes programs in Artificial Intelligence and Intelligent Systems Engineering, Electrical and Computer Engineering, Analytical Chemistry and Environmental Sustainability Engineering, and Mechanical Engineering and Sustainable Production.

=== Accreditations ===
Academic programs across the institution hold several national and international quality accreditations. In engineering, multiple degree programs at the Institute of Engineering (ISEP) have been awarded the international European Accredited Engineer EUR-ACE quality label, certified through the European Network for Accreditation of Engineering Education (ENAEE) and the Portuguese Order of Engineers (Ordem dos Engenheiros). Additionally, selected engineering master's programs, including the Master of Science in Informatics Engineering, hold international accreditation by the Engineering Accreditation Commission of ABET (Accreditation Board for Engineering and Technology).

== Research & Development ==
As the historical engineering core, ISEP serves as the Technical University of Porto primary R&D powerhouse, accounting for the vast majority of international patents, scientific citations, and competitive European funding. Its research ecosystem translates cutting-edge science into industrial applications, offering students and researchers direct involvement in advanced technological innovation and international consortiums.

Advanced technological research is anchored by CISTER (Research Centre in Real-Time & Embedded Computing Systems) and the LSA (Autonomous Systems Laboratory). CISTER holds the highest FCT rating and is a center specializing in safety-critical computing, real-time operating systems, and cyber-physical architectures. The center leads large-scale European research initiatives (such as Horizon Europe and ARTEMIS/ECSEL consortia) in partnership with aerospace and automotive companies including Airbus, Embraer, and Bosch to develop fault-tolerant embedded software for avionics and autonomous vehicles. Complementing this software focus, the Autonomous Systems Laboratory (LSA)—integrated into the INESC TEC Associated Laboratory network—specializes in field robotics, autonomous navigation, and sensor fusion. LSA has developed custom marine, aerial, and land robotic platforms—such as the ROAZ autonomous surface vehicle and FALCOS unmanned aerial systems—for oceanographic monitoring, maritime search and rescue, and environmental security.

Beyond CISTER and LSA, ISEP's scientific output is structured across several specialized research centers:

- GECAD (Knowledge Engineering and Decision Support Research Group): Globally recognized for research in artificial intelligence, multi-agent systems, smart grids, and intelligent decision support.
- GRAQ (Group of Reaction and Chemical Engineering): Specialized in analytical chemistry, environmental monitoring, green chemistry, and water quality assessment.
- CIDEM (Center for Research and Development in Mechanical Engineering): Focuses on advanced manufacturing, industrial logistics, materials processing, and biomechanics.
- GILT (Games, Interaction and Learning Technologies): Research at the intersection of computer science, human-computer interaction (HCI), and immersive technologies (AR/VR).
- G3S (Soils and Structures Group): Research on geotechnics, sustainable construction materials, and civil infrastructure monitoring.
- GGE (Group of Research in Engineering and Technology Education): Focused on pedagogical innovation and STEM methodologies in engineering.
- LEPABE / ALiCE (ISEP Pole): Collaborative research in chemical engineering, biotechnology, and environmental sustainability.

== See also ==
- Technical University of Porto
- Higher education in Portugal
- Ordem dos Engenheiros
