= Mário Crespo =

Portuguese journalist

- Born: Mário Crespo; 13 April 1947 (age 79); Coimbra, Portugal
- Education: Instituto Superior Técnico
- Occupation: Journalist
- Years active: 1974-2014
- Spouse: Leonor Alfaro

Mário Crespo (born April 13, 1947) is a Portuguese retired journalist and reporter.

== Early life ==
He was born in Coimbra. His father was an employee of the Portuguese bank Banco Nacional Ultramarino (BNU), and his mother, a professor at the Commercial School. As civil servants of the Portuguese Empire, they moved to Portuguese Mozambique capital, Lourenço Marques, with their only baby son. Mário Crespo went back to Europe with his mother, but returned to Mozambique and finished his high school in the Mozambican capital. Only when the university life appeared before him did he move one more time to the metropole (i.e. Mainland Portugal). In Lisbon, he went to the Colégio Universitário Pio XII (a kind of boarding school) and attended the Instituto Superior Técnico (IST), the engineering school of the Technical University of Lisbon.

== The Portuguese Colonial War ==
In 1970, 22-year-old Crespo had dropped out of IST and was eventually drafted into military service in the Portuguese Colonial War. He transferred to Mozambique where his military occupation was to check the cement cargoes from Beira to the Cahora Bassa Dam construction site, near Tete. Some time later, due to his good fluency in English, he was placed in the press office of Kaúlza de Arriaga, the commander in chief of the Portuguese Armed Forces in Mozambique, who had coordinated a massive anti-guerrilla operation against FRELIMO separatists in 1970 - the Gordian Knot Operation. While serving in the army, Crespo also entered the newly created School of Medicine of the University of Lourenço Marques where he would complete a number of academic disciplines but not graduate. He married Helen de Souza from Johannesburg, a South African woman with Portuguese ancestry who worked in genetics. After the Carnation Revolution left-leaning military coup at Lisbon in April 1974, fresh out of the troop, Crespo fled Mozambique for South Africa.

== Life in South Africa ==
The Mozambican transition to independence was marked by the mass exodus of ethnic Portuguese citizens from a territory that was about to become a totalitarist Marxist–Leninist failed state - the People's Republic of Mozambique. Many Portuguese went to neighbouring South Africa, others choose Europe, the US, and Brazil as destination. Those who returned to Portugal were collectively known as Retornados. In South Africa Mário Crespo found employment in Johannesburg as a trainee radio employee of the South African Broadcasting Corporation (SABC). A couple of years later, television was launched in South Africa and the editorial staff of the radio was called to perform on the screen. Working for SABC, Crespo reached the capacity of Chief Editor. In 1981 he divorced Helen de Souza, and by 1982, in his own words, South Africa's apartheid "had become claustrophobic". There was a vacancy in the Voice of America in Washington, D.C., for him, but it was considered of little professional interest.

== Return to Portugal and life in the US ==
Crespo probed Radiotelevisão Portuguesa (RTP) in Lisbon, where vacancies were also opened. Throughout two decades working for RTP, Crespo reached notability as a reporter and journalist, and made friendship with other personalities of the Portuguese media such as José Eduardo Moniz, Manuela Moura Guedes, and Miguel Sousa Tavares. Mário Crespo was a RTP reporter in the First Gulf War as well as a White House accredited journalist in Washington, D.C. He described the time he lived in the US with his second wife, Leonor Alfaro, and children as the best of his life. During the socialist legislature of Portuguese Prime Minister António Guterres, Crespo was removed from his capacity as a reporter in the US. Back to Lisbon, Crespo's responsibilities and work for RTP were scaled down. He was placed in standby and later would accuse RTP administration of ostracizing him. In this period of his life he taught nightclasses at the Independente University.

== SIC Notícias ==
Depressed and on a shrinking salary, Crespo resigned from his contract with RTP and sought a job at the SIC Notícias television channel in the year 2000, to be an international information correspondent, and it turned out not to happen. Emídio Rangel, the news channel's director at the time, offered him an extra contract. He presented the prime time news program on the Jornal das 9 channel, and also the talk-shows Pontos de Vista and Plano Inclinado whose resident guests included Medina Carreira, Nuno Crato and João Duque, and the American television news magazine 60 Minutes in a Portuguese version.

On March 26, 2014, he presented the last Jornal das 9 news program making a critical speech at the end saying "God bless Portugal".

== Personal life ==
Crespo is married to Leonor Alfaro, a Portuguese woman with South African and Mozambican background, who works as a lawyer for the Portuguese Ministry of Culture. They have two sons, Ricardo and Eduardo, and a daughter, Denise. He is an avid sailor. In his youth his parents got divorced and he stayed with his mother. His mother's lawyer was António de Almeida Santos, at the time a prominent lawyer in Lourenço Marques, Portuguese Mozambique.
