= Polytechnic University of Viseu =

Portuguese public higher education institution

Coordinates: 40.6466°N 7.9197°W

- Universidade Politécnica de Viseu
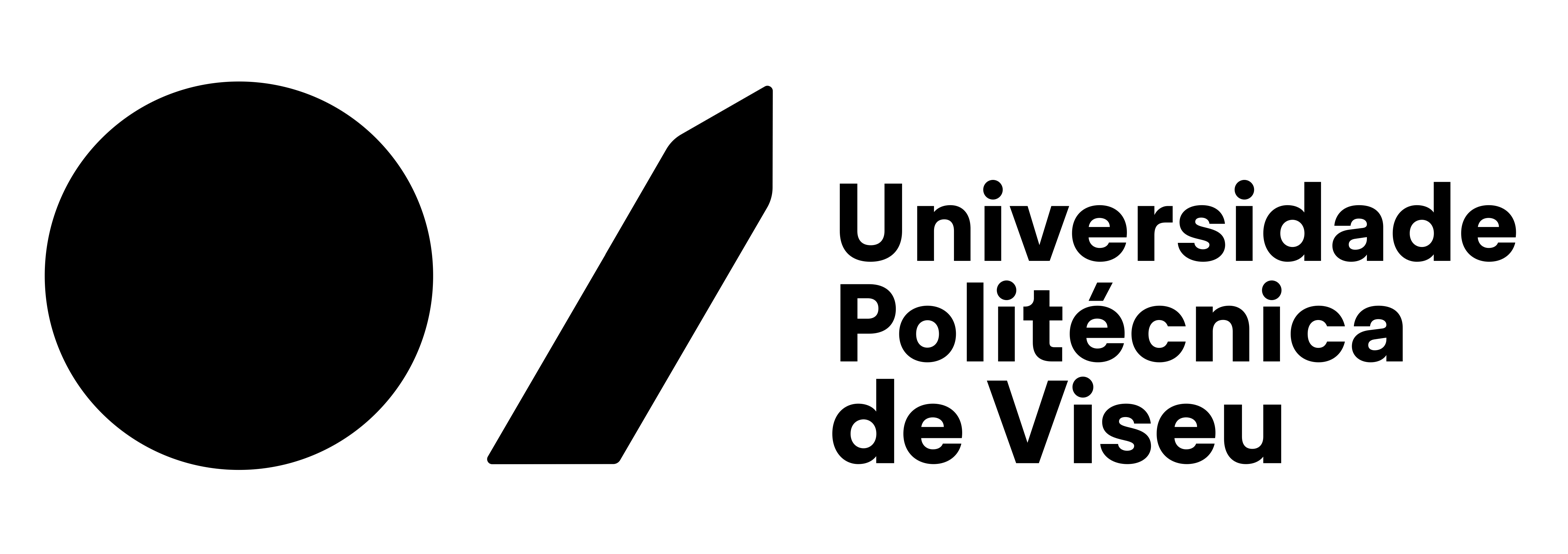
- Former name: Instituto Politécnico de Viseu (1979–2026)
- Motto: O Futuro é Agora
- Motto in English: The Future Is Now
- Type: Public polytechnic university
- Established: December 26, 1979; 46 years ago
- Budget: €34.3 million (2026)
- President: José dos Santos Costa
- Academic staff: 355 (2025)
- Administrative staff: 230 (2025)
- Students: More than 5,700 (2025)
- Location: Viseu, Viseu District, 3504-510, Portugal
- Campus: Urban; Viseu and Lamego
- Language: Portuguese
- Colours: Black and White
- Website: www.ipv.pt

Founded on December 26, 1979, the Polytechnic University of Viseu (Universidade Politécnica de Viseu, UPV) is a Portuguese public higher education institution headquartered in Viseu. It was established as the Instituto Politécnico de Viseu in 1979 and adopted its current name on 1 August 2026 following the entry into force of Law No. 32/2026, which created the legal framework for the conversion of eligible polytechnic institutes into polytechnic universities.

Today it is an essential part of the city of Viseu and the wider region. From its birth to today, it has been the driving force of scientific, technological, cultural and economic development, namely through its teaching and research activities, of cultural, scientific and technological diffusion, of partnerships, inter-institutional protocols and collaborations with companies and other institutions.

The diversified range of training offered in undergraduate, master's, post-graduate and post-graduate courses and Professional Technical Courses (Cursos Técnicos Superiores Profissionais - CTeSP - in Portuguese) combined with a strategy of partnerships with the business community, educational, cultural and social of the region, aims to provide to their graduates a rapid insertion in working life and development and progress to the region and country.

In total, the Polytechnic University of Viseu offers 32 undergraduate courses, 33 master's degrees, 15 postgraduate courses, 6 postgraduate degrees and 32 CTeSP, making a total of 118 courses, distributed in 5 Higher Schools.

== Transition to university status ==
On 1 August 2026, the institution officially adopted the name Polytechnic University of Viseu (UPV), replacing the former Instituto Politécnico de Viseu (IPV). The change followed the entry into force of Portuguese Law No. 32/2026, which amended the legal framework for higher education and allowed accredited polytechnic institutes to become polytechnic universities.

== Higher Schools and Campus ==
The Polytechnic University of Viseu consists of five Higher Schools and a community consisting of 4944 students, 380 professors and 230 employees.

The Higher Schools that make up the UPV are the following:

- ESEV - Escola Superior de Educação de Viseu (School of Education of Viseu) [1]

The Viseu Higher School of Education (ESEV) was the first organic unit of a Polytechnic Institute to operate in Portugal since 1983. It occupies the building of the former School of Primary Magisterium in Viseu.

Being one of the five organic units that make up the Polytechnic Institute of Viseu (UPV), ESEV focuses on the scientific, cultural, artistic and technical training of qualified professionals, in articulation with the provision of services to the community, research and strengthening of partnership networks with regional, national and international entities for the development of projects and activities of common interest.

- ESTGV - Escola Superior de Tecnologia e Gestão de Viseu (School of Technology and Management of Viseu) [1]

Founded in 1985, it began teaching the Management course in the academic year 1987/1988.

The ESTGV, as a higher education institution, is a center for the creation, diffusion and transmission of culture, science and technology, articulating its activities in the fields of education, vocational training, research and community service. The ESTGV follows quality standards that attempt to ensure adequate training to meet the needs of the community.

- ESAV - Escola Superior Agrária de Viseu (School of Agriculture of Viseu) [1]

ESAV was officially founded in 1994, thus continuing Viseu's tradition of agricultural education, as the city was a pioneer in agricultural education in Portugal through the creation of the Practical School of Agriculture of Viseu, by Decree of December 16, 1852.

ESAV intends to transmit and disseminate knowledge in order to train students with a high level of competence in the areas of agrarian, food and veterinary science; to promote applied research and its dissemination, cultural, scientific and technological exchange with similar national and international institutions and the relationship with the business community in order to contribute to the development of the region and the country.

- ESTGL - Escola Superior de Tecnologia e Gestão de Lamego (School of Technology and Management of Lamego) [2]

Created in 1999, its teaching activities began in 2000/2001, with the degrees of Management and Informatics and Tourism, Cultural and Heritage Management.

ESTGL currently offers undergraduate and master's degrees, aiming to develop other training areas equally related to management, social work, administration, tourism, IT and new technologies.

- ESSV - Escola Superior de Saúde de Viseu (School of Health of Viseu) [3]

The School of Health of Viseu is a higher education institution located in the city of Viseu, Portugal, which resulted from the integration of the Nursing School.

The Nursing School of Viseu was created in 1971 and began its teaching and scientific activities at the service of Nursing training in October 1974. Its integration as an Organic Unit of the Polytechnic University of Viseu took place in January 2001. In February 2005, was transformed into a School of Health.

== Official Tuna Académica ==
A tuna is a group of university students in traditional university dress who play traditional instruments and sing serenades. The tradition originated in Spain and Portugal in the 13th century as a means of students to earn money or food. Nowadays students don't belong to a "tuna" for money nor food, but seek to keep a tradition alive, to have fun, to travel, and to meet new people from other universities. A senior member of a tuna is a "tunante", but is usually known simply as a "tuno". The newbies/freshmen are known as "caloiros".

In the case of the Polytechnic Institute of Viseu, in 1998, the Students' Association of the School of Technology and Management of Viseu, represented by its president, accepted the challenge from a former tuno from another college to found a unique tuna of the Polytechnic Institute of Viseu.

With the collaboration of the Council of Viriato (unofficial organ of the IPV) and with the contribution of freshmen of the Institution, on May 3, 1998, with three months of rehearsals, the TUNA DO ISPV was born, with its first public presentation at the 14th Academic Week of Viseu.

After a year, the Academy's anthem appeared. It is original song, written by João João Oliveira and titled "Viseu Graciosa".

On December 6, 2003, the tuna gave a show at the IPV theater, entitled "Por ruelas e calçadas" ("By Alleys and Sidewalks"), which led to the release of the tuna's first CD.

On the 6th anniversary, in 2004, the tuna decided to add to its name the designation TUNADÃO 1998, highlighting the connection to the Dão Demarcated Region and the year 1998, the year of its foundation.

Also that same year, the first festival organized by TUNADÃO 1998, the CITADÃO began. The name CITADÃO was used to combine the type of event with the region where we are inserted (Certame Internacional de Tunas Académicas do Dão-Lafões). The Festival is held annually and features national and international tunas.

Tuna of UPV has represented the academy and the city of Viseu throughout the country, including in Azores (2006) and Madeira (2008).

Ten years after its formation, to commemorate the anniversary, the Tuna released its second CD "De capa bem traçada", recorded in studio.

The Tuna has adopted a rigid hierarchy. This hierarchy is structured as: Tuno-Mestre, Tunos Ilustres, Tunos Doctors / Engineers / Nurses (depending on the course they attend), Tunos, Caloiros and finally Apprentice.

At UPV, it is prohibited to practice the praxe académica.

== Culture ==
- Galeria Virtual (Virtual Gallery)

The "Galeria Virtual" is a space for the presentation and dissemination of plastic arts. It features works by several artists, and allows anyone to display work that meets certain quality standards.

- Revista Millenium - Scientific journal of the UPV

Revista Millenium is a scientific journal published by the UPV through the Center for Education, Technology and Health Studies (CI & DETS). The journal is available for free electronically, and is published in abilingual format.

- Polistécnica - The Information Magazine of the UPV

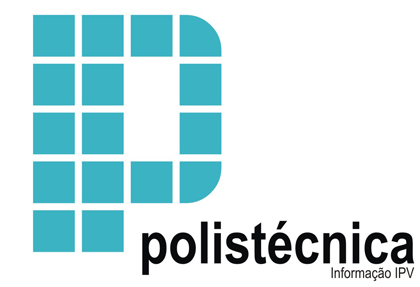

Founded in 2001, UPV's institutional information magazine first appeared in print edition (quarterly at the beginning and semi-annually thereafter), and an online version was later launched.

In 2012, the UPV magazine became monthly and exclusively online, in the form of institutional newsletter.

== Traje Académico de Viseu (Academic Dress of Viseu) ==
In Portugal, following an ancient tradition, university students use a highly specific dress. The Traje Académico, as it is known in Portuguese, is recognized by its almost totally black color and cape.

== See also ==
- Higher education in Portugal
