= Independente University =

Former private university in Lisbon, Portugal

Independente University (in Portuguese Universidade Independente or UnI for short) was a private university, headquartered in Lisbon, Portugal, founded in 1993 by Luís Arouca, Rui Verde and Amadeu Lima Carvalho; it was owned by SIDES (Sociedade Independente Para O Desenvolvimento do Ensino Superior). UnI was closed by order of the state education authorities in 2007, due to pedagogical and financial irregularities.

== Closure ==
In 2006, UnI came under investigation on alleged irregularities on several matters, relating to both its academics and management. In early 2007, it had entered into talks about possible merger with the Universidade Internacional, another private university; however, on 9 April 2007, the Portuguese Minister of Science, Technology and Higher Education, Mariano Gago, announced that UnI would be shut down by the Portuguese Government after the investigation reported serious pedagogical, ethical and financial irregularities. UnI shut down in October 2007.

Following the investigation, twenty-six principles at Universidade Independente were indicted, and twenty-four brought to trial for their part in its mismanagement. Most of those indicted were convicted of crimes, mostly document forgery and tax evasion. Rui Verde, who is currently a professor at Oxford University, the editor at the journalism platform MakaAngola headed by Rafael Marques de Morais and a former vice-rector at the Independent University, was sentenced to 4 years and 2 months suspended prison sentence for falsifying documents, forgery and qualified tax fraud.

== Prominent graduates ==
- José Sócrates, the Portuguese prime-minister, member of the Portuguese Socialist Party, earned his licenciatura (licentiate) degree in civil engineering from UnI in 1996. Since the outburst of the UnI scandal and loss of credibility of the institution, the media investigated Sócrates' student file and found inconsistencies which raised suspicions of irregularities, being the most notable the part where Sócrates' diploma was issued in a Sunday, day on which the university was closed. State authorities investigated the case and archived the file as the suspicions against José Sócrates turned out to not have enough evidence.
- Armando Vara, Portuguese politician, member of the Portuguese Socialist Party, former Minister, and banking administrator. He was awarded a degree by UnI in 2005. Vara, a close friend of José Sócrates, was awarded the degree just days before he was appointed to a high ranked administration position in the state-run bank, Caixa Geral de Depósitos, which position was open only to candidates with at least one academic degree, regardless of subject.

== Prominent professors ==
- Mário Crespo, journalist and reporter.
- Alberto João Jardim, President of the Regional Government of the Autonomous Region of Madeira for 37 years, member of the Portuguese Social Democratic Party, was an Invited Professor at UnI.
- Fernando Carvalho Rodrigues, physicist and electronic engineer, responsible for the PoSAT-1 project.
- Filipe La Féria, theatre director and producer, screenwriter and producer for television.

== See also ==
- Higher education in Portugal
- List of colleges and universities in Portugal
- Southeastern University (Washington, D.C.)
