= Instituto Superior de Ciências Policiais e Segurança Interna =

Higher Institute of Police Sciences and Internal Security
- Instituto Superior de Ciências Policiais e Segurança Interna
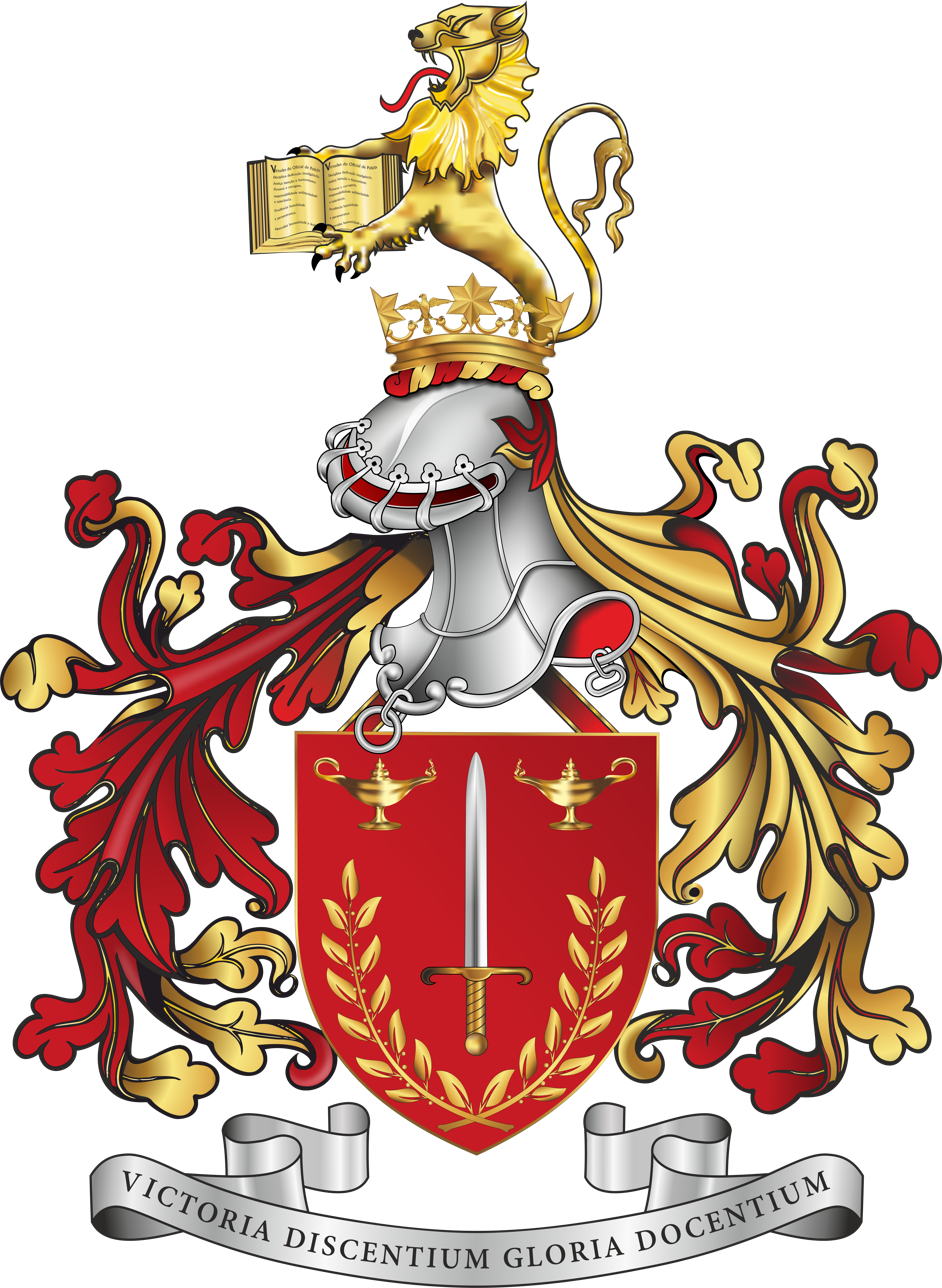
- Former name: Escola Superior de Polícia
- Type: Public university-level police higher education institution
- Established: 15 October 1982
- Parent institution: Polícia de Segurança Pública
- Director: Luís Manuel Peça Farinha
- Location: Lisbon, Portugal; 38.7042213°N 9.1780261°W
- Website: www.iscpsi.pt
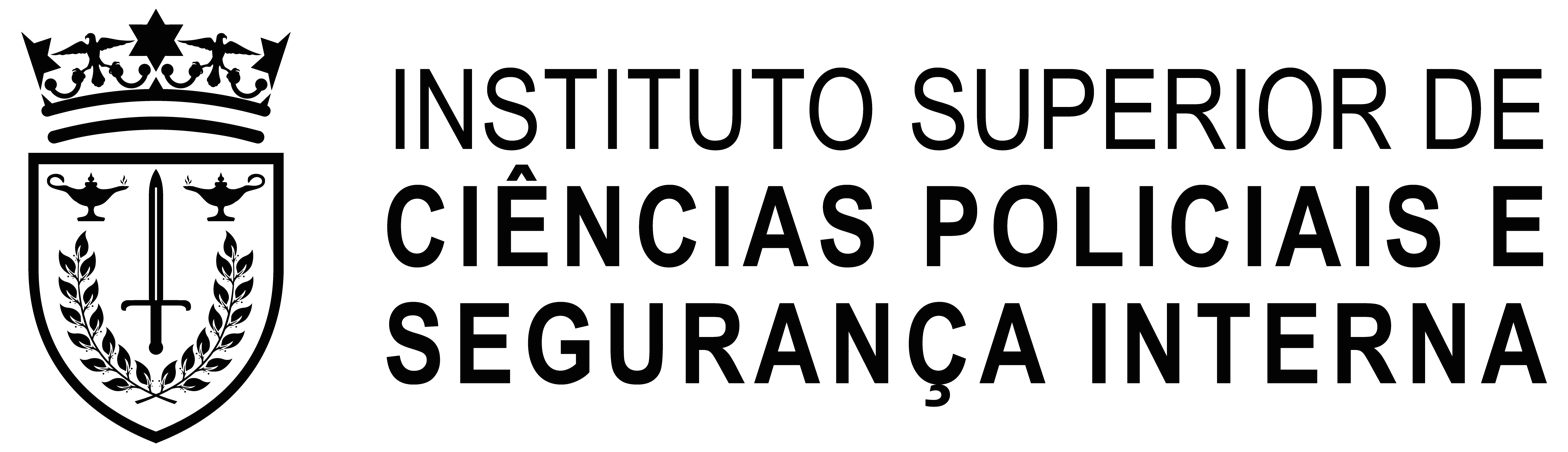

The Instituto Superior de Ciências Policiais e Segurança Interna (ISCPSI, Portuguese for Higher Institute of Police Sciences and Internal Security) is a Portuguese higher education institution, a police university institute or police academy of the Polícia de Segurança Pública (PSP). It is located in Lisbon, Portugal.

== See also ==
- Higher education in Portugal
- Portugal
