= Polytechnic University of Lisbon =

Public technical university in Lisbon, Portugal

- Universidade Politécnica de Lisboa
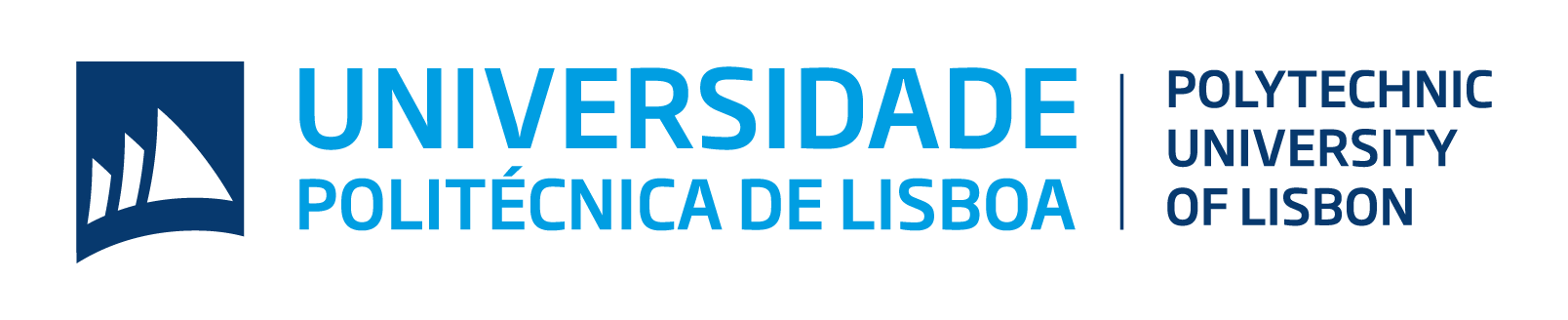
- Other names: Politécnico de Lisboa, UPL
- Type: Public technical university
- Established: 1986; 40 years ago
- President: Elmano Margato
- Students: +13,500
- Location: Lisbon, Portugal
- Campus: Urban
- Language: Portuguese
- Colors: Navy blue and light blue (University)
- Website: ipl.pt/en

The Polytechnic University of Lisbon (UPL; Portuguese: Universidade Politécnica de Lisboa), known until 2026 as the Polytechnic Institute of Lisbon, is a public technical university in Lisbon, Portugal. Established in 1986, it is one of the biggest institutions of its kind in Portugal. The university offers bachelor's (licenciatura), master's (mestrado), and postgraduate (pós-graduação) degrees in the fields of engineering, business administration, health, education, communication, music, film and dance.

== List of schools ==
The Polytechnic University of Lisbon consists of 6 schools and 2 higher education institutes, all of them spread throughout Lisbon. The schools that compose UPL are the following:

=== ISEL - Lisbon School of Engineering ===
The Lisbon School of Engineering (ISEL) is a prestigious public engineering school in eastern Lisbon, Portugal. Founded in 1852, it is one of the oldest and most respected engineering institutions in the country. ISEL offers undergraduate and postgraduate programs in various engineering disciplines, including civil, mechanical, electrical, computer, and chemical engineering.

The school emphasizes practical, hands-on training alongside theoretical knowledge, fostering innovation and technical expertise. ISEL is well-regarded for its research initiatives and strong connections with the engineering industry.

=== ISCAL - Lisbon Accounting and Business School ===
Locations of the UPL campi and schools.

The Lisbon Accounting and Business School (ISCAL) is a renowned public institution in Lisbon specializing in business, accounting, and management education. ISCAL offers undergraduate and postgraduate programs in areas such as accounting, finance, management, and taxation.

Established in 1759, ISCAL is one of the oldest institutions of its kind in Portugal and is recognized for its emphasis on practical, industry-relevant training. It has strong ties with the business community, preparing students for successful careers in the corporate and financial sectors. It is the only school within UPL located in central Lisbon.

== See also ==
- List of colleges and universities in Portugal
- Higher education in Portugal
