= Ordem dos Biólogos =

- Formation: 4 July 1998; 28 years ago
- Headquarters: 38 Rua Cidade de Rabat; Lisbon, Portugal
- Coordinates: 38.747525°N 9.179707°W
- Bastonário (i.e. President): Maria de Jesus Silva Fernandes
- Website: www.ordembiologos.pt

The Ordem dos Biólogos (OdB) is a professional body for biologists, primarily those working in Portugal. The Ordem dos Biólogos is headquartered in Lisbon, and has regional branches in several other cities across Portugal. It was founded on 4 July 1998 by the Decree-Law 183/98. Any citizen with accredited degree and professional activity in biology (or other specific related fields covered by its statutes) within Portugal, is required by law to be affiliated with the Ordem dos Biólogos.

== History ==
The Ordem dos Biólogos is the successor of the Associação Portuguesa de Biólogos (APB) founded on 20 April 1987.

== Role of the Ordem dos Biólogos ==
As the professional body representing biologists, the Ordem dos Biólogos is frequently consulted on biological issues by the Portuguese Government, Parliament of Portugal, higher education institutions, industry and other organisations.

=== Membership ===
There are several grades of membership, depending upon biological qualifications and experience. The main requirements include high level of attainment in biological experience, personal integrity, professional attributes and academic qualifications. In addition, there are student and associate membership grades.

The Member grade is the main professional grade. Members are professional biologists with a standard of academic attainment equivalent to the bachelor's degree (Portugal's licenciatura) level in biological science and with post-graduate responsible experience in biological research or in the teaching or application of biological science. Members are entitled to use the professional title Biologist or related titles like Bioscientist or Biotechnologist.

=== Fellowship ===
Fellowship of the Ordem dos Biólogos is the senior professional grade. Bioscientists who have achieved distinction in biological research or the teaching or application of biological science are eligible.

== Specialized societies ==
The Ordem dos Biólogos has four specialized professional biologists' societies divided in four major fields: environment, biotechnology, education, and human biology and health.

- Colégio do Ambiente
- Colégio da Biotecnologia
- Colégio da Educação
- Colégio da Biologia Humana e Saúde

The main structure also includes the Professional and Deontological Council.

=== Notable members ===
Maria de Jesus Silva Fernandes (president), Jorge Araújo, Maria Amélia Loução

== See also ==
- Ordem dos Advogados
- Ordem dos Engenheiros
- Ordem dos Médicos
