= Instituto Superior de Engenharia de Lisboa =

Polytechnic institution in Lisbon

Lisbon School of Engineering
- Instituto Superior de Engenharia de Lisboa
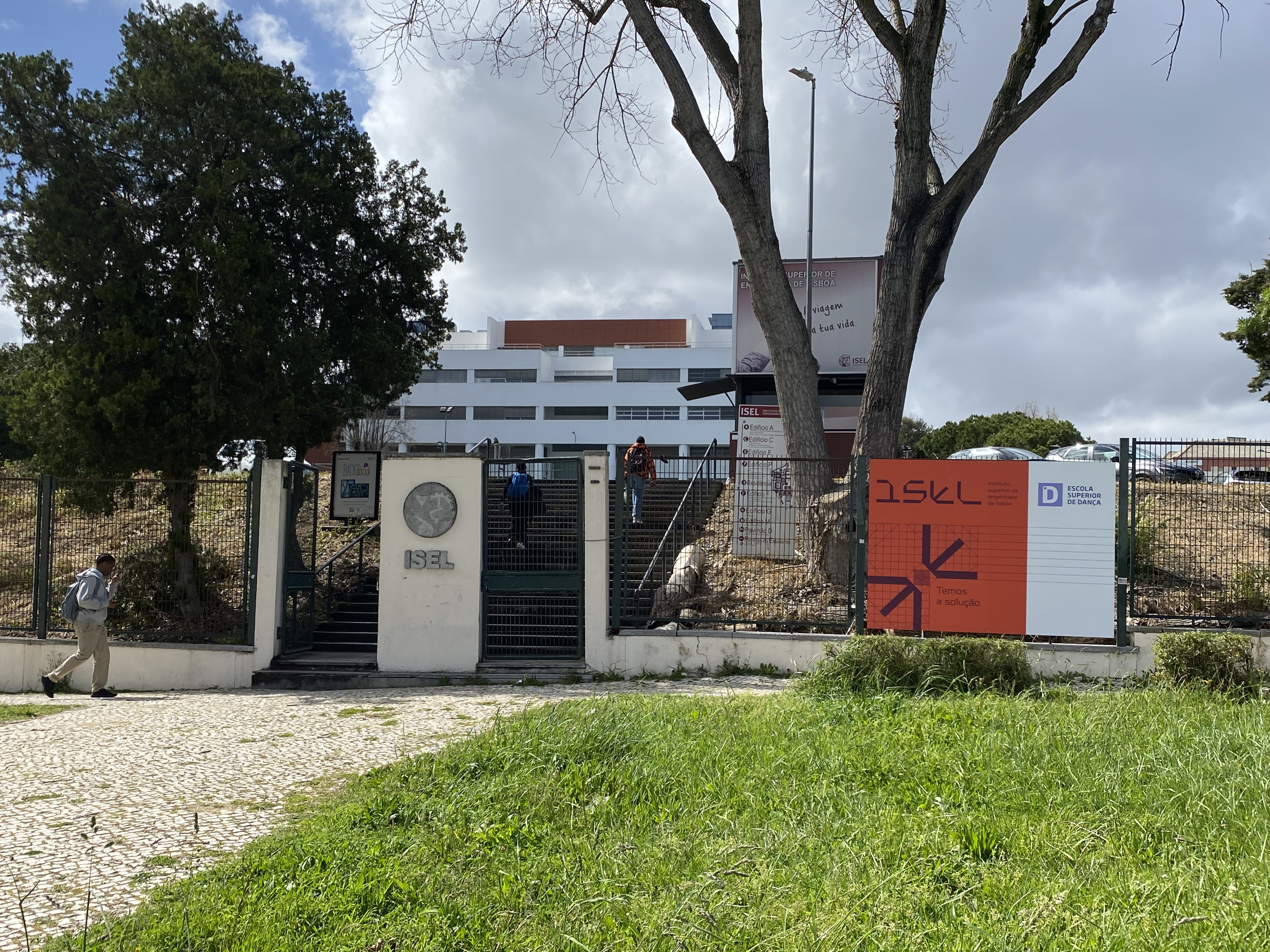
- ISEL Entrance
- Former names: Instituto Industrial de Lisboa (1852–1869, 1918-1974); Instituto Industrial e Comercial de Lisboa (1869–1918)
- Type: Public
- Established: 30 December 1852; 173 years ago
- Parent institution: Polytechnic Institute of Lisbon
- President: José Nascimento
- Location: Marvila, Lisbon, Portugal; 38°45′21″N 9°07′00″W
- Language: Portuguese
- Website: www.isel.pt/en

The Lisbon School of Engineering (ISEL; Portuguese: Instituto Superior de Engenharia de Lisboa) is a Portuguese higher education polytechnic institution of engineering and technology. Headquartered in Lisbon and a part of the Polytechnic Institute of Lisbon.

== See also ==
- List of colleges and universities in Portugal
- Higher education in Portugal
