= Internacional University =

International University (Universidade Internacional) or UI for short, was a Portuguese state-approved and an accredited private research university with facilities in Lisbon and Figueira da Foz, which had been founded in 1984. It was compulsorily closed in 2009 due to the lack of economic and financial viability.

== Inspection and closing ==
In 2007, International University was investigated by Portuguese government higher education authorities (Inspecção-geral (IGES) and Direcção-geral do Ensino Superior (DGES)) in order to clarify several previous reports that raised concerns about the quality and rigour of this and other private institutions. This situation led to the compulsory closing of Universidade Internacional in 2009 by the Portuguese Ministry of Science, Technology and Higher Education (MCTES).

== See also ==
- Diploma mill
- Higher education in Portugal
- list of universities in Portugal
