= Order of Engineers =

- Ordem dos Engenheiros
- Emblem
- Abbreviation: OE
- Established: 1936 (90 years ago)
- Legal status: Active
- Purpose: Professional association, accreditation and licensure
- Headquarters: Lisbon, Portugal
- Region served: Portugal
- Official language: Portuguese
- Bâtonnier: Fernando de Almeida Santos
- Website: www.ordemengenheiros.pt

The Order of Engineers (Note: Portuguese: Ordem dos Engenheiros) (OE), is the regulatory and licensing body for the engineering profession in Portugal. It is headquartered in Lisbon, and has several regional branches in other Portuguese cities.

The OE was established by law in 1936. It succeeded the Portuguese Association of Civil Engineers, founded nearly 70 years earlier. The OE is a member of many international engineering organizations, including general engineering ones (e.g. FEANI) and those for specific engineering disciplines (e.g. ECCE, EUREL, EFCE).

The OE's mission is to contribute to the progress of engineering by supporting the efforts of its members in scientific, professional and social areas, as well as to ensure compliance with professional regulations and ethics.

It is illegal to provide engineering services or sign engineering projects in Portugal without being a member of the OE. However, many other professionals in engineering (such as technical engineers, short-cycle degree engineers, or engineers graduating from unaccredited courses) are allowed to work in the field as long as they do not provide engineering services or sign engineering projects, and they cannot officially use the title "engineer".

The OE is the entity responsible for the accreditation of engineering degrees and engineering courses in Portugal. Engineers graduating with an accredited degree are exempt from the licensing exams conducted by the Order. According to the chairman (Portuguese: bastonário) of the OE, only 30 to 50 percent of the candidates with an unaccredited degree pass the licensing exams, depending on the particular engineering field. Over three hundred engineering degrees are awarded in Portugal by public universities, public polytechnic schools, and private institutions. However, only about one hundred of these are accredited degrees.

== Accreditation ==
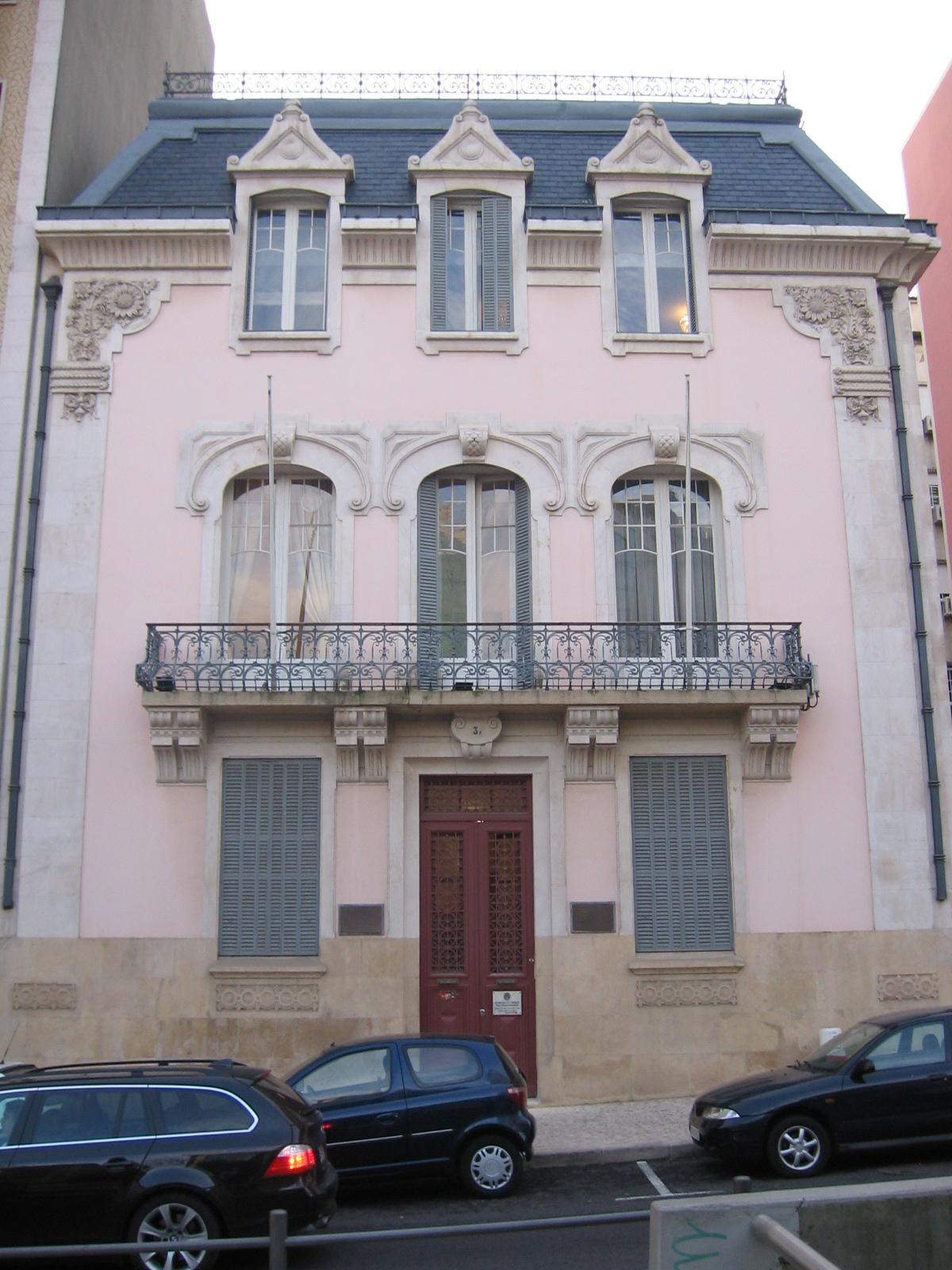
Seat of the Ordem dos Engenheiros, Lisbon

A full chartered engineer (Engenheiro) in Portugal used to have a compulsory five-year course known as licenciatura (licentiate) which was granted exclusively by universities. Only engineers having the licenciatura diploma, graduated at the universities, were capacitated to develop any kind of project in engineering and were universally recognized by the Engineers Association of Portugal (Ordem dos Engenheiros). The polytechnic institutions of engineering, born after 1974, used to award the professional title of Engenheiro Técnico (Technical Engineer), a title conferred after a three years course; the degree was known as bacharelato. Polytechnic institutions conferred 3-years bacharelato degrees in several technical engineering specializations, until the late 1990s. At this time new legal decrees were adopted by Portuguese State (Administrative Rule 413A/98 of 17 July 1998), and it started to award 3 + 2 licenciaturas bietápicas (bacharelato plus one or two extra years, conferring the licenciatura degree - a degree that had been awarded exclusively by the universities). In the mid-2000s those institutions adopted new more selective admission rules which were imposed to every Portuguese higher education institution by the State, excluding for the first time in their history the applicants with negative (less than 95/200) admission marks (in Portugal admission marks to higher education institutions are based on a combination of high school marks, and results of the entrance exams, and competition is based in a numerus clausus system). However, in many cases, polytechnic courses from several institutions across the country, started to require admission entrance exams in fields not directly related with the course (for instance, an electrical engineering or computer engineering course allows a biology entrance exam instead of mathematics and/or physics, unlike what is seen in most universities for the same engineering fields). This is the main reason many engineering courses awarded by several Portuguese polytechnic institutions and a few universities, are not currently accredited by Ordem dos Engenheiros. This is not exclusive of polytechnic engineerings since that in other polytechnic fields, like in polytechnic accountancy and management institutes or schools, history, geography, or even Portuguese language entrance exams are allowed instead of mathematics and economics, unlike what is allowed for the university courses in similar fields, although some departments of certain university institutions are using the same criteria to fight the increasing number of places left vacant every year.

Today, after many reforms and changes in higher education occurred since 1998 to the 2000s, the formal differences between polytechnic and university licenciatura degrees in engineering are in general null, and due to the Bologna process both graduates should be recognized equally all across Europe. However, there are many engineering courses whose degrees are still not recognized by the Ordem dos Engenheiros (the highest Portuguese authority in accreditation of professional engineers), especially engineering courses conferred by several polytechnical institutes and many private institutions. Among the oldest recognized and most extensively accredited engineering courses in Portugal, are those engineering degrees awarded by the state-run universities. After the large 1998 - 2000s reforms and upgrades, some polytechnic engineering licenciatura degrees started to be offered by the largest state-run polytechnic institutes, have been accredited in the same way with official recognition by Ordem dos Engenheiros.

== See also ==
- Educational accreditation
- Higher education in Portugal
- Ordem dos Advogados
- Ordem dos Biólogos
- Ordem dos Engenheiros Técnicos
