= List of people from Lisbon =

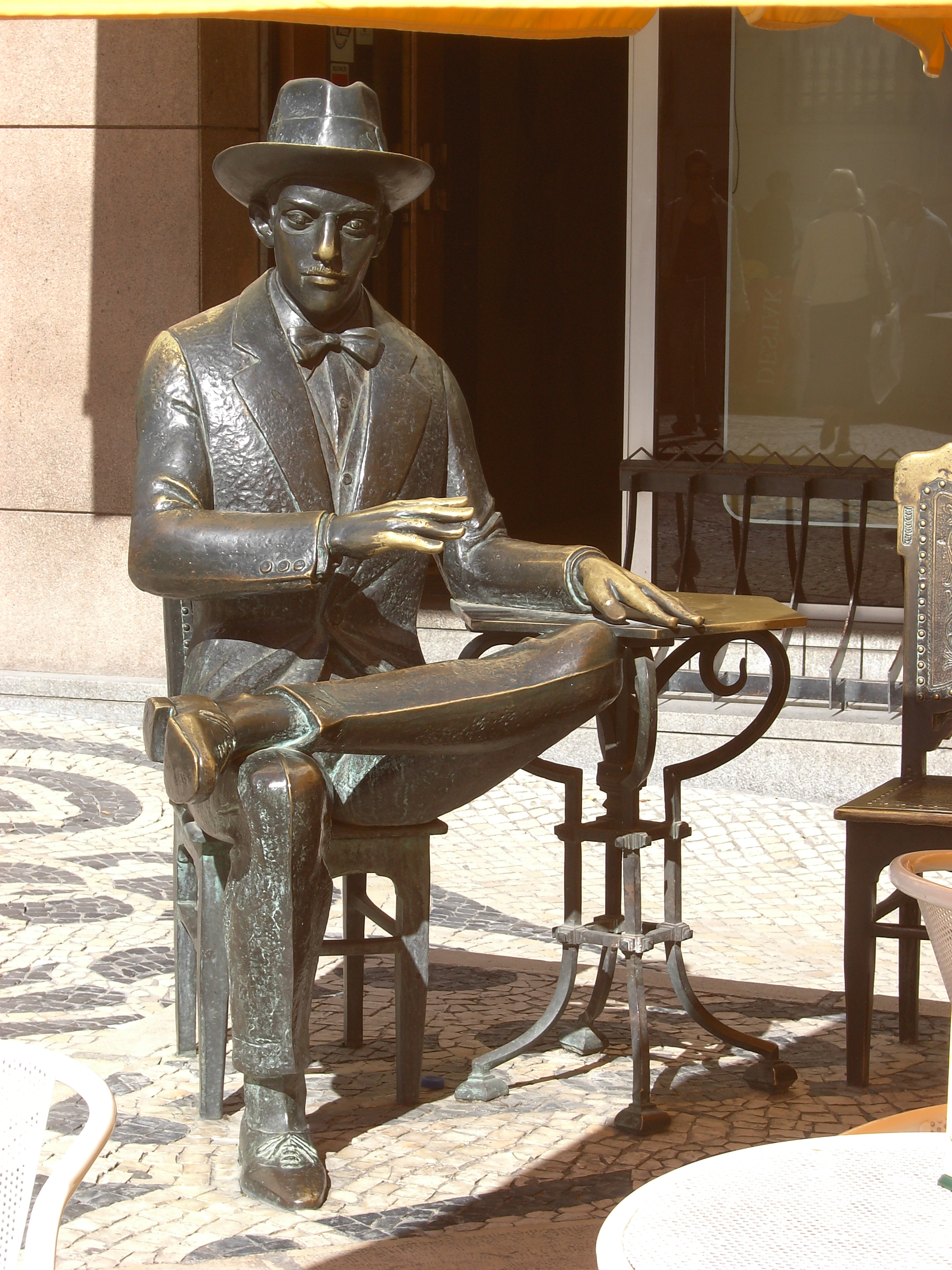
Bronze statue of poet Fernando Pessoa in the Café A Brasileira, in the Chiado neighbourhood

== Early times ==
- Verissimo, Maxima and Julia according to tradition were the first three martyrs of Olisipo, considered native and later also as Romans in the city (3rd and 4th centuries AD)
- São Gens was a legendary bishop-martyr who, according to tradition, has been one of the first bishops of Lisbon, even during the Roman domination of Lusitania
- Fernando Martins de Bulhões, later Saint Anthony of Lisbon (c. 1195–1231) is a Catholic saint
- Pedro Julião, ordained Pope John XXI, (c. 1215–1277), was the only Portuguese-born Pope
- Fernão Lopes (c. 1385–after 1459), chronicler appointed by King Edward of Portugal. Fernão Lopes wrote the history of Portugal, but only a part of his work remained. His way of writing was based on oral discourse, and, on every page, it revealed his roots among the common people. He is one of the fathers of the European historiography, or a precursor of the scientific historiography, basing his works always on the documental proof, and, has he said, on his pages "one cannot find the beauty of words but the nudity of the truth." He was an autodidact

== 15th century ==
- Isaac Abrabanel, Isaac ben Judah Abrabanel (1437–1508), commonly referred to just as Isaac Abrabanel or Isaac Abravanel, was a Portuguese Jewish statesman, notable philosopher, Bible commentator, and financier.
- Francisco de Almeida (c. 1450–1510), nobleman, soldier and explorer, counsellor to King John II of Portugal and the first Viceroy of Portuguese India. Almeida is credited with establishing Portuguese hegemony in the Indian Ocean, with his decisive victory at the naval Battle of Diu in 1509
- Duarte Pacheco Pereira (c. 1460–1533), called "the Great", was a 15th-century sea captain, soldier, explorer and cartographer. He travelled particularly in the central Atlantic Ocean west of the Cape Verde islands, around northern Brazil, in 1498 and before; also along the coast of West Africa and to India. His accomplishments in strategic warfare, exploration, mathematics and astronomy were of an exceptional level. With the anticipation of more than two centuries, he was responsible for calculating the value of the degree of the meridian arc with a margin of error of only 4%
- Duarte Barbosa (c. 1480–1521), writer and navigator; embarked on the first expedition to circumnavigate the world, led by his brother-in-law Ferdinand Magellan.
- João da Nova, Xoán de Novoa or Joam de Nôvoa (c. 1460 in Maceda, Ourense, Galicia (Spain) – 1509 in Kochi, India) was a Galician explorer of the Atlantic and Indian Oceans at the service of Portugal. His skills earned him the appointment by King Manuel I of Portugal as Alcaide menor (mayor) of Lisbon in 1496. He is credited as the discoverer of Ascension and Saint Helena islands. The Juan de Nova Island, in the Mozambique Channel, is named after him. The Farquhar atoll (in the Seychelles) was, for a long time, known as the João da Nova islands.
- António Galvão (c. 1490–1557), soldier and administrator in the Maluku Islands in the Pacific Ocean, and a Renaissance historian, the first to present a comprehensive report of all the leading voyages and explorers up to 1550, either by Portuguese and by other nationalities. His works show a remarkable accuracy, especially the Treaty of Discovery published in Lisbon in 1563 and in English by Richard Hakluyt in 1601.

== 16th century ==
- João de Castro (1500–1548), naval officer, notable scientist, writer and cartographer. He was also the fourth viceroy of Portuguese India. He was called Castro Forte ("Strong Castro") by poet Luís de Camões. He undertook many observations and can in a way be considered as one of the discoverers of crustal magnetism. He also discovered spatial variations of Declination in some points of the globe (as in Baçaim, India), which he attributed to the disturbing effects of underwater rock masses. Castro was one of the most important representative of scientific maritime investigations of the time
- Francisco de Holanda (originally Francisco d'Olanda), (c. 1517–1585), humanist and painter. Considered to be one of the most important figures of the Portuguese Renaissance, he was also an essayist, architect, and historian. He was a maternal nephew of Pope Adrian VI and a remote uncle of Deodoro da Fonseca, Sérgio Buarque de Holanda and his namesake Chico Buarque
- António Ferreira (1528–1569), poet and the foremost representative of the classical school, founded by Francisco de Sá de Miranda. His most considerable work, Castro, is the first tragedy in Portuguese, and the second in modern European literature. known as the Portuguese Horace, he was an ardent defender of the Portuguese language.
- Diogo do Couto (ca.1542–Goa–1616), notable historian who continued the Decades of Asia of the great historian João de Barros. Couto was a close friend of the poet Luís de Camões.

== 17th century ==
- António Vieira (1608–1697), Jesuit and writer, considered the "prince" of pulpit-orators in his time. The honorable and great poet Fernando Pessoa crowned Vieira with the magnificent title of "Emperor of the Portuguese Language"
- João Pinto Ribeiro was a celebrated conjurado and one of the conspirators and planners of the revolution of 1 December 1640.
- Catherine of Braganza (1638–1705), Queen Consort of King Charles II of England
- Saint John de Brito (Portuguese: João de Brito, also spelled "Britto") (1647–died at Oriyur (ஓரியூர்), Tamil Nadu, India, 1693) was a Jesuit missionary and martyr, often called "the Portuguese St. Francis Xavier" by Indian Catholics.
- José da Silva Pais (1679–1760), soldier and colony administrator. He organized the support for the Sacramento Colony during the Spanish–Portuguese War, 1735–1737. For the purpose of maintaining the South of Brazil in the hands of Portugal, Pais was charged with the colonization and construction of many villages and Fortresses like the Jesus Maria e José and others in Rio Grande do Sul and Santa Catarina
- Sebastião José de Carvalho e Melo, 1st Count of Oeiras, 1st Marquess of Pombal (Marquês de Pombal,; 1699–1782) was an 18th-century statesman in the Age of Enlightenment. He was Minister of the Kingdom in the government of Joseph I of Portugal from 1750 to 1777. Undoubtedly the most prominent minister in the government, he is considered today to have been the de facto head of government. Pombal is notable for his swift and competent leadership in the aftermath of the 1755 Lisbon earthquake

== 18th century ==
- Leonor de Almeida Portugal (1750–1839), Marchioness of Alorna, 8th Countess of Assumar, one of the greatest figures of Portuguese literature, known as Alcippe, and the most famous holder of the title
- Carlos Frederico Lecor (1764–1836), general and politician. He was the first Baron of Laguna, in Portugal, and later Viscount of Laguna in Brazil. The only non-British General to have commanded one of the Anglo-Portuguese divisions of Wellington's Peninsular Army (the seventh, in late 1813), as well as having commanded the Portuguese Luso-Brazilian forces who invaded the Banda Oriental del Uruguay (Eastern Bank of Uruguay) in 1816.
- António José de Souza Manoel de Menezes Severim de Noronha (1792–1860), 7th Count of Vila Flor, 1st Marquis of Vila Flor and 1st Duke of Terceira, was a military officer, statesman and a leader of the Constitutionalist side in the Liberal Wars, as well as a Prime Minister of Portugal

== 19th century ==
- Alexandre Herculano (Alexandre Herculano de Carvalho e Araújo; (1810–1877 in Santarém), novelist and historian
- Camilo Castelo Branco (Camilo Ferreira Botelho Castelo-Branco, 1st Viscount de Correia Botelho; (1825 –1890), prolific and notable writer, having authored over 260 books (mainly novels, plays and essays). His writing is, overall, considered original in that it combines the dramatic and sentimental spirit of Romanticism with a highly personal combination of bitterness, dark humour of sarcasm
- Cesário Verde (1855–1886), poet. His work, while mostly ignored during his lifetime, is generally considered to be amongst the most important in Portuguese poetry and is widely taught in schools. This is partly due to his being championed by many other authors after his death, notably Fernando Pessoa
- Lucinda do Carmo (1861–1922), actress and poet
- Henrique Mitchell de Paiva Couceiro (1861–1944), son of a Portuguese father and an Irish mother, was a soldier, colonial governor, monarchist politician and counter-revolutionary; he was notable for his role during the colonial occupation of Angola and Mozambique and for his dedication to the monarchist cause during the period of the First Portuguese Republic
- Gago Coutinho or Carlos Viegas Gago Coutinho (1869–1959), aviation pioneer who, together with Sacadura Cabral (1881–1924), was the first to cross the South Atlantic Ocean by air, from March to June 1922 (some sources wrongly claim 1919), from Lisbon to Rio de Janeiro. Gago Coutinho invented a type of sextant incorporating two spirit levels to provide an artificial horizon. This adaptation of the traditional marine sextant allowed navigation without visual reference to the real horizon.
- Sime Seruya (1876–1955), actress, suffragist and socialist who campaigned in Britain.
- Fernando Pessoa (1888–1935), poet, writer, literary critic and translator, considered one of the most significant literary figures of the 20th century
- Sarah Affonso (1899–1983), modernist painter and illustrator remembered for rural scenes and portraits of peasant women
- Raquel Gameiro (1889–1970), watercolour painter and illustrator or books, newspapers and magazines
- Mário de Sá-Carneiro (1890–1916), poet and writer. He is one of the most well known of the "Geração D'Orpheu" and friend of Fernando Pessoa and Almada Negreiros

== 20th century ==
- Margarida de Abreu (1915–2006), choreographer, responsible for the introduction of Ballet school in Portugal
- Amália Rodrigues (1920–1999), the Rainha do Fado (Queen of Fado), influential in popularizing the fado worldwide
- Jorge Ferreira Chaves (1920–1982), architect
- Mário Cesariny (1923–2006), surrealist poet, a minor painter
- Alexandre O'Neill (1924–1986), poet/writer
- Mário Soares (1924–2017), politician, 17th president and 53rd/60th prime ministers of Portugal
- Paula Rego (c. 1935–2022), painter, illustrator and printmaker
- Jorge Sampaio (1939–2021), politician, United Nations High Commissioner for the Alliance of Civilizations, former mayor of Lisbon and 18th president of Portugal
- Michael Breisky (born 1940 in Lisbon), Austrian diplomat, globalization critic, and the author of numerous publications on Leopold Kohr and his teaching
- Gonçalo Byrne (born c. 1941), architect
- António Lobo Antunes (1942–2026), writer and psychiatrist
- António Damásio (born c. 1944), neuroscientist
- António Guterres (born 1949), United Nations High Commissioner for Refugees, 62nd prime minister of Portugal, Secretary-General of the United Nations
- José Manuel Durão Barroso (born 1956), President of the European Commission, 63rd prime minister of Portugal
- Joaquim de Almeida (born 1957), actor
- Carlos Tavares (born 1958), former automotive business executive
- António Costa (born 1961), 119th prime minister of Portugal, first one of Goan Konkani ancestry
- José Mourinho (born 1963), football manager
- Luís Figo (born 1972), football player
- P. J. Marcellino (born 1978), film director, film producer, journalist
- Hugo Mikal Skår (1978), actor
- Ana Sofia Antunes (born 1981), politician
- Diogo Amaral (1981), actor
- Manuel João Ramos (born 1960), anthropologist and civil rights advocate
- Maria Esteves de Medeiros Victorino de Almeida (born 1965), actress, director, and singer

== 21st century ==
- Kika Nazareth (born 2002), footballer for the Portugal national team
- Nuno Mendes (born 2002), footballer for the Portugal national team

== See also ==
- Category:People from Lisbon
