= Luso-Afro-Brazilian Congress of Social Sciences =

Social science convention for Lusosphere topics

Luso-Afro-Brazilian Congress of Social Sciences Congresso Luso-Afro-Brasileiro de Ciências Sociais
- Nickname: CONLAB
- Frequency: Roughly biennial
- Inaugurated: July 2, 1990; 36 years ago
- Previous event: September 26, 2023; 3 years ago

The Luso-Afro-Brazilian Congress of Social Sciences (Congresso Luso-Afro-Brasileiro de Ciências Sociais, CONLAB) is a roughly biennial conference that focuses on social science topics relating to countries in the Lusophere. The event was first held at the University of Coimbra in Portugal in 1990, but has since then been held in other countries such as Brazil, Mozambique, and Angola. The latest CONLAB was held in 2023 at the University of Cape Verde.

== Format ==
The conference is held at different institutions in Portuguese-speaking counties on a roughly biennial basis. The goal of CONLAB is to provide social scientists and other academics from Portuguese-speaking countries (Note: That is Angola, Brazil, Cape Verde, Guinea-Bissau, Mozambique, Portugal, São Tomé and Príncipe, and Timor Leste) with a platform to present their research. The conference also emphasizes the development and promotion of interdisciplinary and transnational research on topics relating to the entire Lusosphere.

== Conferences ==
As of the latest conference, CONLAB XV, CONLAB has been held in Portugal 7 times, Brazil 5 times, and in African countries (Mozambique, Angola, and Cape Verde) 3 times.

Event dates, locations, and themes
Event	Dates	Location	Theme	Ref.
I CONLAB	2 - 5 July 1990	Centre for Social Studies at the University of Coimbra (Portugal)	Saber e Imaginar o Social: Desafios às Ciências Sociais de Língua Portuguesa (Knowing and Imagining the Social: Challenges for Portuguese-speaking Social Sciences)	
II CONLAB	August 1, 1992	Faculty of Philosophy, Languages and Human Sciences at the University of São Paulo (Brazil)	Vontade de Saber, Desejo de Poder: A Modernidade dos Povos de Língua Portuguesa posta em questão (Will to Know, Desire for Power: The Modernity of Portuguese-speaking Peoples called into question)	
III CONLAB	4 - 7 July 1994	Institute of Social Sciences at the University of Lisbon (Portugal)	Dinâmicas Culturais: novas faces, outros olhares (Cultural dynamics: new faces, new perspectives)	
IV CONLAB	1 - 5 September 1996	Institute of Philosophy and Social Sciences at the Federal University of Rio de Janeiro (Brazil)	Territórios da Língua Portuguesa – Culturas, Sociedades e Políticas no Mundo Contemporâneo (Territories of the Portuguese Language – Cultures, Societies and Politics in the Contemporary World)	
V CONLAB	1 - 5 September 1998	Eduardo Mondlane University (Mozambique)	– (Note: There was no theme at this year's conference.)	
VI CONLAB	5 - 9 September 2000	Faculty of Arts and Humanities at the University of Porto (Portugal)	As Ciências Sociais nos espaços de língua portuguesa: balanços e desafios (Social Sciences in Portuguese-speaking countries: balances and challenges	
VII CONLAB	2 - 6 September 2002	Instituto Universitário de Pesquisas do Rio de Janeiro at the Universidade Candido Mendes (Brazil)	As Linguagens da Lusofonia (The languages of the Lusofonia)	
VIII CONLAB	16 - 18 September 2004	Centre for Social Studies at the University of Coimbra (Portugal)	A questão social no novo milénio (Social issues in the new millennium)	
IX CONLAB	28 - 30 November 2006	Agostinho Neto University (Angola)	Dinâmicas, mudanças e desenvolvimento no século XXI (Dynamics, change and development in the 21st century)	
X CONLAB	4 - 7 February 2009	University of Minho (Portugal)	Sociedades Desiguais e Paradigmas em Confronto (Unequal Societies and Confronting Paradigms)	
XI CONLAB	7 - 10 August 2011	Federal University of Bahia (Brazil)	Diversidades e (Des)Igualdades (Diversities and (In)Equalities)	
XII CONLAB	2 - 5 February 2015	Faculty of Social and Human Sciences at the NOVA University Lisbon (Portugal)	Imaginar e Repensar o Social: Desafios às Ciências Sociais em Língua Portuguesa, 25 anos depois (Imagining and Rethinking the Social: Challenges for the Social Sciences in Portuguese, 25 years on)	
XIII CONLAB	17 - 20 December 2018	School of Philosophy, Letters and Human Sciences at the Federal University of São Paulo (Brazil)	Diásporas e o Diálogo Sul-Sul: descolonizando as Ciências Sociais e Humanas (Diasporas and South-South Dialogue: decolonizing the Social Sciences and Humanities)	
XIV CONLAB	15 - 17 September 2021	Centre for Social Studies at the University of Coimbra (Portugal)	Utopias pós-crise. Artes e saberes em movimento (Post-crisis utopias. Arts and knowledge on the move)	
XV CONLAB	26 - 28 September 2023	University of Cape Verde (Cape Verde)	Reinventando a Democracia num Mundo de Inseguranças: Desafios para as Ciências Sociais e Humanas (Reinventing Democracy in a World of Insecurity: Challenges for the Social Sciences and Humanities)	

=== Additional information ===
The 1st CONLAB, I CONLAB, happened in 1990 at the Centre for Social Studies of the University of Coimbra and was done in conjunction with the festivities for the institution's 700th anniversary. The theme for this year was "Saber e Imaginar o Social: Desafios às Ciências Sociais de Língua Portuguesa" (Knowing and Imagining the Social: Challenges for Portuguese-speaking Social Sciences). The event was intended to encourage social scientists and academics from the Lusosphere to form deeper connections with one another.

The 2nd CONLAB, II CONLAB, happened in 1992 at the Faculty of Philosophy, Languages and Human Sciences at the University of São Paulo. The theme for this year was "Vontade de Saber, Desejo de Poder: A Modernidade dos Povos de Língua Portuguesa posta em questão" (Will to Know, Desire for Power: The Modernity of Portuguese-speaking Peoples called into question). This conference offered courses in African, Brazilian, and Portuguese culture. This was the first CONLAB to be held in Brazil.

The 3rd CONLAB, III CONLAB, happened in 1994 at the Institute of Social Sciences at the University of Lisbon. The theme for this year was "Dinâmicas Culturais: novas faces, outros olhares" (Cultural dynamics: new faces, new perspectives) and the conference primarily dealt with topics relating to multiculturalism and social science's role in multicultural societies.

The 4th CONLAB, IV CONLAB, happened in 1996 at the Institute of Philosophy and Social Sciences at the Federal University of Rio de Janeiro. The theme for this year was "Territórios da Língua Portuguesa – Culturas, Sociedades e Políticas no Mundo Contemporâneo" (Territories of the Portuguese Language – Cultures, Societies and Politics in the Contemporary World). The creation of a designated planning body, the Associação Luso-Afro-Brasileira de Ciências Sociais (Luso-Afro-Brazilian Association of Social Sciences), was also discussed at this conference in order to organize future conferences and explore the possibility of publishing a journal.

The 5th CONLAB, V CONLAB, happened in 1998 at the Eduardo Mondlane University in Mozambique and was the first CONLAB to be held in an African country. The conference covered various themes such as societal safety, new democracies, and the role of the arts in society. The Associação de Ciências Sociais e Humanas em Língua Portuguesa (Portuguese Language Social Sciences and Humanities Association, ACSHELP) and its journal Travessias were created at this conference.

The 6th CONLAB, VI CONLAB, happened in 2000 at the School of Philosophy, Letters and Human Sciences at the University of Porto. The theme for this year was "As Ciências Sociais nos espaços de língua portuguesa: balanços e desafios" (Social Sciences in Portuguese-speaking countries: balances and challenges.

The 7th CONLAB, VII CONLAB, happened in 2002 at the Instituto Universitário de Pesquisas do Rio de Janeiro at the Universidade Candido Mendes. The theme for this year was "As Linguagens da Lusofonia" (The languages of the Lusofonia) and was chosen to bring attention to the diversity of the different varieties of Portuguese spoken in countries across the Lusosphere. It was decided at this conference to create a permanent commission for the conference as a more flexible alternative to the ACSHELP for future event planning and publication of the Travessias journal.

The 8th CONLAB, VIII CONLAB, happened in 2004 at the Centre for Social Studies at the University of Coimbra. The theme for this year was "A questão social no novo milénio" (Social issues in the new millennium). Despite publications of the Travessias journal coinciding with the biennial conferences, the planning commission for the VII CONLAB was not able to publish in time for this conference due to an inability to find sponsors.

The 9th CONLAB, IX CONLAB, happened in 2006 at the Agostinho Neto University in Angola. The theme for this year was "Dinâmicas, mudanças e desenvolvimento no século XXI" (Dynamics, change and development in the 21st century) with the focus being on developing individualized solutions to issues faced by all the Lusophone countries.

The 10th CONLAB, X CONLAB, happened in 2009 at the University of Minho. The theme for this year was "Sociedades Desiguais e Paradigmas em Confronto" (Unequal Societies and Confronting Paradigms). This event was attended by over 1500 academics.

The 11th CONLAB, XI CONLAB, happened in 2011 at the Federal University of Bahia. The theme for this year was Diversidades e (Des)Igualdades (Diversities and (In)Equalities). The focus of this event was on mental health and analysis of the different kinds of diversity seen in different countries. 2000 works were presented by academics over the course of the conference.

The 12th CONLAB, XII CONLAB, happened in 2015 at the Faculty of Social and Human Sciences at the NOVA University Lisbon. The theme for this year was "Imaginar e Repensar o Social: Desafios às Ciências Sociais em Língua Portuguesa, 25 anos depois" (Imagining and Rethinking the Social: Challenges for the Social Sciences in Portuguese, 25 years on). The focus of the event was to reflect on the progress achieved in the time since the first convention in 1990. The first Associação Internacional de Ciências Sociais e Humanas em Língua Portuguesa (International Association of the Portuguese Language Social and Human Sciences, AILPcsh) conference was held in conjunction with XII CONLAB.

The 13th CONLAB, XIII CONLAB, happened in 2018 at the School of Philosophy, Letters and Human Sciences at the Federal University of São Paulo. The theme for this year was "Diásporas e o Diálogo Sul-Sul: descolonizando as Ciências Sociais e Humanas" (Diasporas and South-South Dialogue: decolonizing the Social Sciences and Humanities). The focus of the event was to promote perspectives from the Global South, which are often neglected but are crucial in understanding the complexities of global issues. The second AILPcsh conference was held in conjunction with XIII CONLAB.

The 14th CONLAB, XIV CONLAB, happened in 2021 at the Centre for Social Studies at the University of Coimbra. The event was intended to be held in 2020 to commemorate the 30 year anniversary of the conference, but was delayed due to the COVID-19 pandemic. The theme for this year was "Utopias pós-crise. Artes e saberes em movimento" (Post-crisis utopias. Arts and knowledge on the move) and the focus of the event was to identify new approaches to deal with the conflict, discrimination, and inequality present in contemporary society. The third AILPcsh conference was held in conjunction with XIV CONLAB.

The 15th CONLAB, XV CONLAB, happened in 2023 at the University of Cape Verde. The theme for this year was "Reinventando a Democracia num Mundo de Inseguranças: Desafios para as Ciências Sociais e Humanas" (Reinventing Democracy in a World of Insecurity: Challenges for the Social Sciences and Humanities). Some of the topics addressed at the conference were resistance to neoconservatism, maintaining democracy in the face of violent conflicts, and addressing the inequalities faced in contemporary society. The conference was attended by at least 284 academics from 16 different countries. The fourth AILPcsh conference was held in conjunction with XV CONLAB.

The 16th CONLAB, XVI CONLAB, and fifth AILPcsh conference will be held in 2025.

== Developments ==
The Associação Internacional de Ciências Sociais e Humanas em Língua Portuguesa (International Association of the Portuguese Language Social and Human Sciences, AILPcsh) was created during XI CONLAB and officially registered as an organization on 2 March 2012. Their primary objective is in organizing future CONLABs and deepening connections between institutions and researchers in the lusosphere.

The journal Travessias was created in 1998 at Eduardo Mondlane University in Mozambique during V CONLAB. At its inception, the journal was edited by different academic institutions in Portuguese-speaking countries and usually published biennially. The journal covers social sciences and the humanities in the Lusosphere with a focus on interdisciplinary research. The journal is currently operated and published by the AILPcsh.

In addition to an association and journal, the conference has led to the creation of several exchange programs and scholarships for university students.

== See also ==
- Community of Portuguese Language Countries – International organization for fostering collaboration between Portuguese-speaking countries
- Lusosphere – Countries where the official language is Portuguese
