= Puga =

Puga is a Spanish surname. Notable people with this surname include:

- Amalia Puga de Losada (1866–1963), Peruvian writer
- Antonio de Puga (1602–1648), Spanish painter
- Arturo Puga (1879–1970), Chilean military officer
- Benoît Puga (born 1953), French general
- Bertha Puga Martínez (1909–2007), Colombian first lady
- Héctor Pablo Ramírez Puga (born 1967), Mexican politician
- Manuel Maria Puga y Parga (1874–1918), Spanish chef
- María Luisa Puga (1944–2004), Mexican writer
- Rogerio Miguel Puga (born 1974), Portuguese academic
- Yoandir Puga (born 1988), Cuban footballer

== See also ==
- PuGa, Plutonium–gallium alloy
