= Instituto de Estudos Medievais =

The Instituto de Estudos Medievais (IEM, Institute for Medieval Studies) is a centre for advanced research on medieval studies attached to the Faculty of Social and Human Sciences (FCSH) of Universidade Nova de Lisboa, in Portugal. Founded in 2002 by Portuguese medieval historians Luis Krus and José Mattoso, the IEM is one of the largest centres of its kind in the Portuguese and Spanish-speaking world and the largest in Portugal.

The IEM emphasizes a strong collaborative and interdisciplinary tradition, spanning history, archaeology, medieval languages (including Arabic), art history, manuscript studies and musicology. The centre's research and teaching activities focus primarily on the society, culture, and institutions of the westernmost region of the Iberian Peninsula between 700 and 1500, and its framing in the wider backdrop of Europe.

== Governance ==
The IEM's internal structure resembles that of most academic research institutions in Portugal. It is modeled on guidelines set by the Portuguese Science Foundation (FCT). The centre is overseen by a steering committee that is chaired by Maria João Branco, and advised by a general assembly and an external audit commission.

It is divided into two broad research clusters that together reflect the centre's current research rationale:

- Images, texts and representations
- Territories and powers: A global perspective. The IEM's core membership includes more than forty integrated researchers in addition to dozens of associated researchers, whose primary affiliations are NOVA and similar academic institutions.

== Activities ==
Activities revolve around advanced research in medieval studies in the form of individual and collaborative projects. Annually since 2001 the IEM has published the peer-reviewed e-journal Medievalista Online, as well as a book series on medieval topics in Portuguese, French and English. IEM has often been a partner to public institutions in Portugal for activities such as the curation of exhibitions. The centre provides undergraduate and advanced teaching for NOVA, and it has begun to award and administer graduate scholarships.

== Directors ==
- Luís Krus†, 2002–2005
- Bernardo de Vasconcelos e Sousa, 2006–2008
- Maria de Lurdes Rosa, 2008–2011
- Amélia Aurora Aguiar Andrade, 2011–2016
- Maria João Branco, 2016–present
