= Adriano Duarte Rodrigues =

Portuguese academic

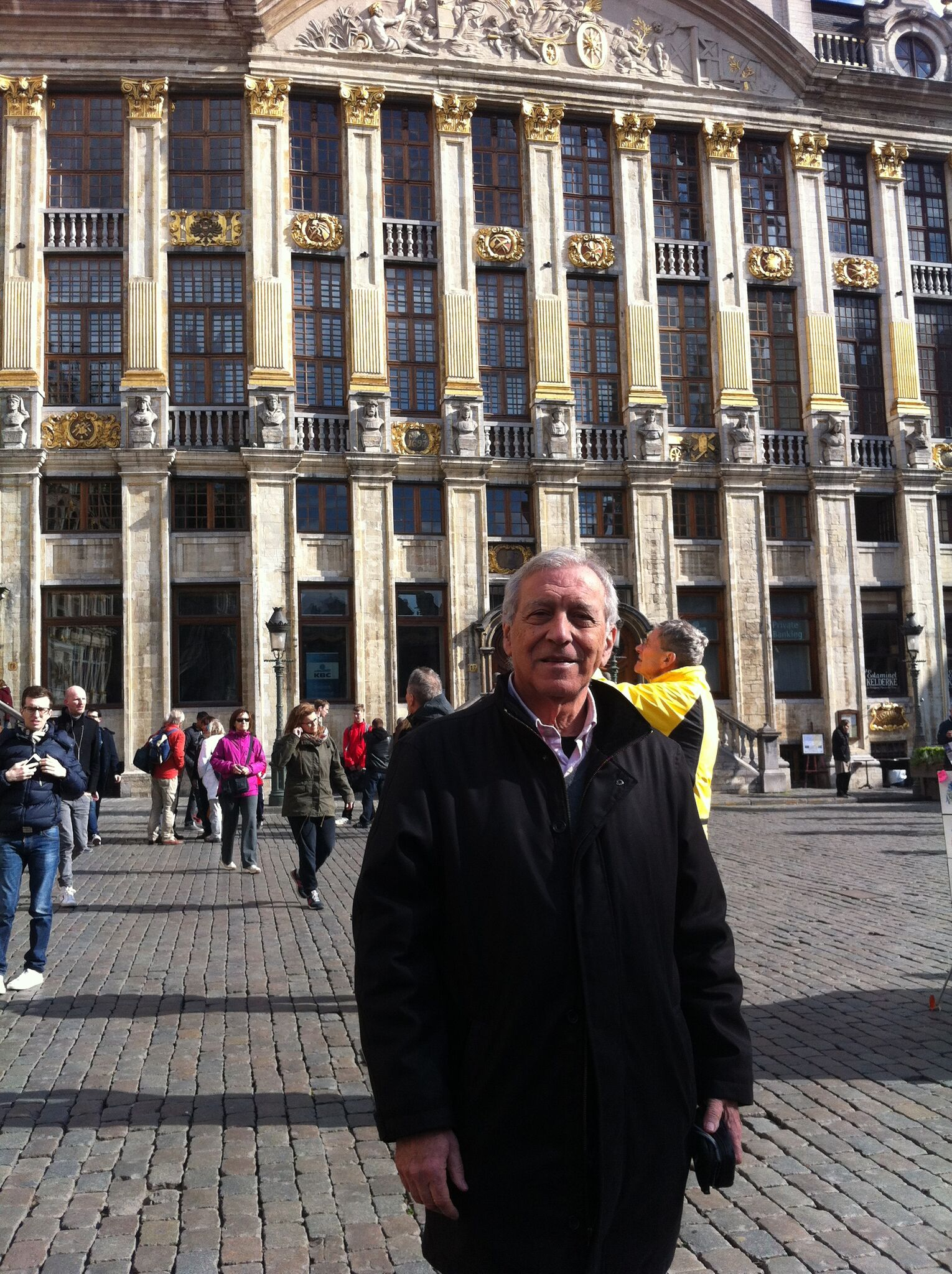
- Born: April 7, 1942 (age 84); Lisbon, Portugal
- Occupation: professor
- Years active: 1977-2012
- Known for: communication theory
- Notable work: Cultura e Comunicação, A Partitura Invisível

Adriano Duarte Rodrigues (born 7 April 1942) is a Portuguese communication theorist. As an assistant professor of the Faculty of Social and Human Sciences (Faculdade de Ciências Sociais e Humanas, or FCSH) of the Universidade Nova de Lisboa, he created Portugal's first communications department and undergraduate degree.

Duarte Rodrigues advocated a theoretical approach to communication studies, rather than teaching specific techniques of journalism. He was named an extraordinary professor in 1979 and a full professor in 1980. He served as the college's director from 1988 to 1993 and the university's associate dean from 2001 to 2002, retiring and becoming a professor emeritus in 2012. A Festschrift in Duarte Rodrigues' honor, titled Comunicação e linguagens: Novas Convergências ("Communication and Languages: New Convergences"), was released in December 2015.

== Biography ==
Adriano Duarte Rodrigues was born in Lisbon, Portugal on 7 April 1942, to Silvina Duarte de Candida Rodrigues and Josè Rodrigues. As a young man, Duarte Rodrigues attended the University of Strasbourg, where he received degrees in theology (1968) and sociology (1970). He supported himself during his education by working in a bank and then in a bottling plant. From 1971 to 1977, he was an assistant professor at the Université catholique de Louvain, obtaining his PhD in his final year there.

Immediately after graduating, Duarte Rodrigues was hired as assistant professor at the FCSH of the Universidade Nova de Lisboa, where he founded the Communication Department. In 1979, the college named him an extraordinary professor, and in 1980, he became a full professor. Duarte Rodrigues served as the director of the FSCH from 1988 to 1993 and associate dean of the university from 2001 to 2002. From 2002 to 2005, he chaired the college's Scientific Council. He serves on the editorial boards of the journals Contemporânea, Em Questão, Fronteiras, Communicare, Conexão, and Rastros, and has been a visiting researcher at the School for Advanced Studies in the Social Sciences (Paris), the University of Brasília and the Federal University of Pará.

Duarte Rodrigues retired in April 2012. On 15 November 2012, he gave his last lecture at UNL, titled "Acerca das regras da sociabilidade" ("On the Rules of Socialability"). In May 2014, he was the keynote speaker for the Cumulus Conference of the University of Aveiro. Speaking to journalists later the same year, he criticized the Portuguese national exam for a linguistically confused question, calling it "huge nonsense". A Festschrift in Duarte Rodrigues' honor, titled Comunicação e linguagens: Novas Convergências ("Communication and Languages: New Convergences"), was released in December 2015.

Duarte Rodrigues and Christiane H.M.N. Arnold (b. 1949) have two children, Pierre (b. 1971) and Cécile Rodrigues (b. 1972).

== Approach to communication theory ==
Duarte Rodrigues' areas of study include communication theory, pragmatics, interaction discourse, and conversation analysis.

In the 1960s and '70s, Portuguese universities had yet to follow the lead of most other Western European countries in establishing communications departments. When Duarte Rodrigues founded the FCSH communication program in 1979, it was the first in the nation to offer an undergraduate degree in the subject. Duarte Rodrigues' program emphasized theoretical approaches, in contrast to the then-dominant American model of emphasizing practical journalism. The program offered a five-year degree, with coursework equally split between the liberal arts and communication theory. As Peter Simonson and David W. Park write in their International History of Communication Study, "Only two units were dedicated to journalistic techniques, which frustrated the expectations of the journalistic community that considered the new degree mocked the profession for not paying any significant attention to its practices." In 1984, FCSH became the first school in Portugal to offer a Master's degree in communications.

Duarte Rodrigues is a skeptic of the related discipline of media studies, writing that:

Communication studies that claim to have the media as an object, but that ignore this feature, do not have, therefore, the media as an object of study, but other issues that have nothing to do with the media, but with particular issues that have to do with the functioning of society, such as power, social inequalities, and certain stereotypes, such as racism, sexism, violence. [These studies are] based on the assumption that these issues depend on the functioning of the media, as if the functioning of the media was an external reality to the experience of the world and society that invented and uses them. The media of enunciation devices have influence on our behavior and have power, but this influence and this power escape our perception and therefore we are unable to discern, as they coincide with the experience that we ourselves represented. (Note: Original Portuguese text: "Os estudos de comunicação que pretendem ter as mídias como objeto, mas que ignoram esta característica não têm, por conseguinte, as mídias como objeto de estudo, mas outras questões que não têm propriamente nada a ver com as mídias, mas com questões particulares que têm a ver com o funcionamento da sociedade, tais como o poder, as desigualdades sociais, determinados estereótipos, tais como o racismo, o sexismo, a violência. Partem do pressuposto de que estas questões dependem do funcionamento das mídias, como se o funcionamento das mídias fosse uma realidade exterior à própria experiência do mundo própria da sociedade que as inventou e que as utiliza. Os dispositivos midiáticos da enunciação têm influência sobre os nossos comportamentos e têm poder, mas essa influência e esse poder escapam à nossa percepção e, por isso, somos incapazes de os discernir, uma vez que coincidem com a própria experiência que nós próprios constituímos.")

In 2014, Duarte Rodrigues and co-author Adriana Aranade Braga endorsed an ethnomethodological approach to discourse analysis.

== Books ==
- O Campo dos Media ("The Field of Media"). Lisbon: Vega, 1985.
- Estratégias da Comunicação. Questão Comunicacional e Formas de Sociabilidade ("Communication Strategies: Communication Questions and Forms of Sociability"). Lisbon: Presence, 1990.
- Introdução à Semiótica ("Introduction to Semiotics"). Lisbon: Presence, 1991.
- Cultura e Comunicação. A Experiência Cultural na Era da Informação ("Culture and Communication: the Cultural Experience in the Information Age"). Lisbon: Presence, 1994.
- As Dimensões da Pragmática na Comunicação ("The Pragmatic Dimensions of Communication"). Rio de Janeiro: Diadorim, 1995.
- Dimensões Pragmáticas do Sentido ("Pragmatic Dimensions of Sense"). Lisbon: Cosmos, 1996.
- As Técnicas da Comunicação e da Informação ("Technical Communication and Information"). Lisbon: Presence, 1999.
- Dicionário Breve da Comunicação e da Informação ("Brief Dictionary of Communication and Information"). Lisbon: Presence, 2000.
- A Partitura Invisível. Para uma Abordagem Interactiva da Linguagem ("The Invisible Score: Toward an Interactive Approach to Language"). Lisbon: Colibri, 2001.
