= Benjamín Hernández Silva =

Mexican politician

- Born: 16 June 1946 (age 79); Oaxaca, Mexico
- Occupation: Politician
- Political party: PRD

Benjamín Hernández Silva (born 16 June 1946) is a Mexican politician affiliated with the Party of the Democratic Revolution (PRD). In the 2006 general election he was elected to the Chamber of Deputies to represent the tenth district of Oaxaca during the 60th Congress. His substitute, elected on the same ticket as him, was Aída Fabiola Valencia Ramírez, who was later returned for the same district in the 2012 general election.

He previously served as a local deputy in the 55th and 59th sessions of the Congress of Oaxaca (1992–1995 and 2004–2006).
