= Do Carmo =

Do Carmo is a surname. Notable people with the surname include:

- Allan do Carmo (born 1989), Brazilian swimmer
- Carlos do Carmo (1939–2021), Portuguese fado singer
- Chiquito do Carmo (born 1986), East Timorese footballer
- Gabriel do Carmo (born 1990), Brazilian footballer
- Isabel do Carmo (born 1940), Portuguese revolutionary
- Lucília do Carmo (1919–1998), Portuguese fado singer
- Lucinda do Carmo (1861–1922), Portuguese actress
- Manfredo do Carmo (1928–2018), Brazilian mathematician
- Maria do Carmo Alves (born 1941), Brazilian politician
- Virgílio do Carmo da Silva (born 1967), East Timorese Roman Catholic prelate
- Zé do Carmo (ceramist), Brazilian ceramist
- Zé do Carmo (footballer), Brazilian football player
