= Rogerio Miguel Puga =

Portuguese academic

Rogério Miguel Puga
- Born: 1974 (age 51–52)

Academic background
- Education: PhD NOVA FCSH, 2007

Academic work
- Discipline: English Studies
- Website: www.fcsh.unl.pt/faculdade/docentes/puga/

Rogério Miguel Puga (born 1974) holds a PhD in English Literature / Anglo-Portuguese Studies (NOVA FCSH). He is associate professor with Habilitation (Agregação) at the Faculty of Social and Human Sciences of NOVA University Lisbon. He was a lecturer at Institute of Education and Sciences, (ISEC, Lisbon, 2000–2005), assistant professor at the University of Macau (2007–2009) and a senior researcher at the Centre for English, Translation and Anglo-Portuguese Studies (CETAPS, NOVA University Lisbon). He taught at the Polytechnic Institute of Lisbon (Escola Superior de Comunicação Social, and Escola Superior de Educação de Lisbon) in 2011–2012, 2013–2014, at IADE (2015), and, as Invited Professor, at the Federal University of Tocantins (Brazil). He is a research collaborator at Centre for the Humanities (CHAM, NOVA University Lisbon), CEAUL/ULICES and the Centre for Comparative Studies (University of Lisbon). He is a subject editor for the journal Romance Studies (ISSN 0263-9904), and member of the editorial board of Anais de História de Além-Mar (Print: ISSN 0874-9671, Online: ISSN 2795-4455) and Revista de Estudos Anglo-Portugueses (Print: ISSN 0871-682X, Online: ISSN 2184-0687). He is co-editor of the book series "Anglo-Iberian Studies" (Peter Lang).

== Publications ==
He has published more than 100 articles, books chapters and books and presented over 300 hundred papers on English, Portuguese, and North-American literatures and cultures, Travel Writing and on the British and Portuguese empires, including:

- ———— (2006). O Essencial sobre o Romance Histórico [The Essentials of Historical Romance] (in Portuguese). Lisboa: Imprensa Nacional-Casa da Moeda. ISBN 972-27-1494-5 – via Academia.edu.
- ———— (May 2009). A World of Euphemism. Representações de Macau na Obra de Austin Coates: City of Broken Promises enquanto Romance Histórico e Bildungsroman Feminino [A World of Euphemism: Representations of Macao in the Work of Austin Coates: City of Broken Promises as Historical Novel and Female Bildungsroman] (in Portuguese). Fundação Calouste Gulbenkian, Fundação para a Ciência e Tecnologia. ISBN 978-972-31-1290-0 – via Academia.edu.
- ———— (2009). A presença inglesa e as relações anglo-portuguesas em Macau (1635–1793) [The English presence and Anglo-Portuguese relations in Macau (1635–1793)] (in Portuguese). Centro de História de Além-Mar. hdl:10362/43745. ISBN 978-989-95563-4-8.
- ———— (2011-01-08). Chronology of Portuguese Literature 1128–2000. Newcastle upon Tyne: Cambridge Scholars Publishing. ISBN 978-1-5275-5125-1. LCCN 2011535350. OCLC 1203559240. OL 25197409M – via Google Books.
- ———— (2013). The British Presence in Macau, 1637–1793. Royal Asiatic Society. Hong Kong: Hong Kong University Press. ISBN 978-988-8139-79-8. LCCN 2013383538. OL 25637013M.
- ———— (January 2014). Imagologia e Mitos Nacionais: O Episódio dos Doze de Inglaterra na Literatura Portuguesa (c.1550–1902) e o Nacionalismo (Colonial) de Teófilo Braga [Imagology and National Myths: The Twelfth Episode of England in Portuguese Literature (c.1550-1902) and Nationalism (Colonial) by Teófilo Braga] (in Portuguese). Lisbon: Caleidoscópio. ISBN 978-989-658-270-8 – via Academia.edu.
- ———— (2015). Introduction. "Alice" Contada aos Mais Pequenos [Lewis Carroll's the Nursery "Alice"]. By Carroll, Lewis (in Portuguese). Translated by ————. Portlaoise: Evertype. ISBN 978-1-78201-118-7. OCLC 930016788. Archived from the original on 2021-06-14.
- ————; Rêgo, Manuela, eds. (2015). Alice no País das Maravilhas: 150 Anos [Alice in Wonderland: 150 Years] (in Portuguese). Lisbon: Biblioteca Nacional de Portugal. ISBN 978-972-565-566-5 – via Academia.edu.
- ———— (May 2016). O bildungsroman: (romance de formação), perspectivas [The bildungsroman: (formation novel), perspectives] (in Portuguese) (1st ed.). London: Institute of Modern Languages Research, School of Advanced Study, University of London. ISBN 978-972-99724-5-4. OCLC 1062294199 – via Academia.edu.
- ————, ed. (2016). Interpretar e Traduzir o Imaginário de Roald Dahl [Interpreting and Translating the Imagination of Roald Dahl] (in Portuguese). Lisbon: Biblioteca Nacional de Portugal. ISBN 978-972-565-585-3. OCLC 1028655557 – via Academia.edu.
- ————, ed. (2016). A Obra e os Legados de Beatrix Potter [The Work and Legacy of Beatrix Potter] (in Portuguese). Lisbon: Biblioteca Nacional de Portugal. ISBN 978-972-565-585-6 – via Academia.edu.
- ————, ed. (2017). Enid Blyton (1897–1968): 75 anos de Os Cinco [Enid Blyton (1897–1968): 75 years of The Five] (in Portuguese). Lisbon: Biblioteca Nacional de Portugal. ISBN 978-972-565-639-6 – via Academia.edu.
- ————, ed. (2017). Jane Austen em Portugal: (con)textos [Jane Austen in Portuguese: (con)texts] (in Portuguese). Lisbon: Biblioteca Nacional de Portugal. ISBN 978-972-565-612-9 – via Academia.edu.
- ————, ed. (2020). Irmãs Brontë: 200 anos. Universos ficcionais e biográficos [The Brontë Sisters 200 Years: Biographical and Fictional Universes] (in Portuguese). Lisbon: Biblioteca Nacional de Portugal. ISBN 978-972-565-675-4 – via Academia.edu.
- ————, ed. (2021). Frankenstein 200 Anos: As Sombras e os Monstros de Mary Shelley [Frankenstein 200 Years: The Shadows and the Monsters of Mary Shelley] (in Portuguese). Lisbon: Biblioteca Nacional de Portugal. ISBN 978-972-565-687-7 – via Academia.edu.
- ———— (2023). To the Farthest Gulf for the Wealth of India: Representações de Macau no Peabody Essex Museum (Salem) [To the Farthest Gulf for the Wealth of India: Representations of Macao in the Peabody Essex Museum (Salem)] (in Portuguese and Chinese). Macao, China: Fundação Macau. ISBN 978-99937-1-3388.
- ———— (2024). (co-ed.), Translation and Transposition in the Early Modern Period: Knowledge, Literature, Travel. London, New York: Routledge. ISBN 9780367552169.
