= Jaime Larrazabal Bretón =

Mexican politician

- Born: 26 May 1952 (age 74); Ejutla de Crespo, Oaxaca, Mexico
- Education: UABJO
- Occupation: Politician
- Political party: PRI

Jaime Arturo Larrazabal Bretón (born 26 May 1952) is a Mexican politician from the Institutional Revolutionary Party (PRI). In the 2000 general election he was elected to the Chamber of Deputies to represent the tenth district of Oaxaca during the 58th session of Congress. He previously served in the Legislative Assembly of the Federal District from 1997 to 2000.

His brother Fernando is also a politician.
