= Fernando Larrazábal Bretón =

Mexican politician

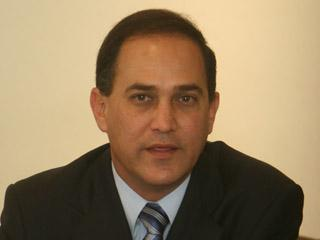
Fernando Larrazábal Bretón is a Mexican politician

Fernando Larrazábal Bretón (born 11 August 1962) is a Mexican politician who was a member of the National Action Party. He has served as mayor of San Nicolás de los Garza and was a member of the 71st session of the Congress of Nuevo León from 2006 to 2009. He was municipal president of Monterrey between 2009 and 2012. In the 2012 general election he was elected to the Chamber of Deputies to represent Nuevo León's 10th district during the 62nd Congress.

== Personal life and education ==
Larrazábal was born in Oaxaca, Oaxaca, on 11 August 1962. He attended the Monterrey Institute of Technology and Higher Education from 1980 to 1984, graduating with a civil engineering degree.

Larrazábal is married to Eleonora Cárdenas with whom he has three young daughters.

His brother Jaime is also a politician.

== See also ==
- 2009 Nuevo León state election
- 2000 Nuevo León state election

Preceded by	Federal deputy for Nuevo León's 10th district 2012–2015	Succeeded by
Preceded by Adalberto Madero	Municipal president of Monterrey, Nuevo León; 2009–2012	Succeeded by Jaime Bazaldúa Robledo
Preceded by Jorge Luis Hinojosa	Municipal president of San Nicolás de los Garza, Nuevo León; 2000–2003	Succeeded by Miguel Ángel Rodríguez Ramírez
