= Jorge Luis Hinojosa =

Mexican politician

- Born: 27 September 1954 (age 71); Nuevo León, Mexico
- Occupation: Politician
- Political party: PAN

Jorge Luis Hinojosa Moreno (born 27 September 1954) is a Mexican politician affiliated with the National Action Party. As of 2014 he served as Deputy of the LIX Legislature of the Mexican Congress as a plurinominal representative.

Preceded by Adalberto Núñez Ramos	Municipal President of San Nicolás de los Garza, Nuevo León; 1997—2000	Succeeded by Fernando Larrazábal Bretón
