= 10th federal electoral district of Oaxaca =

Federal electoral district of Mexico

Oaxaca's 10th
- Electoral district of the Chamber of Deputies of Mexico

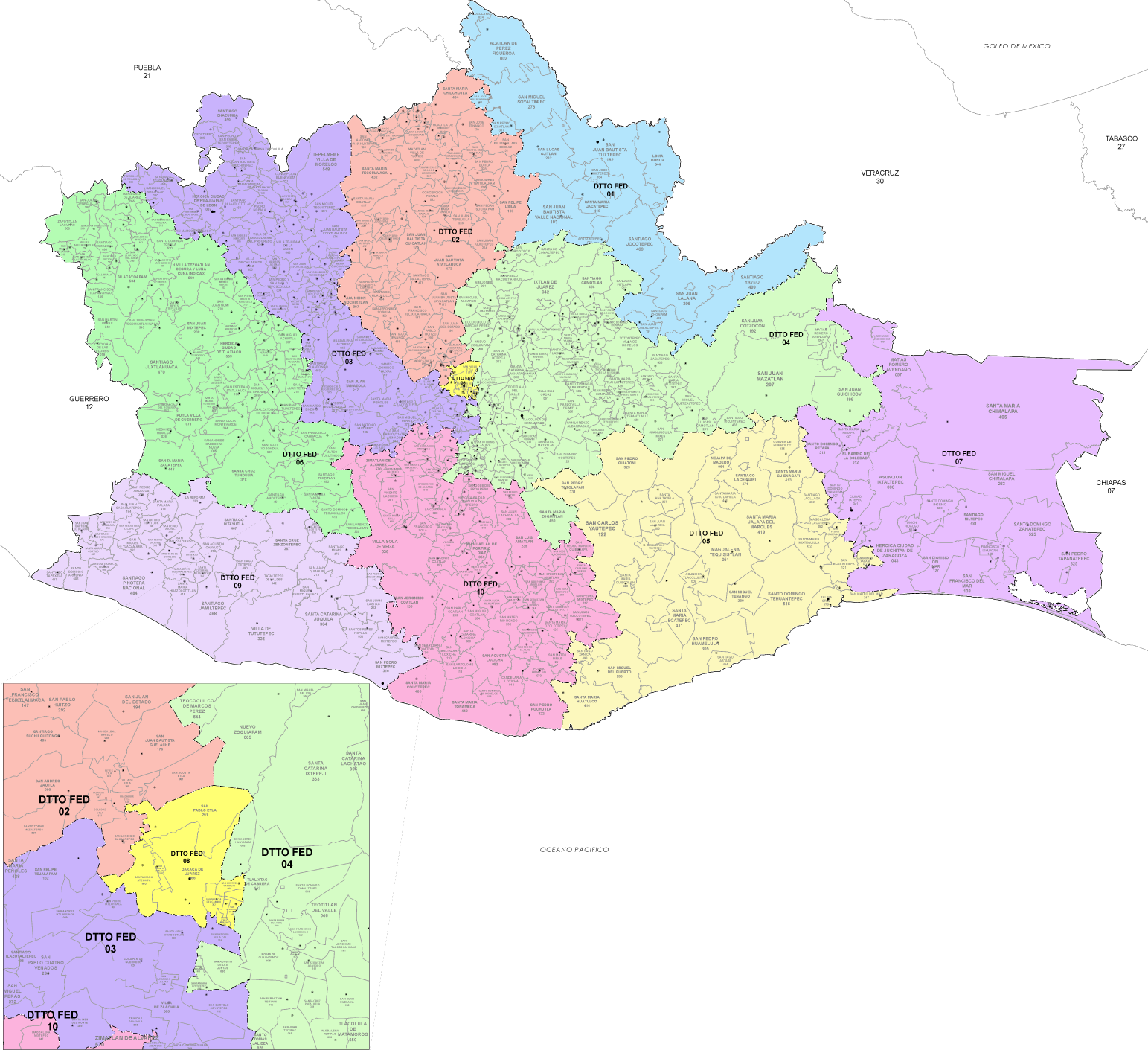
- 10th district

Incumbent
- Member: Carmelo Cruz Mendoza
- Party: ▌Morena
- Congress: 66th (2024–2027)

District
- State: Oaxaca
- Head town: Miahuatlán de Porfirio Díaz
- Coordinates: 16°19′N 96°35′W
- Covers: 77 municipalities
- PR region: Third
- Precincts: 275
- Population: 442,838 (2020 census)
- Indigenous: Yes (63%)

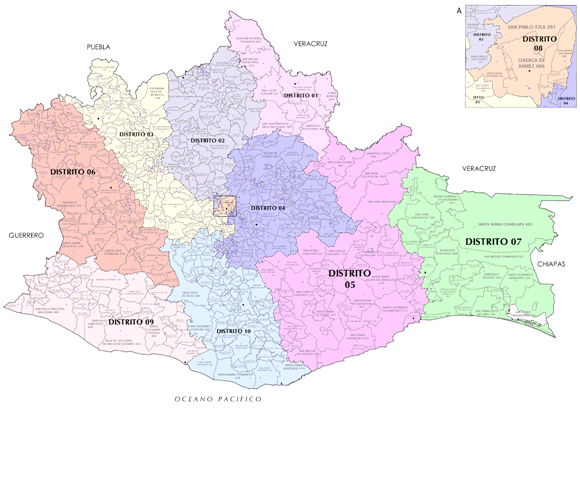
Oaxaca under the 2017–2022 districting plan

The 10th federal electoral district of Oaxaca (Spanish: Distrito electoral federal 10 de Oaxaca) is one of the 300 electoral districts into which Mexico is divided for elections to the federal Chamber of Deputies and one of 10 such districts in the state of Oaxaca.

It elects one deputy to the lower house of Congress for each three-year legislative period by means of the first-past-the-post system. Votes cast in the district also count towards the calculation of proportional representation ("plurinominal") deputies elected from the third region.

Oaxaca's 10th district was created as part of the 1977 electoral reforms. Under the 1975 districting plan, Oaxaca had only nine congressional districts; under the 1977 reforms, the number increased to ten. The newly created district elected its first deputy, to the 51st Congress, in the 1979 legislative election.

The current member for the district, elected in the 2024 general election, is Carmelo Cruz Mendoza of the National Regeneration Movement (Morena).

== District territory ==
Under the 2023 districting plan adopted by the National Electoral Institute (INE), which is to be used for the 2024, 2027 and 2030 federal elections, the 10th district covers 275 precincts (secciones electorales) across 77 municipalities. (Note: Oaxaca accounts for 3.3% of the country's population and 4.8% of its surface area, but it contains almost a quarter of its municipalities: 570 out of 2,446 as of 2022.)

The head town (cabecera distrital), where results from individual polling stations are gathered together and tallied, is the city of Miahuatlán de Porfirio Díaz in the Sierra Sur region. The district reported a population of 442,838 in the 2020 census and, with Indigenous and Afrodescendent inhabitants accounting for over 63% of that total, it is classified by the INE as an indigenous district. (Note: The INE deems any local or federal electoral district where Indigenous or Afrodescendent inhabitants number 40% or more of the total population to be an indigenous district. In the 2023 scheme, Oaxaca's 10 federal districts and 25 local districts are all indigenous.)

== Previous districting schemes ==
Evolution of electoral district numbers
	1974	1978	1996	2005	2017	2023
Oaxaca	9	10	11	11	10	10
Chamber of Deputies	196	300				

2017–2022

Oaxaca's 11th district was dissolved in the 2017 redistricting process. Under the 2017 to 2022 scheme, the 10th district had its head town at the city of Miahuatlán and it covered 65 municipalities.

2005–2017

Between 2005 and 2017, the district comprised 56 municipalities and its head town was Miahuatlán.

1996–2005

Between 1996 and 2017, Oaxaca's seat allocation was increased to 11. Under the 1996 districting plan, the head town was at Miahuatlán and it covered 60 municipalities.

1978–1996

The districting scheme in force from 1978 to 1996 was the result of the 1977 electoral reforms, which increased the number of single-member seats in the Chamber of Deputies from 196 to 300. Under that plan, Oaxaca's seat allocation rose from nine to ten. The new 10th district had its head town at Santo Domingo de Tehuantepec in the Istmo de Tehuantepec region.

== Deputies returned to Congress ==
(Mexico) National parties
- Current
- PAN
- PRI
- PT
- PVEM
- MC
- Morena
- PAZ
- Somos
- Defunct or local only
- PLM
- PNR
- PRM
- PNM
- PP
- PPS
- PARM
- PFCRN
- CON
- PANAL
- PSD
- PES
- PES
- PRD

Oaxaca's 10th district
Election	Deputy	Party	Term	Legislature
1979	Ignacio Villanueva Vázquez	Institutional Revolutionary Party	1979–1982	51st Congress
1982	Joseph Stephan Acar	Institutional Revolutionary Party	1982–1985	52nd Congress
1985	Alfredo López Ramos	Institutional Revolutionary Party	1985–1988	53rd Congress
1988	Jorge Camacho Cabrera	Institutional Revolutionary Party	1988–1991	54th Congress
1991	Francisco Felipe Ángel Villarreal	Institutional Revolutionary Party	1991–1994	55th Congress
1994	María del Carmen Ricárdez Vela	Institutional Revolutionary Party	1994–1997	56th Congress
1997	Claudio Marino Guerra López	Institutional Revolutionary Party	1997–2000	57th Congress
2000	Jaime Arturo Larrazábal Bretón	Institutional Revolutionary Party	2000–2003	58th Congress
2003	Héctor Pablo Ramírez Puga	Institutional Revolutionary Party	2003–2006	59th Congress
2006	Benjamín Hernández Silva	Party of the Democratic Revolution	2006–2009	60th Congress
2009	Héctor Pablo Ramírez Puga	Institutional Revolutionary Party	2009–2012	61st Congress
2012	Aída Fabiola Valencia Ramírez	Citizens' Movement (Mexico)	2012–2015	62nd Congress
2015	Óscar Valencia García	Institutional Revolutionary Party	2015–2018	63rd Congress
2018	Daniel Gutiérrez Gutiérrez	National Regeneration Movement	2018–2021	64th Congress
2021	Daniel Gutiérrez Gutiérrez	National Regeneration Movement	2021–2024	65th Congress
2024	Carmelo Cruz Mendoza	National Regeneration Movement	2024–2027	66th Congress

== Presidential elections ==
Oaxaca's 10th district
Election	District won by	Party or coalition	%
2018	Andrés Manuel López Obrador	Juntos Haremos Historia	64.0628
2024	Claudia Sheinbaum Pardo	Sigamos Haciendo Historia	78.0302
