= Aída Valencia =

Mexican politician

- Born: Aída Fabiola Valencia Ramírez; 31 January 1978 (age 48); San Agustin Loxicha, Oaxaca, Mexico
- Occupation: Deputy
- Political party: MC (1990s–2014); MORENA (2014–present)

Aída Fabiola Valencia Ramírez (born 31 January 1978) is a Mexican politician affiliated with the National Regeneration Movement (formerly with the Citizens' Movement). She was born in San Agustín Loxicha, Oaxaca.

In the 2012 general election she was elected to the Chamber of Deputies on the Citizens' Movement ticket to represent the tenth district of Oaxaca during the 62nd Congress.
