= Portugal national football team results (2020–present) =

This page is a list of all the matches that Portugal national football team has played between 2020 and 2039.

== 2020s ==
=== 2020 ===
| 5 September 2020 2020-21 UEFA NL | Portugal | 4–1 | Croatia | Porto, Portugal |
| 20:45 | Cancelo 42'; Jota 59'; Félix 71'; A. Silva 90+6' | Report | Petković 90+2' | Stadium: Estádio do Dragão; Attendance: 0 (Note: Due to the COVID-19 pandemic in Europe, all matches scheduled for September 2020 were played behind closed doors.); Referee: Davide Massa (Italy) |

| 8 September 2020 2020-21 UEFA NL | Sweden | 0–2 | Portugal | Solna, Sweden |
| 20:45 | | Report | Ronaldo 45+1', 72' | Stadium: Friends Arena; Attendance: 0 Referee: Danny Makkelie (Netherlands) |

| 7 October 2020 Friendly | Portugal | 0–0 | Spain | Lisbon, Portugal |
| 20:45 | | Report | | Stadium: Estádio José Alvalade; Attendance: 2,500; Referee: Paolo Valeri (Italy) |

| 11 October 2020 2020-21 UEFA NL | France | 0–0 | Portugal | Saint-Denis, France |
| 20:45 | | Report | | Stadium: Stade de France; Attendance: 1,000; Referee: Carlos del Cerro Grande (Spain) |

| 14 October 2020 2020-21 UEFA NL | Portugal | 3–0 | Sweden | Lisbon, Portugal |
| 20:45 | B. Silva 21'; Jota 44', 72' | Report | | Stadium: Estádio José Alvalade; Attendance: 5,000; Referee: Srđan Jovanović (Serbia) |

| 11 November 2020 Friendly | Portugal | 7–0 | Andorra | Lisbon, Portugal |
| 20:45 | Neto 8'; Paulinho 29', 61'; Sanches 56'; García 76' (o.g.); Ronaldo 85'; Félix 88' | Report | | Stadium: Estádio da Luz; Attendance: 0 Referee: Alain Bieri (Switzerland) |

| 14 November 2020 2020-21 UEFA NL | Portugal | 0–1 | France | Lisbon, Portugal |
| 20:45 | | Report | Kanté 54' | Stadium: Estádio da Luz; Attendance: 0 Referee: Tobias Stieler (Germany) |

| 17 November 2020 2020-21 UEFA NL | Croatia | 2–3 | Portugal | Split, Croatia |
| 20:45 | Kovačić 29', 65' | Report | Dias 52', 90'; Félix 60' | Stadium: Stadion Poljud; Attendance: 0 Referee: Michael Oliver (England) |

=== 2021 ===
| 24 March 2021 2022 FWC Q. | Portugal | 1–0 | Azerbaijan | Turin, Italy |
| 20:45 | Medvedev 37' (o.g.) | Report | | Stadium: Juventus Stadium; Attendance: 0 Referee: Daniel Siebert (Germany) |

| 27 March 2021 2022 FWC Q. | Serbia | 2–2 | Portugal | Belgrade, Serbia |
| 20:45 | A. Mitrović 46'; Kostić 60' | Report | Jota 11', 36' | Stadium: Stadion Rajko Mitić; Attendance: 0 Referee: Danny Makkelie (Netherlands) |

| 30 March 2021 2022 FWC Q. | Luxembourg | 1–3 | Portugal | Luxembourg City, Luxembourg |
| 20:45 | Rodrigues 30' | Report | Jota 45+2'; Ronaldo 51'; Palhinha 80' | Stadium: Stade Josy Barthel; Attendance: 0 Referee: Sergey Ivanov (Russia) |

| 4 June 2021 Friendly | Spain | 0–0 | Portugal | Madrid, Spain |
| 19:30 | | Report | | Stadium: Wanda Metropolitano; Attendance: 14,743; Referee: Craig Pawson (England) |

| 9 June 2021 Friendly | Portugal | 4–0 | Israel | Lisbon, Portugal |
| 20:45 | Fernandes 42', 90+1'; Ronaldo 44'; Cancelo 86' | Report | | Stadium: Estádio José Alvalade; Attendance: 0 Referee: Jérémie Pignard (France) |

| 15 June 2021 Euro 2020 GS | Hungary | 0–3 | Portugal | Budapest, Hungary |
| 17:00 | | Report | Guerreiro 84'; Ronaldo 87' (pen.), 90+2' | Stadium: Puskás Aréna; Attendance: 55,662; Referee: Cüneyt Çakır (Turkey) |

| 19 June 2021 Euro 2020 GS | Portugal | 2–4 | Germany | Munich, Germany |
| 17:00 | Ronaldo 15'; Jota 67' | Report | Dias 35' (o.g.); Guerreiro 39' (o.g.); Havertz 51'; Gosens 60' | Stadium: Allianz Arena; Attendance: 12,926; Referee: Anthony Taylor (England) |

| 23 June 2021 Euro 2020 GS | Portugal | 2–2 | France | Budapest, Hungary |
| 20:00 | Ronaldo 31' (pen.), 60' (pen.) | Report | Benzema 45+2' (pen.), 47' | Stadium: Puskás Aréna; Attendance: 54,886; Referee: Antonio Mateu Lahoz (Spain) |

| 27 June 2021 Euro 2020 R16 | Belgium | 1–0 | Portugal | Seville, Spain |
| 21:00 | T. Hazard 42' | Report | | Stadium: La Cartuja; Attendance: 11,504; Referee: Felix Brych (Germany) |

| 1 September 2021 2022 FWC Q. | Portugal | 2–1 | Republic of Ireland | Faro/Loulé, Portugal |
| 20:45 | Ronaldo 89', 90+6' | Report | Egan 45' | Stadium: Estádio Algarve; Attendance: 7,831; Referee: Matej Jug (Slovenia) |

| 4 September 2021 Friendly | Qatar | 1–3 | Portugal | Debrecen, Hungary |
| 19:45 | Hassan 61' | Report | Silva 23'; Otávio 25'; Fernandes 88' (pen.) | Stadium: Nagyerdei Stadion; Attendance: 0 Referee: Gergő Bogár (Hungary) |

| 7 September 2021 2022 FWC Q. | Azerbaijan | 0–3 | Portugal | Baku, Azerbaijan |
| 18:00 | | Report | B. Silva 26'; A. Silva 31'; Jota 75' | Stadium: Olympic Stadium; Attendance: 20,574; Referee: Marco Guida (Italy) |

| 9 October 2021 Friendly | Portugal | 3–0 | Qatar | Faro/Loulé, Portugal |
| 20:15 | Ronaldo 37'; Fonte 48'; A. Silva 90' | Report | | Stadium: Estádio Algarve; Attendance: 15,087; Referee: Fedayi San (Switzerland) |

| 12 October 2021 2022 FWC Q. | Portugal | 5–0 | Luxembourg | Faro/Loulé, Portugal |
| 20:45 | Ronaldo 8' (pen.), 13' (pen.), 87'; Fernandes 18'; Palhinha 69' | Report | | Stadium: Estádio Algarve; Attendance: 18,553; Referee: Benoît Bastien (France) |

| 11 November 2021 2022 FWC Q. | Republic of Ireland | 0–0 | Portugal | Dublin, Ireland |
| 20:45 | | Report | | Stadium: Aviva Stadium; Attendance: 50,373; Referee: Jesús Gil Manzano (Spain) |

| 14 November 2021 2022 FWC Q. | Portugal | 1–2 | Serbia | Lisbon, Portugal |
| 20:45 | Sanches 2' | Report | Tadić 33'; A. Mitrović 90' | Stadium: Estádio da Luz; Attendance: 58,873; Referee: Daniele Orsato (Italy) |

=== 2022 ===
| 24 March 2022 2022 FWC Q. PO | Portugal | 3–1 | Turkey | Porto, Portugal |
| 20:45 | Otávio 15'; Jota 42'; Nunes 90+4' | Report | Yılmaz 65' | Stadium: Estádio do Dragão; Attendance: 48,010; Referee: Daniel Siebert (Germany) |

| 29 March 2022 2022 FWC Q. PO | Portugal | 2–0 | North Macedonia | Porto, Portugal |
| 19:45 | Fernandes 32', 65' | Report | | Stadium: Estádio do Dragão; Attendance: 48,010; Referee: Anthony Taylor (England) |

| 2 June 2022 2022-23 UEFA NL | Spain | 1–1 | Portugal | Seville, Spain |
| 20:45 | Morata 25' | Report | Horta 82' | Stadium: Benito Villamarín; Attendance: 41,236; Referee: Michael Oliver (England) |

| 5 June 2022 2022-23 UEFA NL | Portugal | 4–0 | Switzerland | Lisbon, Portugal |
| 19:45 | Carvalho 15'; Ronaldo 35', 39'; Cancelo 68' | Report | | Stadium: Estádio José Alvalade; Attendance: 42,325; Referee: Orel Grinfeeld (Israel) |

| 9 June 2022 2022-23 UEFA NL | Portugal | 2–0 | Czech Republic | Lisbon, Portugal |
| 19:45 | Cancelo 33'; Guedes 38' | Report | | Stadium: Estádio José Alvalade; Attendance: 44,100; Referee: Matej Jug (Slovenia) |

| 12 June 2022 2022-23 UEFA NL | Switzerland | 1–0 | Portugal | Geneva, Switzerland |
| 20:45 | Seferovic 1' | Report | | Stadium: Stade de Genève; Attendance: 26,300; Referee: Fran Jović (Croatia) |

| 24 September 2022 2022-23 UEFA NL | Czech Republic | 0–4 | Portugal | Prague, Czech Republic |
| 20:45 | | Report | Dalot 33', 52'; Fernandes 45+2'; Jota 82' | Stadium: Sinobo Stadium; Attendance: 19,322; Referee: Srđan Jovanović (Serbia) |

| 27 September 2022 2022-23 UEFA NL | Portugal | 0–1 | Spain | Braga, Portugal |
| 19:45 | | Report | Morata 88' | Stadium: Estádio Municipal; Attendance: 28,196; Referee: Daniele Orsato (Italy) |

| 17 November 2022 Friendly | Portugal | 4–0 | Nigeria | Lisbon, Portugal |
| 19:45 | Fernandes 9', 35' (pen.); Ramos 82'; João Mário 84' | Report | | Stadium: Estádio José Alvalade; Attendance: 43,621; Referee: Chrysovalantis Theouli (Cyprus) |

| 24 November 2022 2022 FWC GS | Portugal | 3–2 | Ghana | Doha, Qatar |
| 19:00 | Ronaldo 65' (pen.); Félix 78'; Leão 80' | Report | A. Ayew 73'; Bukari 89' | Stadium: Stadium 974; Attendance: 42,662; Referee: Ismail Elfath (United States) |

| 28 November 2022 2022 FWC GS | Portugal | 2–0 | Uruguay | Lusail, Qatar |
| 22:00 | Fernandes 54', 90+3' (pen.) | Report | | Stadium: Lusail Iconic Stadium; Attendance: 88,668; Referee: Alireza Faghani (Iran) |

| 2 December 2022 2022 FWC GS | South Korea | 2–1 | Portugal | Al Rayyan, Qatar |
| 18:00 | Kim Young-gwon 27'; Hwang Hee-chan 90+1' | Report | Horta 5' | Stadium: Education City Stadium; Attendance: 44,097; Referee: Facundo Tello (Argentina) |

| 6 December 2022 2022 FWC R16 | Portugal | 6–1 | Switzerland | Lusail, Qatar |
| 22:00 | Ramos 17', 51', 67'; Pepe 33'; Guerreiro 55'; Leão 90+2' | Report | Akanji 58' | Stadium: Lusail Iconic Stadium; Attendance: 83,720; Referee: César Arturo Ramos (Mexico) |

| 10 December 2022 2022 FWC QF | Morocco | 1–0 | Portugal | Doha, Qatar |
| 18:00 | En-Nesyri 42' | Report | | Stadium: Al Thumama Stadium, Doha; Attendance: 44,198; Referee: Facundo Tello (Argentina) |

=== 2023 ===
| 23 March 2023 Euro 2024 Q. | Portugal | 4–0 | Liechtenstein | Lisbon, Portugal |
| 20:45 UTC+1 | Cancelo 8'; B. Silva 47'; Ronaldo 51' (pen.), 63' | Report | | Stadium: Estádio José Alvalade; Attendance: 45,378; Referee: Espen Eskås (Norway) |

| 26 March 2023 Euro 2024 Q. | Luxembourg | 0–6 | Portugal | Luxembourg City, Luxembourg |
| 20:45 UTC+1 | | Report | Ronaldo 9', 31'; Félix 15'; B. Silva 18'; Otávio 77'; Leão 88' | Stadium: Stade de Luxembourg; Attendance: 9,231; Referee: Radu Petrescu (Romania) |

| 17 June 2023 Euro 2024 Q. | Portugal | 3–0 | Bosnia and Herzegovina | Lisbon, Portugal |
| 19:45 | B. Silva 44'; Fernandes 77', 90+3' | Report | | Stadium: Estádio da Luz; Attendance: 55,058; Referee: Davide Massa (Italy) |

| 20 June 2023 Euro 2024 Q. | Iceland | 0–1 | Portugal | Reykjavík, Iceland |
| 20:45 | | Report | Ronaldo 89' | Stadium: Laugardalsvöllur; Attendance: 8,600; Referee: Daniel Siebert (Germany) |

| 8 September 2023 Euro 2024 Q. | Slovakia | 0–1 | Portugal | Bratislava, Slovakia |
| 20:45 | | Report | Fernandes 43' | Stadium: Tehelné pole Attendance: 21,473; Referee: Glenn Nyberg (Sweden) |

| 11 September 2023 Euro 2024 Q. | Portugal | 9–0 | Luxembourg | Faro/Loulé, Portugal |
| 19:45 | Inácio 12', 45+4'; Ramos 17', 33'; Jota 57', 77'; Horta 67'; Fernandes 83'; Félix 88' | Report | | Stadium: Estádio Algarve; Attendance: 18,932; Referee: John Brooks (England) |

| 13 October 2023 Euro 2024 Q. | Portugal | 3–2 | Slovakia | Porto, Portugal |
| 19:45 | Ramos 18'; Ronaldo 29' (pen.), 72' | Report | Hancko 69'; Lobotka 80' | Stadium: Estádio do Dragão; Attendance: 46,601; Referee: Anastasios Sidiropoulos (Greece) |

| 16 October 2023 Euro 2024 Q. | Bosnia and Herzegovina | 0–5 | Portugal | Zenica, Bosnia and Herzegovina |
| 20:45 | | Report | Ronaldo 5' (pen.), 20'; Fernandes 25'; Cancelo 32'; Félix 41' | Stadium: Bilino Polje; Attendance: 13,047; Referee: Halil Umut Meler (Turkey) |

| 16 November 2023 Euro 2024 Q. | Liechtenstein | 0–2 | Portugal | Vaduz, Liechtenstein |
| 20:45 | | Report | Ronaldo 46'; Cancelo 57' | Stadium: Rheinpark Stadion; Attendance: 5,749; Referee: Mohammed Al-Hakim (Sweden) |

| 19 November 2023 Euro 2024 Q. | Portugal | 2–0 | Iceland | Lisbon, Portugal |
| 19:45 | Fernandes 37'; Horta 66' | Report | | Stadium: Estádio José Alvalade; Attendance: 45,655; Referee: Anastasios Papapetrou (Greece) |

=== 2024 ===
| 21 March 2024 Friendly | Portugal | 5–2 | Sweden | Guimarães, Portugal |
| 19:45 WET (UTC+00:00) | Leão 24'; Nunes 33'; Fernandes 45'; Bruma 57'; Ramos 61' | Report | Gyökeres 58'; Nilsson 90' | Stadium: Estádio D. Afonso Henriques; Attendance: 27,532; Referee: Ricardo de Burgos Bengoetxea (Spain) |

| 26 March 2024 Friendly | Slovenia | 2–0 | Portugal | Ljubljana, Slovenia |
| 20:45 CET (UTC+01:00) | Čerin 72'; Elšnik 80' | Report | | Stadium: Stožice Stadium; Attendance: 16,432; Referee: Irfan Peljto (Bosnia and Herzegovina) |

| 4 June 2024 Friendly | Portugal | 4–2 | Finland | Lisbon, Portugal |
| 19:45 WEST (UTC+01:00) | Dias 17'; Jota 45+4' (pen.); Fernandes 55', 84' | Report | Pukki 73', 77' | Stadium: Estádio José Alvalade; Attendance: 43,125; Referee: Christian-Petru Ciochirca (Austria) |

| 8 June 2024 Friendly | Portugal | 1–2 | Croatia | Oeiras, Portugal |
| 17:45 WEST (UTC+01:00) | Jota 48' | Report | Modrić 8' (pen.); Budimir 56' | Stadium: Estádio Nacional; Attendance: 37,800; Referee: Harm Osmers (Germany) |

| 11 June 2024 Friendly | Portugal | 3–0 | Republic of Ireland | Aveiro, Portugal |
| 19:45 WEST (UTC+01:00) | Félix 18'; Ronaldo 50', 60' | Report | | Stadium: Estádio Municipal de Aveiro; Attendance: 32,830; Referee: Chris Kavanagh (England) |

| 18 June 2024 Euro 2024 GS | Portugal | 2–1 | Czech Republic | Leipzig, Germany |
| 21:00 CEST (UTC+02:00) | Hranáč 69' (o.g.); Conceição 90+2' | Report | Provod 62' | Stadium: Red Bull Arena; Attendance: 38,421; Referee: Marco Guida (Italy) |

| 22 June 2024 Euro 2024 GS | Turkey | 0–3 | Portugal | Dortmund, Germany |
| 18:00 CEST (UTC+02:00) | | Report | Silva 21'; Akaydin 28' (o.g.); Fernandes 56' | Stadium: Westfalenstadion; Attendance: 61,047; Referee: Felix Zwayer (Germany) |

| 26 June 2024 Euro 2024 GS | Georgia | 2–0 | Portugal | Gelsenkirchen, Germany |
| 21:00 CEST (UTC+02:00) | Kvaratskhelia 2'; Mikautadze 57' (pen.) | Report | | Stadium: Arena AufSchalke; Attendance: 49,616; Referee: Sandro Schärer (Switzerland) |

| 1 July 2024 Euro 2024 R16 | Portugal | 0–0 (a.e.t.) (3–0 p) | Slovenia | Frankfurt, Germany |
| 21:00 CEST (UTC+02:00) | Ronaldo (penalty missed) 105' | Report | | Stadium: Waldstadion; Attendance: 46,576; Referee: Daniele Orsato (Italy) |
| | Penalties |
| | Ronaldo (penalty scored); Fernandes (penalty scored); Silva (penalty scored) | | (penalty missed) Iličić; (penalty missed) Balkovec; (penalty missed) Verbič |

| 5 July 2024 Euro 2024 QF | Portugal | 0–0 (a.e.t.) (3–5 p) | France | Hamburg, Germany |
| 21:00 CEST (UTC+02:00) | | Report | | Stadium: Volksparkstadion; Attendance: 47,789; Referee: Michael Oliver (England) |
| | Penalties |
| | Ronaldo (penalty scored); Silva (penalty scored); Félix (penalty missed); Mendes (penalty scored) | | (penalty scored) Dembélé; (penalty scored) Fofana; (penalty scored) Koundé; (penalty scored) Barcola; (penalty scored) Hernandez |

| 5 September 2024 2024-25 UEFA NL | Portugal | 2–1 | Croatia | Lisbon, Portugal |
| 19:45 WEST (UTC+01:00) | Dalot 7'; Ronaldo 34' | Report | Dalot 41' (o.g.) | Stadium: Estádio da Luz; Attendance: 57,675; Referee: Halil Umut Meler (Turkey) |

| 8 September 2024 2024-25 UEFA NL | Portugal | 2–1 | Scotland | Lisbon, Portugal |
| 19:45 WEST (UTC+01:00) | Fernandes 54'; Ronaldo 88' | Report | McTominay 7' | Stadium: Estádio da Luz; Attendance: 59,894; Referee: Maurizio Mariani (Italy) |

| 12 October 2024 2024-25 UEFA NL | Poland | 1–3 | Portugal | Warsaw, Poland |
| 20:45 CEST (UTC+02:00) | Zieliński 78' | Report | Silva 26'; Ronaldo 37'; Bednarek 88' (o.g.) | Stadium: Stadion Narodowy; Attendance: 56,854; Referee: Serdar Gözübüyük (Netherlands) |

| 15 October 2024 2024-25 UEFA NL | Scotland | 0–0 | Portugal | Glasgow, Scotland |
| 19:45 WEST (UTC+01:00) | | Report | | Stadium: Hampden Park; Attendance: 49,057; Referee: Lawrence Visser (Belgium) |

| 15 November 2024 2024-25 UEFA NL | Portugal | 5–1 | Poland | Porto, Portugal |
| 19:45 WET (UTC+00:00) | Leão 59'; Ronaldo 72' (pen.), 87'; Fernandes 80'; Neto 83' | Report | Marczuk 88' | Stadium: Estádio do Dragão; Attendance: 47,239; Referee: Donatas Rumšas (Lithuania) |

| 18 November 2024 2024-25 UEFA NL | Croatia | 1–1 | Portugal | Split, Croatia |
| 20:45 CET (UTC+01:00) | Gvardiol 65' | Report | Félix 33' | Stadium: Stadion Poljud; Attendance: 33,386; Referee: Davide Massa (Italy) |

=== 2025 ===
| 20 March 2025 2025 UEFA NL QF | Denmark | 1–0 | Portugal | Copenhagen, Denmark |
| 20:45 CET (UTC+01:00) | Eriksen (penalty missed) 24'; Højlund 78' | Report | | Stadium: Parken Stadium; Attendance: 36,322; Referee: Irfan Peljto (Bosnia and Herzegovina) |

| 23 March 2025 2025 UEFA NL QF | Portugal | 5–2 (a.e.t.) (5–3 agg.) | Denmark | Lisbon, Portugal |
| 19:45 WET (UTC+00:00) | Andersen 38' (o.g.); Ronaldo 72'; Trincão 86', 91'; Ramos 115' | Report | Kristensen 56'; Eriksen 76' | Stadium: Estádio José Alvalade; Attendance: 47,123; Referee: Slavko Vinčić (Slovenia) |

| 4 June 2025 2025 UEFA NL SF | Germany | 1–2 | Portugal | Munich, Germany |
| 21:00 CEST (UTC+02:00) | Wirtz 48' | Report | Conceição 63'; Ronaldo 68' | Stadium: Allianz Arena; Attendance: 65,823; Referee: Slavko Vinčić (Slovenia) |

| 8 June 2025 2025 UEFA NL F | Portugal | 2–2 (a.e.t.) (5–3 p) | Spain | Munich, Germany |
| 21:00 CEST | Mendes 26'; Ronaldo 61' | Report | Zubimendi 21'; Oyarzabal 45' | Stadium: Allianz Arena; Attendance: 65,852; Referee: Sandro Schärer (Switzerland) |
| | Penalties |
| | Ramos (penalty scored); Vitinha (penalty scored); Fernandes (penalty scored); Mendes (penalty scored); Neves (penalty scored) | | (penalty scored) Merino; (penalty scored) Baena; (penalty scored) Isco; (penalty missed) Morata |

| 6 September 2025 2026 FWC Q. | Armenia | 0–5 | Portugal | Yerevan, Armenia |
| 20:00 AMT (UTC+04:00) | | Report | Félix 10', 62'; Ronaldo 21', 46'; Cancelo 32' | Stadium: Vazgen Sargsyan Republican Stadium; Attendance: 14,403; Referee: Anthony Taylor (England) |

| 9 September 2025 2026 FWC Q. | Hungary | 2–3 | Portugal | Budapest, Hungary |
| 20:45 CEST (UTC+02:00) | Varga 21', 84' | Report | B. Silva 36'; Ronaldo 58' (pen.); Cancelo 86' | Stadium: Puskás Aréna; Attendance: 61,473; Referee: Erik Lambrechts (Belgium) |

| 11 October 2025 2026 FWC Q. | Portugal | 1–0 | Republic of Ireland | Lisbon, Portugal |
| 19:45 WEST (UTC+01:00) | R. Neves 90+1' | Report | | Stadium: Estádio José Alvalade; Attendance: 48,821; Referee: Ivan Kružliak (Slovakia) |

| 14 October 2025 2026 FWC Q. | Portugal | 2–2 | Hungary | Lisbon, Portugal |
| 19:45 WEST (UTC+01:00) | Ronaldo 22', 45+3' | Report | Szalai 8'; Szoboszlai 90+1' | Stadium: Estádio José Alvalade; Attendance: 47,854; Referee: Srđan Jovanović (Serbia) |

| 13 November 2025 2026 FWC Q. | Republic of Ireland | 2–0 | Portugal | Dublin, Ireland |
| 19:45 WEST (UTC+01:00) | Parrott 17', 45' | Report | | Stadium: Aviva Stadium; Attendance: 50,717; Referee: Glenn Nyberg (Sweden) |

| 16 November 2025 2026 FWC Q. | Portugal | 9–1 | Armenia | Porto, Portugal |
| 14:00 WET (UTC+00:00) | Veiga 7'; Ramos 28'; Neves 30', 41', 81'; Fernandes 45+3' (pen.), 52', 72' (pen.); Conceição 90+2' | Report | Spertsyan 18' | Stadium: Estádio do Dragão; Attendance: 46,702; Referee: Irfan Peljto (Bosnia and Herzegovina) |

=== 2026 ===
| 28 March 2026 Friendly | Mexico | 0–0 | Portugal | Mexico City, Mexico |
| 20:00 CST (UTC-06:00) | | Report | | Stadium: Estadio Azteca; Attendance: 84,130; Referee: Walter López (Guatemala) |

| 31 March 2026 Friendly | United States | 0–2 | Portugal | Atlanta, United States |
| 19:00 EDT (UTC-04:00) | | Report | Trincão 37'; Félix 59' | Stadium: Mercedes-Benz Stadium; Attendance: 72,297; Referee: Sven Jablonski (Germany) |

| 6 June 2026 Friendly | Portugal | 2–1 | Chile | Oeiras, Portugal |
| 18:45 EEST (UTC+01:00) | Guedes 58'; Fernandes 75' | Report | Cepeda 90+2' | Stadium: Estádio Nacional; Attendance: 37,031; Referee: Luca Zufferli (Italy) |

| 10 June 2026 Friendly | Portugal | 2–1 | Nigeria | Leiria, Portugal |
| 20:45 EEST (UTC+01:00) | Neto 23'; Conceição 75' | Report | Adams 37' | Stadium: Estádio Dr. Magalhães Pessoa; Attendance: 21,049; Referee: Mateo Busquets Ferrer (Spain) |

| 17 June 2026 2026 FWC GS | Portugal | 1–1 | DR Congo | Houston, United States |
| 12:00 EST (UTC-05:00) | J. Neves 6' | Report | Wissa 45+5' | Stadium: NRG Stadium; Attendance: 68,777; Referee: Abdulrahman Al-Jassim (Qatar) |

| 23 June 2026 2026 FWC GS | Portugal | 5–0 | Uzbekistan | Houston, United States |
| 12:00 UTC−5 | Ronaldo 6', 39'; Mendes 17'; Nematov 60' (o.g.); Leão 87' | Report | | Stadium: NRG Stadium; Attendance: 68,777; Referee: Jalal Jayed (Morocco) |

| 27 June 2026 2026 FWC GS | Colombia | 0–0 | Portugal | Miami Gardens, United States |
| 17:30 EDT (UTC-04:00) | | Report | | Stadium: Hard Rock Stadium; Attendance: 64,478; Referee: Alireza Faghani (Australia) |

| 2 July 2026 2026 FWC R32 | Portugal | 2–1 | Croatia | Toronto, Canada |
| 19:00 EDT (UTC-04:00) | Ronaldo 68' (pen.); Ramos 90+4' | Report | Perišić 53' | Stadium: BMO Field; Attendance: 43,036; Referee: Espen Eskås (Norway) |

| 6 July 2026 2026 FWC R16 | Portugal | 0–1 | Spain | Arlington, United States |
| 14:00 CDT (UTC-05:00) | | Report | Merino 90+1' | Stadium: AT&T Stadium; Attendance: 70,649; Referee: Anthony Taylor (England) |

| 24 September 2026 2026–27 UEFA NL | Portugal | 1–0 | Wales | Lisbon, Portugal |
| 19:45 UTC+1 | Félix 22' | Report | | Stadium: Estádio José Alvalade; Attendance: 47,725; Referee: Donatas Rumšas (Lithuania) |

| 27 September 2026 2026–27 UEFA NL | Norway | 1–2 | Portugal | Oslo, Norway |
| 20:45 UTC+2 | Haaland 51' | Report | Félix 17'; Ramos 54' | Stadium: Ullevaal Stadion; Attendance: 25,953; Referee: François Letexier (France) |

| 1 October 2026 2026–27 UEFA NL | Denmark | 2–4 | Portugal | Copenhagen, Denmark |
| 20:45 UTC+2 | Damsgaard 23'; Højlund 53' | Report | Cancelo 13'; Ramos 25'; Vitinha 67'; Félix 87' | Stadium: Parken Stadium; Attendance: 35,951; Referee: Mykola Balakin (Ukraine) |

| 4 October 2026 2026–27 UEFA NL | Portugal | 2–1 | Norway | Porto, Portugal |
| 19:45 UTC+1 | Cancelo 38'; Ramos 79' | Report | Ajer 36' | Stadium: Estádio do Dragão; Attendance: 48,832; Referee: Maurizio Mariani (Italy) |

| 14 November 2026 2026–27 UEFA NL | Portugal | 1–4 | Denmark | Braga, Portugal |
| 19:45 UTC+0 | B. Silva 90+3' | Report | Højbjerg 43' (pen.); Højlund 50', 57'; Andersen 75' | Stadium: Estádio Municipal de Braga; Attendance: 24,879; Referee: Rade Obrenovič (Slovenia) |

| 17 November 2026 2026–27 UEFA NL | Wales | 2–3 | Portugal | Cardiff, Wales |
| 19:45 UTC+0 | Brooks 13'; Thomas 40' | Report | Fernandes 11'; Neto 43'; Forbs 70' | Stadium: Cardiff City Stadium; Attendance: 32,682; Referee: Sven Jablonski (Germany) |
