= A. H. de Oliveira Marques =

Portuguese historian

António Henrique Rodrigo de Oliveira Marques (23 August 1933 – 23 January 2007) was a Portuguese historian.

== Life ==
Oliveira Marques was born in the 'freguesia' of S. João do Estoril, Cascais.

He studied history and philosophy and graduated in 1956 from the University of Lisbon with a thesis entitled A Sociedade em Portugal nos Séculos XII a XIV (Portuguese Society from 12th to 14th Centuries). After training in the University of Würzburg, in Germany, he would start teaching the following year at the University of Lisbon and received his doctorate in 1960. His PhD dissertation was entitled Hansa e Portugal na Idade Média (Hanseatic League and Portugal in the Middle Ages).

In 1962, his participation in student strikes against the right-wing regime of Oliveira Salazar resulted in his dismissal from the university as a scholar. He left for the United States where he taught history at a number of universities (Auburn, Florida, Columbia, Minnesota and Chicago) between 1965 and 1970.

Oliveira Marques returned to Portugal in 1970, but only resumed teaching at Portuguese universities in 1974, the year in which the Carnation Revolution ended almost five decades of the Estado Novo regime.

From October 1974 to April 1976, he was director of the National Library of Lisbon.

In 1998, he was granted the Grand Cross of the Order of Liberty, a state accolade which distinguishes figures who have made a contribution to the values of civilization.

== Work ==
Considered one of Portugal's greatest experts on Portuguese Medieval history, he wrote more than 60 books and numerous articles. One of his most famous works, A History of Portugal, is translated into several languages.

Some of his works include:

- A Sociedade em Portugal nos Séculos XII a XIV
- Hansa e Portugal na Idade Média
- Introdução à História da Agricultura em Portugal
- A Sociedade Medieval Portuguesa: aspectos da vida quotidiana
- Guia do Estudante de História Medieval Portuguesa
- História de Portugal (A History of Portugal, has been translated to English, French, Japanese, Polish and Spanish.)
- Nova História de Portugal (coordinator, with Joel Serrão)
- Nova História da Expansão Portuguesa (coordinator, with Joel Serrão)
- História dos Portugueses no Extremo Oriente (coordinator)
- História da Maçonaria em Portugal
