= Manuel João Ramos =

Portuguese anthropologist (born 1960)

- Born: May 8, 1960 (age 66); Lisbon
- Citizenship: Portuguese
- Education: Universidade Nova de Lisboa (BA), Universidade Nova de Lisboa (MsC), ISCTE-IUL (PhD)
- Scientific career
- Fields: Anthropology, Ethiopian Studies, Mythology Symbolism, Risk
- Workplaces: ISCTE-IUL
- Doctoral advisor: José Carlos Gomes da Silva (ISCTE - University Institute of Lisbon)
- Website: https://www.mjr.link/

Manuel João Mendes Silva Ramos (born 1960) is a Portuguese anthropologist, artist and civil rights advocate. As an author, he is widely held in libraries worldwide.

== Early life and education ==
Ramos was born in Lisbon, Portugal, the eldest son of late actor Jacinto Ramos, He took his BA in Anthropology in 1982, at New University of Lisbon, his MsC in Comparative Literary Studies in 1987, also at New University of Lisbon, and his PhD in Symbolic Anthropology at ISCTE-IUL.

== Career ==
He joined the Anthropology Department of ISCTE-IUL in 1984 as Assistant Lecturer, where he now teaches as Associate Professor, specializing in Symbolic Anthropology. He is also Principal Investigator at the Centre of International Studies of ISCTE-IUL (formerly Centre of African Studies), and its subdirector since 2006. He is the head of the Central Library of African Studies, a MERIL research building located at the ISCTE-IUL's Library. In 2009, he was elected to the board of directors of Africa-Europe Group for Interdisciplinary Studies (AEGIS).

Ramos has maintained a parallel career as draftsman and illustrator, working for Portuguese periodicals, frequently with writer Rui Zink. Part of his illustration work has been published in the form of travel journals.

Since the death of his eldest daughter in a car crash in 1998, he has participated in the cause of road risk reduction and self-mobilization for more just and sustainable forms of mobility. He is the head of the Portuguese NGO Association of Self-Mobilized Citizens. These activities led hims election as councillor of Lisbon City Council in a citizen's list. He became vice-president of the European Federation of Road Traffic Victims (FEVR) in 2008 and later member of the board of directors of the Global Alliance of Road Safety NGOs. He is presently FEVR's representative at the UN Road Safety Collaboration UNRSC, a UN consultative forum and partnership.

=== Main works ===
Ramos' publications in the area of anthropology include studies in Christian symbolism and mythology (his Essays in Christian Mythology: the metamorphoses of Prester John, first published in Portuguese in 1998, were translated in English in 2006) and research in Ethiopian oral traditions (Histórias Etíopes: Diário de Viagem, 2000, new edition in 2010). With historians Isabel Boavida and Hervé Pennec, he published a scholarly edition of the História da Etiópia of the Spanish Jesuit missionary Pedro Páez (1564 – 1622), first in Portuguese in 2008, in the collection of Obras Primas da Literatura Portuguesa, and then at the Hakluyt Society's third series' collection. The latter was translated by Christopher Tribe, with the title Pedro Páez's History of Ethiopia, 1622, in two volumes.

== Bibliography ==
=== Books and book chapters ===
- Ensaios de mitologia cristã: o Preste João e a reversibilidade simbólica. Lisbon: Assírio & Alvim, 1997 (ISBN 978-9723704174).
- "Machiavellian Empowerment and Disempowerment. The Violent Struggle for Power in 17th Century Ethiopia", in Angela Cheater (ed.), The Anthropology of Power: Empowerment and Disempowerment in Changing Structures. London - New York: Routledge, 1999.
- Histórias Etíopes: Diário de viagem. Lisbon: Assírio & Alvim, 2000.
- Sinais do Trânsito. Lisbon: Assírio & Alvim, 2000.
- "Nem mais nem menos? Literalidade e problematização em antropologia". In María Cátedra (ed.) La Mirada Cruzada. Madrid: Catarata, 2002.
- Essays in Christian Mythology: the metamorphoses of Prester John. Langham: University Press of America, 2006 (ISBN 978-0-7618-3388-8).
- Memórias dos Pescadores de Sesimbra: Santiago de Sesimbra no Início dos Anos Oitenta do Séc. XX. Memórias da Sociedade de Geografia de Lisboa 10. Lisbon: SGL, 2009.
- Histórias Etíopes: Diário de Viagem. Lisbon: Edições Tinta da China, 2010 (Second edition: ISBN 978-989-671-034-7).
- Magnólia Dias, Alexandra (2013). State and Societal Challenges in the Horn of Africa. Centro de Estudos Internacionais. ISBN 978-972-8335-23-6. OCLC 1006957517.
- Of Hairy Kings and Saintly Slaves. Canon Pyon: Sean Kingston Publishing, 2018 (ISBN 978-1-907774-19-5).

=== Edited volumes ===
- Carta do Preste João das Índias: versões medievais latinas, edited and introduced by M.J. Ramos, translated from the Latim by Leonor Buescu. Lisbon: Assírio & Alvim, 1998.
- A Pintura Narrativa Etíope: Narrative Art in Ethiopia. With João Paulo Cotrim. Lisbon: Bedeteca de Lisboa - Câmara Municipal de Lisboa, 2000.
- A Matéria do património: memórias e identidades. Lisbon: Colibri, 2003.
- Konso-Harar: fotoetnografias na Etiópia. Lisbon: Assírio & Alvim, 2003.
- The Indigenous and the Foreign in Christian Ethiopian Art: On Portuguese-Ethiopian contacts in the 16th-17th centuries. With Isabel Boavida. Aldershot: Ashgate, 2004.
- Espírito de missão, thematic number of Cadernos de Estudos Africanos, 15. With Rodolfo Soares. Lisbon: Centro de Estudos Africanos - ISCTE, 2008.
- The Walker and the City. With Mário J. Alves. Lisbon: Associação de Cidadãos Auto-Mobilizados, 2010.
- Memória e Artifício: Matéria do património II. With António Medeiros . Memórias da Sociedade de Geografia de Lisboa 11. Lisbon: SGL, 2010.
- Risco e trauma rodoviários em Portugal. Lisbon: Associação de Cidadãos Auto-Mobilizados, 2011.
- Pedro Páez's History of Ethiopia, 1622, 2 vols. With Isabel Boavida and Hervé Pennec. Translated by Christopher Tribe. London: Hakluyt Society, 2011.
- African Dynamics in a Multipolar World (avec Ulf Engel). Leiden: Brill, 2013.
- Fluid Networks and Hegemonic Powers in the Western Indian Ocean (avec Iain Walker et Preben Kaarsholm). Lisbonne: EBook'IS, 2017.

=== Articles in journals ===
- “O Durkheimeanismo Hoje – Classificações, Hierarquias, Ambiguidades”. Trabalhos de Arqueologia e Etnologia. 36, 1996. pp. 73-89.
- “Origen y evolución de una imagen Cristo-mimética: el Preste Juan en el tiempo y el espacio de las ideas cosmológicas europeas”. Politica y Sociedad. 25, 1997. pp. 37-43.
- A Sisígia nos Bestiários Medievais: Confronto, Combinação, Transformação”. Etnográfica, 1 (1), 1997. pp. 97–112.
- “On the Embedment of Classical Models of Dichotomy in Modern Anthropology: the Case of Literacy Studies”. Trabalhos de Arqueologia e Etnologia. 39, 3-4, 1999. p. 61-80.
- “Ambiguous Legitimacy: The Legend of the Queen of Sheba in Popular Ethiopian Painting” (avec Isabel Boavida). Annales d’Ethiopie, 21, 2005. pp. 84–92.
- “Stop the academic world, I wanna get off in Quai Branly. Of sketchbooks, museums and anthropology”. Cadernos de Arte e Antropologia. 4 (2), 2015. pp. 141–178.
- (avec Aina Azevedo) “Drawing close: on visual engagements in fieldwork, drawing workshops and the anthropological imagination”. Visual Ethnography. 5 (1), 2016. 135-160.
- (avec Daniel Malet Calvo) “Suddenly last summer: how the tourist tsunami hit Lisbon”. Revista Andaluza de Antropología. 15, 2018. pp. 47–73.
- “Castle Building in SeventeenthCentury Gondär (Ethiopia)”. Aethiopica: International Journal of Ethiopian and Eritrean Studies. 7, 2018. pp. 25–42.
- “Ceci n’est pas un Dessin: Notes on the Production and Sharing of Fieldwork Sketches”. Cadernos de Arte e Antropologia. 8 (2), 2019. pp. 57–64.

=== Literary and artistic work ===
- Os Surfistas, By Rui Zink; illustrations by Manuel João Ramos. Lisbon: Publicações Dom Quixote. 2002.
- Major Alverca, By Manuel João Ramos and Rui Zink. Lisbon: Publicações Dom Quixote, 2003.
- The Boy Who didn't like Television, By Manuel João Ramos and Rui Zink. New York: McAdam/Cage, 2004.
- Traços de Viagem, By Manuel João Ramos. Lisbon: Livraria Bertrand, 2009.

=== Translations ===
- Mitos e símbolos na arte e civilização indianas. by Heinrich Zimmer, Translation by Manuel João Ramos and Ana Vasconcelos e Melo. (introduction by José Carlos Gomes da Silva). Lisbon: Assírio & Alvim, 1996.
- Sonhos, ilusão e outras realidades by Wendy Doniger O'Flaherty, Translation by Manuel João Magalhães, revised by Manuel João Ramos. Introduction by José Carlos Gomes da Silva. Lisbon: Assírio & Alvim, 2003.
