= Héctor Pablo Ramírez Puga =

Mexican politician

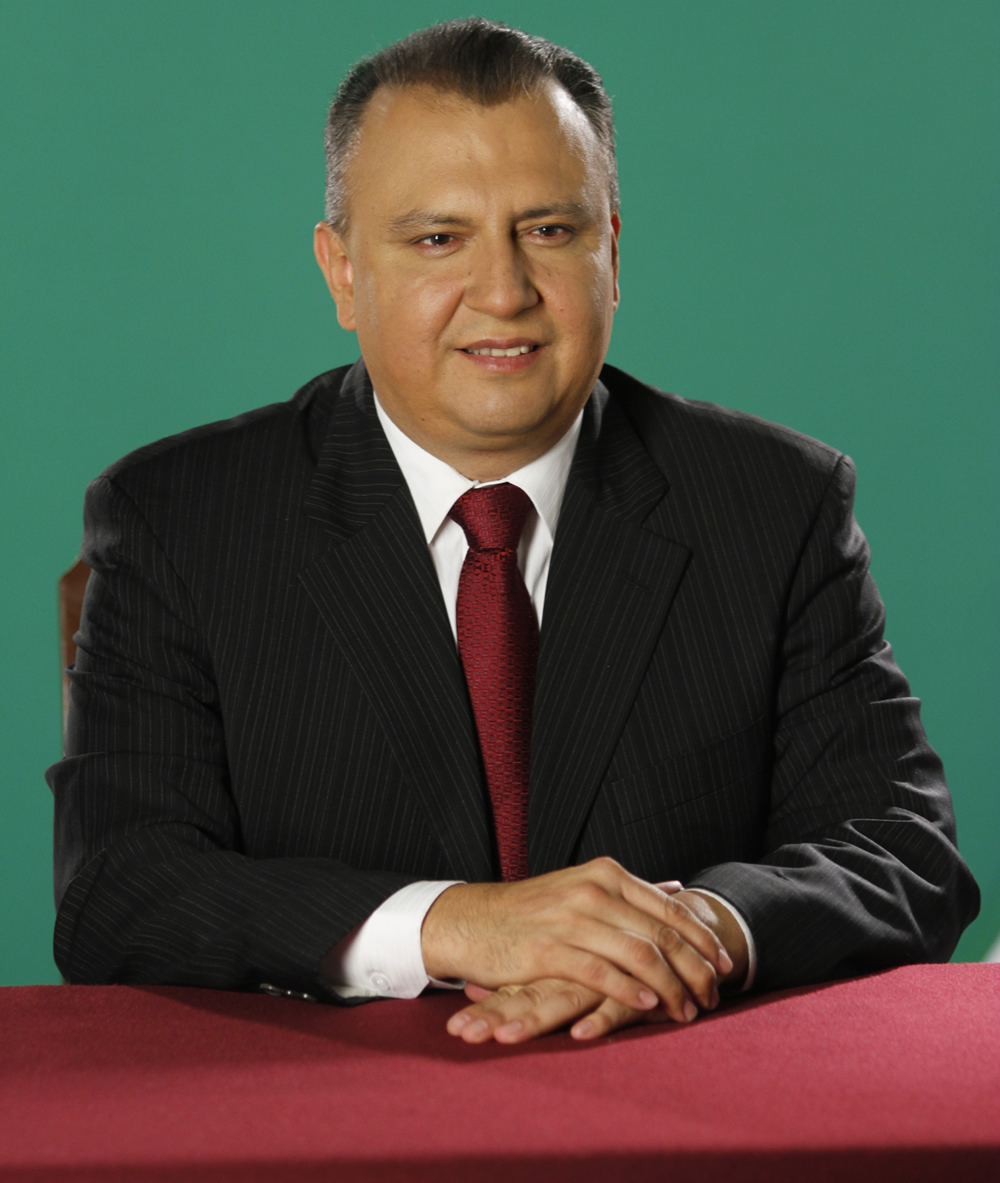
- Born: 30 November 1967 (age 58); Oaxaca, Oaxaca, Mexico
- Education: UDLAP
- Occupation: Politician
- Political party: PRI

Héctor Pablo Ramírez Puga (born 30 November 1967) is a Mexican politician affiliated with the Institutional Revolutionary Party (PRI). He was born in the city of Oaxaca de Juárez.

In both the 2003 mid-terms and the 2009 mid-terms he was elected to the Chamber of Deputies to represent the tenth district of Oaxaca (59th and 61st sessions of Congress).

In 2012 he was appointed director of Liconsa, a state-owned company that supplies milk nationwide, by Secretary of Social Development Rosario Robles.
