= Lucinda do Carmo =

Portuguese stage actress (1861–1922)

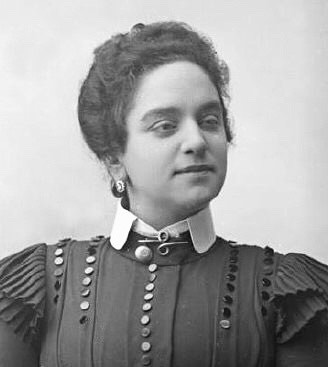
- Born: 15 December 1861; Lisbon, Portugal
- Died: 1 January 1922; Lisbon
- Resting place: Prazeres Cemetery, Lisbon
- Occupation: Actress
- Years active: 40
- Known for: Portuguese theatre
- Awards: Military Order of Saint James of the Sword

Lucinda do Carmo (15 December 1861 – 1 January 1922) was a Portuguese actress in the 19th and 20th centuries who performed in all theatrical genres.

== Early life and career ==
Lucinda do Carmo was born in the Portuguese capital of Lisbon on 15 December 1861. She was the daughter of a decorative arts painter. After taking music lessons at the Conservatório Nacional de Lisboa, she decided to pursue a career in acting; she had previously demonstrated acting talent having performed in amateur dramatics and as a night-club singer. She debuted at the Teatro do Ginásio on 22 September 1882, and spent several years in that theatre playing increasingly important roles, including with the Emília Adelaide company. She then worked at the new Teatro da Trindade, distinguishing herself in the vaudeville-opérette Mam'zelle Nitouche by Hervé. She stayed at the Trindade to perform in several operettas, with an 1888 performance leading to her being named as the "Queen of Vaudeville". She then moved to the Teatro da Rua dos Condes and the D. Maria II National Theatre with the Rosas & Brazão company, where she developed her skills as a comedy actress.

== Later career ==
In 1893, Carmo went with her company to Brazil, performing in Rio de Janeiro and São Paulo. Returning to Lisbon, she played at the Rua dos Condes, and then went to the Portuguese Azores archipelago with a company which she directed. She then joined a company that performed at the Trindade and the Teatro D. Amélia, which later became the Teatro São Luiz. After performing for two seasons in the Teatro D. Afonso in Porto she returned to Lisbon, to the Teatro Avenida. When the government remodelled the salary structure of the state-run D. Maria II National Theatre, she applied to be admitted to the company and was classified as a first-class actress. She did not stay there long, however, moving to the Rua dos Condes. She then formed her own company to perform at the Avenida.

By 1901, Carmo was back at the Trindade. From that time until when she rejoined the D. Maria II National Theatre in 1911, she seems to have been relatively inactive. However, she did make one film in 1907, called The Abduction of an Actress, which is believed to have been the first Portuguese fiction film and was allegedly shot in five hours. In 1911, she returned to the D. Maria II National Theatre company, playing in Lisbon and also Porto. She stayed with that company until 1920 when she joined the Teatro Moderno cooperative company.

== Death ==
In the last few years of her life, Carmo also wrote published poetry, employing the caustic wit for which she was known. In late 1921 she broke a leg when stepping off a tram car. She died on 1 January 1922, reportedly having got into bed, refused food and stopped talking. Her funeral attracted numerous mourners. She was buried in Lisbon's Prazeres Cemetery.

== Honours and awards ==
- Carmo was made a Commander of the Portuguese national award, the Military Order of Saint James of the Sword.
- In 1931, a street was named after her in the Alto do Pina parish of Lisbon.
