= Faculty of Social and Human Sciences =

Coordinates: 38.7404903°N 9.150902°W

Faculty of Social and Human Sciences (NOVA FCSH)
- Faculdade de Ciências Sociais e Humanas
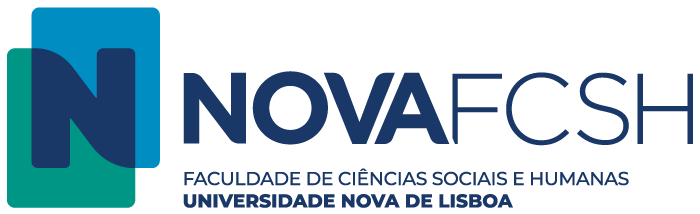
- Other name: NOVA FCSH
- Type: Public
- Established: 1977
- Dean: Alexandra Curvelo
- Administrative staff: 99
- Students: 5154
- Undergraduates: 2693
- Postgraduates: 1583
- Doctoral students: 878
- Location: Lisbon, Portugal
- Campus: Av. de Berna, center Lisbon
- Colours: Green and blue
- Website: www.fcsh.unl.pt

The Portuguese Faculdade de Ciências Sociais e Humanas (Faculty of Social and Human Sciences - FCSH) is an organic unit of the Universidade NOVA de Lisboa (NOVA). According to its statutes, “the Faculty of Social and Human Sciences of NOVA University of Lisbon is an institution dedicated to education, scientific research and cultural creation". The Faculty's own identity stems from the coexistence of social sciences with humanities, allowing an unusual interdisciplinarity in the Portuguese higher education panorama.

== General description ==
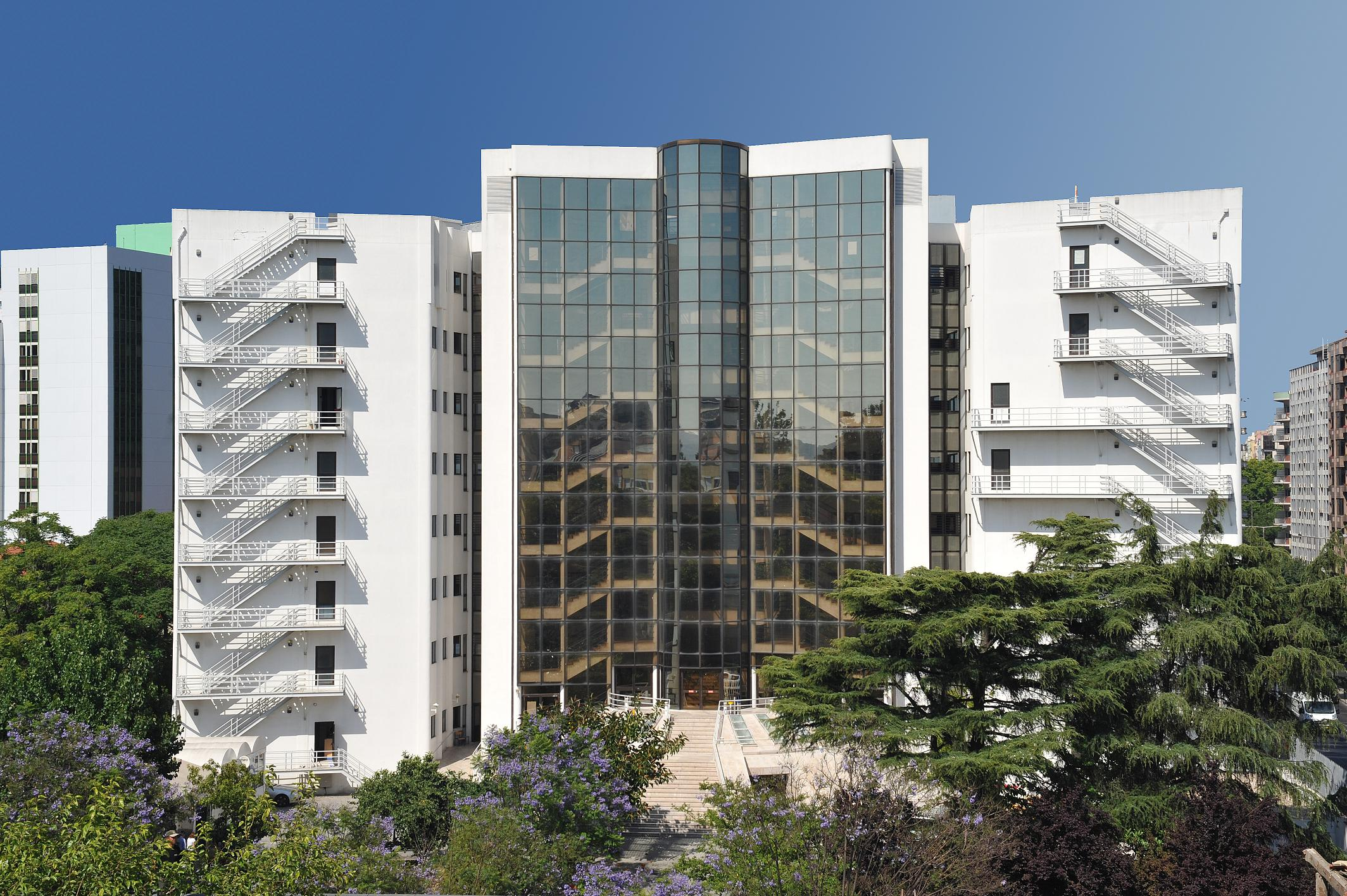
The FCSH main building is inspired by the image of an open book

NOVA FCSH was established in January 1977 by Decree-Law No. 464/77, following the development of the area of Human and Social Sciences that existed at NOVA at the time, led by a group of faculty members and researchers, namely J. S. da Silva Dias, Leonor Buescu, João Morais Barbosa, Artur Nobre de Gusmão, Fernando Gil, Augusto Mesquitela Lima, A.H. de Oliveira Marques, José Augusto França, Vitorino Magalhães Godinho, José Mattoso, Raquel Soeiro de Brito, Teolinda Gersão, Leonor Machado de Sousa, Yvete Kace Centeno and Teresa Rita Lopes. The Faculty began its activity on 2 January 1978.

The FCSH is located at Av. Berna, in the centre of Lisbon, next to the Calouste Gulbenkian Foundation. Based on a barracks that belonged to the military, the Faculty's facilities are divided into B1 and B2 buildings (classrooms and departments), Tower A (classrooms and head office of the Languages Institute of the Universidade NOVA de Lisboa - ILNOVA]), Tower B (departments, and the Mário Sottomayor Cardia Library), boards of management, administrative services, cafeteria, Students Association and, since 2009, the ID building (Research and PhD degrees). This building, known as the former DRM (Military District Recruitment), has recently undergone a major change in order to be adapted to the new objectives it has been assigned. The core of the administrative support for PhD degrees, the research units associated with NOVA FCSH and classrooms for the PhD programmes located in the ID building.

In addition to teaching areas (classrooms, lecture halls and auditoriums), the NOVA FCSH also has various spaces for socialization, a printing centre and a large courtyard. To solve logistical issues created by recent growth, new facilities are scheduled for the NOVA FCSH in the plans of the Campolide Campus, where other Faculties of the Universidade NOVA de Lisboa (NOVA) are already installed, such as the Nova School of Law (NOVA SoL), the Nova Information Management School (NOVA IMS) and the Instituto Superior de Estatística e Gestão de Informação (ISEGI). The Rectory of NOVA and the university residence Alfredo de Sousa are also located in the Campolide Campus.

== Faculty structure ==
The Faculty Structure, according to the RJIES, has the following bodies:

- Faculty Council
- Dean
- Scientific Council
- Pedagogic Council
- Student Council

=== Composition and election of the Faculty Council ===
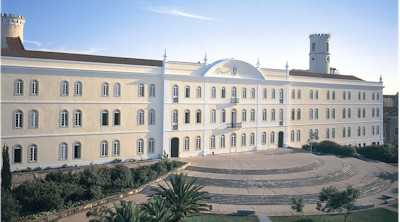
Almada Negreiros College, one of the buildings of the Faculty located in Campolide

The Faculty Council is a representative University body composed of 15 members: nine faculty members or researchers (Manuel Pedro Ferreira, Carlos Carreto, João Luís Lisboa, Ana Margarida Ferreira, Margarida Brito Alves, Dima Mohammed, Luís Trindade, Mafalda Pacheco and Catherine Moury), two students (Tomás Vila Nova and Inês Jorge), two non-professor and non-researcher worker (Isabel Nicola and Olga Cunha) and two external personalities (Maria Inês Cordeiro and Paulo Areosa Feio). Faculty members or researchers are elected for four years (with one possible renewal), whereas external individuals, chosen by the elected counsellors in their first meeting, are nominated by the Rector.

The Faculty Council has the power to:

- Elect its president, a position that is currently held by Paulo Areosa Feio.
- Elect a Dean (by absolute majority, among the Full Professors and research coordinators that integrate the Faculty)
- Evaluate the Dean's actions and adopt amendments to statutes.
- Upon a proposal by the Dean, adopt medium and long-term strategic options, as well as create, change or remove departments, research units or services
- Make decisions regarding the purchase or sale of assets
- Approve annual plans of activities, budgets and accounts.

=== The dean ===
The dean, a position currently held by Alexandra Curvelo, is elected for four years and may be renewed only once through an electoral process that begins three months before the mandate expires. The Dean may designate up to four Vice-Deans, positions currently held by Helena Serra, Sónia Vespeira de Almeida, Madalena Meyer Resende and José Viegas Neves, and associate deans Leonor de Medeiros, Carla Baptista, Ricardo Marnoto Campos, Nuno Dias and João Cancela.

=== Leaders ===
==== Presidents of the FCSH Installation Committee ====
- December 1977 - November 1980: A. H. de Oliveira Marques
- November 1980 - May 1981: J. S. da Silva Dias
- May 1981 - May 1982: João Morais Barbosa

=== FCSH’s deans ===
- May 1982 - December 1986: J. Manuel Nazareth
- December 1986 - February 1988: José Mattoso
- March 1988 - May 1993: Adriano Duarte Rodrigues
- May 1993 - May 1996: J. Manuel Nazareth
- May 1996 - June 2005: Jorge Crespo
- June 2005 - July 2013: João Sàágua
- July 2013 - February 2016: João Costa
- February 2016 - July 2021: Francisco Caramelo
- July 2021 - July 2025: Luís Baptista
- July 2025 - present: Alexandra Curvelo

== Departments ==
The NOVA FCSH delegates the operation of its educational offer to its 12 Departments, as well as the support for scientific and technological development and dissemination of culture in the fields taught. The development of this mission is secured by the faculty members associated each Department - tenured and visiting - supported by a secretariat. The coordination of each department is taken up by a Coordinator appointed by the Dean from the tenured faculty members.

== Research centres ==
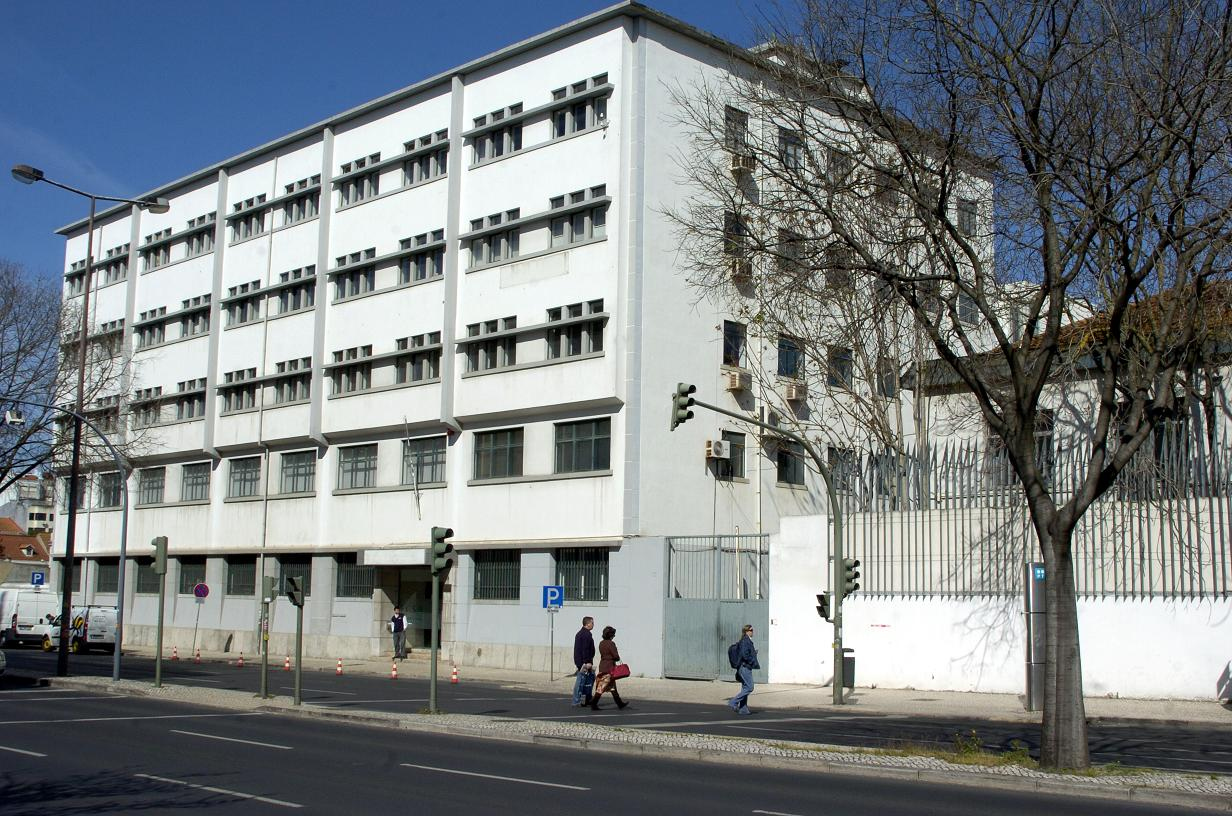
ID building houses the FCSH research centres

FCSH houses a total of 15 Research Centres, whose primary mission is the development of scientific research in different cultural areas of the social sciences and humanities, the education of researchers and the rendering of services to the community.

List of research units:

- History Territories Communities (FCSH Hub of the Centre for Functional Ecology);
- Interdisciplinary Centre of Social Sciences (CICS.NOVA);
- CHAM - Centre for the Humanities (CHAM);
- Institute of Contemporary History (IHC);
- Linguistics Research Centre of the Universidade Nova de Lisboa (CLUNL);
- Portuguese Institute of Internacional Relations (IPRI);
- NOVA Institute of Philosophy (IFILNOVA);
- Institute for the Study of Literature and Tradition (IELT);
- Institute of Ethnomusicology - Centre of Studies in Music and Dance (INET-md);
- Art History Institute (IHA);
- Centre for Research in Anthropology (CRIA);
- NOVA Institute of Communication (ICNOVA);
- Institute for Medieval Studies (IEM);
- Centre for English, Translation and Anglo-Portuguese Studies (CETAPS);
- Centre for Music Studies (CESEM).

== Study cycles ==
Today, the FCSH is the second largest unit of NOVA, both in student numbers, and in financial budget. It has more than 300 faculty members, almost all of them holding a PhD degree or with recognized prestige in their scientific area. It also has about 100 staff members. During the academic year 2015/16, the Faculty admitted a total of 4725 students, 2587 undergraduate, 1488 masters and 650 students for doctoral programs.

The FCSH teaching programme for the academic year 2016/2017 includes 14 undergraduate degrees, 46 masters programs and 28 PhD's, the latter two being exclusively developed during a night schedule.

The study cycle cover the traditional Social Sciences and Humanities fields, but also several thematic and interdisciplinary courses. In addition to a Summer School, the FCSH/NOVA also offers specialization degrees, free courses and, since 1997, a programme on Portuguese Language and Culture. This program is structured according to the six proficiency levels of the Common European Framework of Reference for Languages. It can be intensive (30 hours - 5 times per week), a semester (64 hours two times per week) or taught individually.

Annually, more than 400 students participate in the Mobility Programmes, of which the Erasmus Programme is the best known example. This is one of the examples of the FCSH/NOVA's internationalization strategy.

The BMSC is also a deposit for private donations given by inheritors of former teachers of FCSH: The Leonor Buescu Library (BLB) - 3000 volumes of broad scope, with greater relevance to the area of Linguistics and English Literature; the Luis Krus Library (BLK) - 2200 volumes on Portuguese and European Medieval History, Anthropology and Sociology; the António G. Mattoso Library (BM) - 8500 books of broader scope, with particular importance to the field of History, and the Mário Sottomayor Cardia Library (BMSC) – 70,000 volumes, still not fully treated, that deal with issues of a general nature, with a particular emphasis on Philosophy and Political Science.

The BMSC also includes the bibliographic collection of the American Ladies Club (ALC) - 1000 volumes dedicated to Literature, as well as some personal libraries, as in the case of the Dragomir Knapic Library (BK) - 250 works on Geography; the Rodrigues Michaels Library (BRM) - 1400 works dedicated to the History of Literature and the António Rita Ferreira Library (BRF) - 850 books related to Anthropology, African Colonization, Ethno history of Africa and the John Catarino Library (BJC), containing 700 works on Archaeology.

The BMSC has integrated the properties of the departmental libraries of Anthropology, Art History and Musicology thus increasing its collection by an additional 10,000 books and acquiring the bibliographic collection of musicologist Macario Santiago Kastner.

== Undergraduate programmes ==
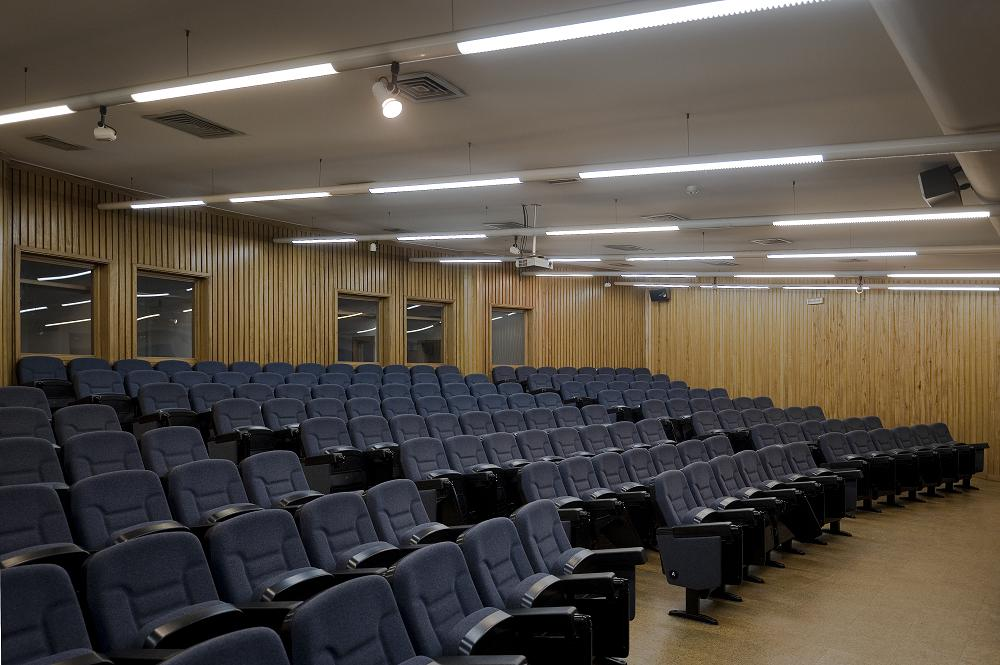
Auditorium 1 at FCSH/NOVA, inside Tower B

- Anthropology
- Archaeology
- Communication Sciences
- Geography and Regional Planning
- History
- History of Art
- Language Sciences
- Languages, Literatures and Cultural Studies
- Musicology
- Philosophy
- Political Science and International Relations
- Portuguese Studies
- Portuguese & Business
- Sociology (daytime and after-work schedule)
- Translation

== Master's Programmes ==
- Aesthetics and Artistic Studies
- Anthropology
- Archaeology
- Art History
- Communication Sciences
- Crossways in Cultural Narratives
- Cultural Heritage
- Editing and Publishing
- Educational Sciences
- E-Learning Systems Management
- English and Foreign Languages Teaching (German, Spanish, or French) in the third Cycle of Basic Education and Secondary Education
- English Language Teaching
- English Teaching in the first Cycle of Basic Education
- Geography Teaching in the third cycle of Basic Education and in Secondary Education
- History
- History of The Portuguese Empire
- Human Ecology
- Information Management and Curation
- Journalism
- Language Sciences
- Migration, Inter-Ethnicity and Transnationalism
- Modern Literatures and Cultures
- Museology
- Musical Arts
- Musicology
- New Media and Web Practices
- Performing Arts
- Philosophy
- Political Science and International Relations
- Portuguese as a Second and Foreign Language
- Portuguese Studies
- Science Communication
- Sociology
- Spatial Planning and Geographic Information Systems
- Sustainable Urbanism and Spatial Planning
- Teaching English in the third Cycle of Basic Education and in Secondary Education
- Teaching History in the third Cycle of Basic Education and in Secondary Education
- Teaching of Music in Basic Education (2nd cycle of Basic Education)
- Teaching Philosophy in Secondary Education
- Teaching Portuguese and a Foreign Language in the third Cycle of Basic Education and in Secondary Education
- Teaching Portuguese in the third Cycle of Basic Education and in Secondary Education
- Teaching Portuguese in the third Cycle of Basic Education and in Secondary Education and Latin in Secondary Education
- Territorial Management
- Translation
- Urban Studies
- Women's Studies. Women in Society and in Culture

== PhD programmes ==
- Anthropology
- Artistic Studies | Art and Mediations
- Climate Changes and Sustainable Development Policy
- Communication Sciences
- Digital Media
- Education Sciences
- Geography and Territorial Planning
- Global Studies
- History
- History and Theory of Ideas
- History of Art
- Human Ecology
- International Relations
- Languages Teaching | Multilingualism and Education for a Global Citizenship
- Linguistics
- Medieval Studies
- Modern Literatures and Cultures
- Musical Arts | Music Dramaturgy and Staging | Instrumental or Vocal Performance
- Musicology
- Philosophy
- Political Science
- Portuguese Studies
- Sociology
- Translation and Terminology
- Translation Studies
- Urban Studies

== Postgraduate studies ==
- Acoustics and Sound Studies
- Art Curatorship
- Art Market Postgraduate Program
- Globalization, Diplomacy and Security
- History, Society and Environment
- Multiplataform Journalism
- Popular Music Studies
- Strategic and Security Studies
- Teaching Portuguese as a second language
- Writing Arts
