= NOVA University of Lisbon =

University in Portugal

Coordinates: 38°44′01″N 9°09′37″W

- Universidade Nova de Lisboa
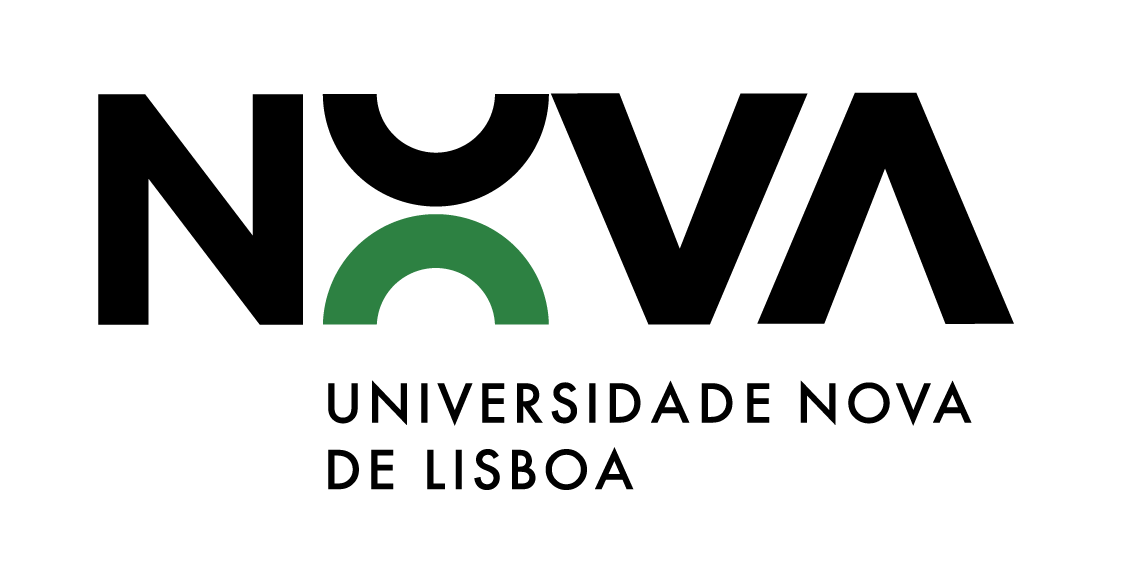
- Motto: Omnis Civitas Contra Se Divisa Non Stabit
- Motto in English: Any city divided against itself will not remain
- Type: Public
- Established: 1973
- Affiliations: CESAER
- Endowment: € 170,283,441 (2016)
- Rector: João Sàágua
- Administrative staff: 1800 (2018)
- Students: 20,077 (2018)
- Undergraduates: 12,649 (2018)
- Postgraduates: 4,947 (2018)
- Doctoral students: 1,979 (2018)
- Other students: 502 (2018)
- Location: Lisbon, Portugal
- Campus: Main campus in Campolide, Lisbon and Caparica, Almada. Other smaller facilities in the region of Lisbon.
- Language: Portuguese, English
- Colours: Green and White
- Website: https://www.unl.pt/

NOVA University of Lisbon (Portuguese: Universidade NOVA de Lisboa, pronounced [univɨɾsiˈðaðɨ ˈnɔvɐ ðɨ liʒˈβoɐ]), or just NOVA, is a Portuguese public university whose rectorate is located in Campolide, Lisbon. Founded in 1973, it is the newest of the public universities in the Portuguese capital city, earning its name as the "New" (NOVA) University of Lisbon.

The institution has more than 20,000 students, 1,800 professors and staff members distributed through five faculties, three institutes and one school, providing a variety of courses in several fields of knowledge.

== History ==
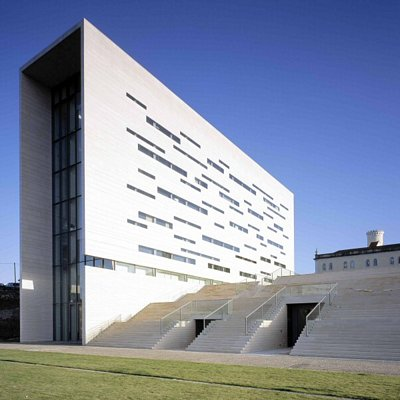
Rectorate building

The NOVA University of Lisbon was founded in 1973 and is the newest public university in the Lisbon metropolitan area, with teaching units in Lisbon, Almada, Oeiras, and Cascais.

It was founded as a response to ever-increasing demand for higher education in Portugal and in Lisbon in particular. While its early years focused on graduate and specialist programs, NOVA started expanding its teaching and research from 1977 onwards.

The structure of NOVA was organized according to a departmental and interdisciplinary model, where each of the Academic Units enjoy a great deal of autonomy.

== Academic units ==
NOVA is divided into nine academic units, which enjoy a great deal of autonomy. These are the following.

- Sciences and technology: FCT NOVA - NOVA School of Science and Technology
- Social sciences and humanities: NOVA FCSH - Faculty of Social and Human Sciences
- Economics and management: Nova SBE - Nova School of Business and Economics
- Medical sciences: NMS|FCM - NOVA Medical School
- Law: NOVA Direito - Faculty of Law
- Statistics and information management: NOVA IMS - NOVA Information Management School
- Chemical and biological technology: ITQB NOVA - António Xavier Institute of Chemical and Biological Technology
- Hygiene and tropical medicine: IHMT - Institute of Tropical Hygiene and Medicine (Portuguese)
- Public health: ENSP-NOVA - National School of Public Health

== Research units ==
The NOVA University of Lisbon hosts 42 Research and Development Units (R&D Units), 15 of which are research partnerships between NOVA and other national institutions. In 2013, the Portuguese Foundation for Science and Technology (FC&T) evaluated 75% of NOVA R&D Units with "Exceptional", "Excellent" or "Very Good".

NOVA is responsible for approximately 10% of the national research papers indexed to the Web of Science. Since the launch of the European Research Council (ERC) grants programme in 2009, NOVA's researchers were awarded a total of 10 grants, placing NOVA as one of the top national institutions in this field.

== NOVA School of Business and Economics ==
The Lisbon MBA is a partnership between NOVA, Catholic University of Portugal and MIT Sloan School of Management. The partnership includes a full-time 1-year MBA and a Part Time MBA. The two Universities that offer this MBA program hold the triple crown accreditation namely AMBA, EQUIS and AACSB.

In 2019, the NOVA School of Business and Economics is ranked 30th among the best European Business Schools according to the Financial Times ranking.

NOVA is also actively involved in cooperation actions promoted by the Portuguese Government, in particular with North-American universities such as the University of Texas at Austin (UTA), the Massachusetts Institute of Technology (MIT) and Carnegie Mellon University (CMU), namely in master's courses and doctoral and research programmes.

== Rankings ==
University rankings

Global – Overall
- ARWU World: 601–700 (2023)
- QS World: 327 (2026)
- THE World: 501–600 (2024)
- USNWR Global: =487 (2023)

In 2014, THE-QS World University Rankings has evaluated NOVA as one of the world's best universities being ranked number 312 in the world. NOVA is the only Portuguese university in the QS Top 50 under 50 ranking, having reached this position for the third year in a row.

The Times Higher Education 100 Under 50 Rankings 2015 placed NOVA as the 89th best university in the world under 50 years old. The results achieved in the main rankings of universities under 50 years have granted NOVA the inclusion in Yerun network (Young European Research Universities Network).

The Nova School of Business and Economics which has expanded and internationalized itself as a global business school, is the only business school in Portugal to have achieved Eduniversal's 5 palmes distinction, being placed among the top 100 Business Schools worldwide. It was also classified as #23rd in Europe by the Financial Times ranking for the best Business Schools in Europe in 2015.

NOVA was also highlighted for 100% of its professors having a PhD and its gender and international diversity, with 40% women in the faculty and 29% professors of a foreign nationality.

Nova SBE's Master's of Finance is the #19th best in the world by the Financial Times, the Master's in Economics is the 5th best in the world by Eduniversal rankings, and the 17th best Master's in Management in the world by the Financial Times.

== Notable alumni ==
- Manuel João Ramos, anthropologist and civil rights advocate

== See also ==
- List of Jesuit sites
- List of universities in Portugal
- Higher education in Portugal
