= List of diplomatic missions of Portugal =

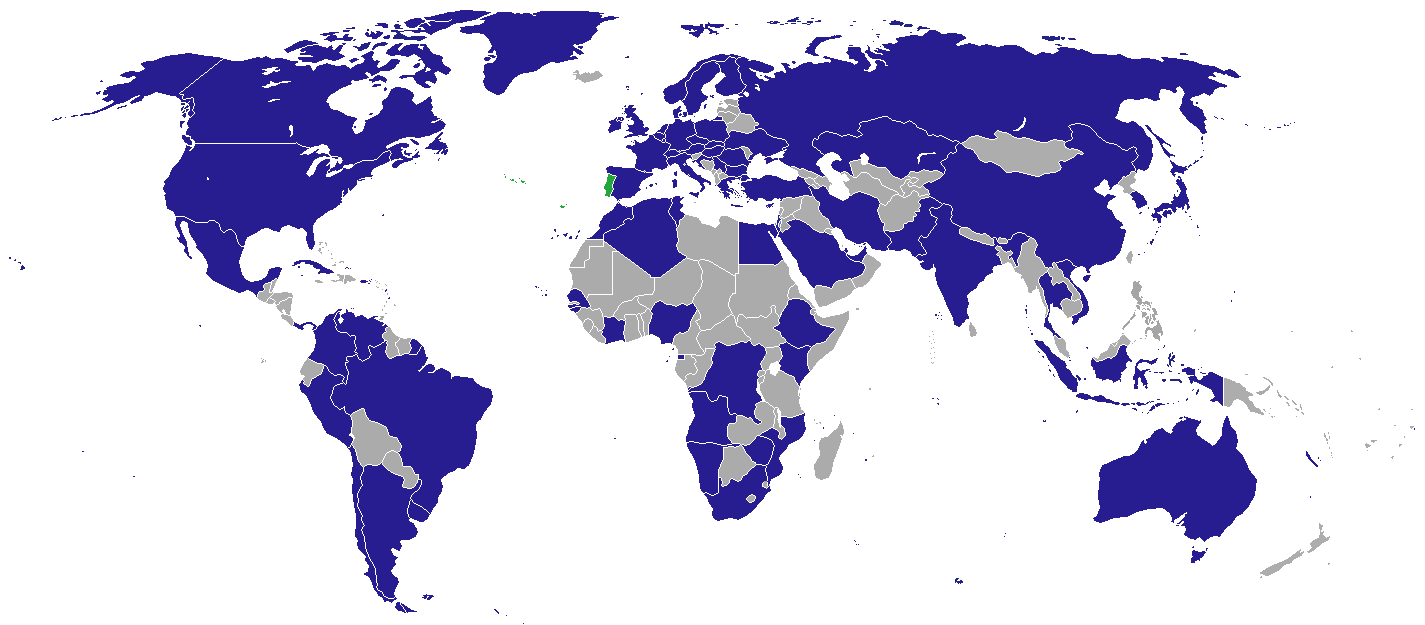
Diplomatic missions of Portugal.

The diplomatic network of the Portuguese Republic is shaped by both its current interests in Europe and its historical linkages to its former overseas provinces in Africa, South America, and Asia. This is reflected in its choice of cities in Asia where Portugal has opened missions – there are Portuguese missions in Dili, Macau, and Panaji. Following the restoration of diplomatic relations with Indonesia in 1999, broken after the 1975 Indonesian invasion of East Timor, there is now an embassy in Jakarta.

Circa 2006, the Portuguese government announced plans to close many of its consular missions, particularly in France and the United States, where there are consulates in comparatively small cities such as New Bedford and Providence whose links to Portugal are based on receiving Luso-American immigrants in the nineteenth century. This met with opposition from many people of Portuguese origin in Massachusetts and Rhode Island, as well as Congressman Barney Frank.

The former Foreign Minister, Luís Amado, proposed reprioritising its diplomatic network in order to deepen diplomatic engagement in Asia, Africa and the Middle East. He proposed closing missions in Bosnia and Herzegovina, Bulgaria, Croatia, Cyprus, Estonia, Kenya, Lithuania, Latvia, Malta, Peru, Serbia, Slovenia, Ukraine, and Uruguay, and opening missions in Bahrain, Botswana, Equatorial Guinea, Jordan, Kuwait, Namibia, New Zealand, Philippines, Qatar, Syria, United Arab Emirates and Vietnam.

== Current missions ==
=== Africa ===
Host country	Host city	Mission	Concurrent accreditation	Ref.
Algeria	Algiers	Embassy		
Angola	Luanda	Embassy		
Angola	Benguela	Consulate-General		
Cape Verde	Praia	Embassy		
Cape Verde	Mindelo	Consular office		
Congo-Kinshasa	Kinshasa	Embassy	Countries: Central African Republic; Congo-Brazzaville; Uganda	
Egypt	Cairo	Embassy	Countries: Eritrea; Jordan; Sudan	
Equatorial Guinea	Malabo	Embassy		
Ethiopia	Addis Ababa	Embassy	Countries: Comoros; Djibouti; Rwanda; South Sudan; International Organizations: African Union (Note: Accredited as an observer mission.)	
Guinea-Bissau	Bissau	Embassy		
Ivory Coast	Abidjan	Embassy	Countries: Ghana; Liberia; Togo	
Kenya	Nairobi	Embassy	Countries: Burundi; Somalia; International Organizations: United Nations; United Nations Environment Programme; United Nations Human Settlements Programme	
Morocco	Rabat	Embassy	Countries: Mauritania	
Mozambique	Maputo	Embassy	Countries: Eswatini; Mauritius; Seychelles; Tanzania	
Mozambique	Beira	Consulate-General	Countries: Eswatini; Mauritius; Seychelles; Tanzania	
Namibia	Windhoek	Embassy		
Nigeria	Abuja	Embassy	Countries: Benin; Chad; Cameroon; Niger	
São Tomé and Príncipe	São Tomé	Embassy	Countries: Gabon	
Senegal	Dakar	Embassy	Countries: Burkina Faso; Gambia; Guinea; Mali; Sierra Leone	
South Africa	Pretoria	Embassy	Countries: Botswana; Lesotho; Madagascar	
South Africa	Cape Town	Consulate-General	Countries: Botswana; Lesotho; Madagascar	
South Africa	Johannesburg	Consulate-General	Countries: Botswana; Lesotho; Madagascar	
Tunisia	Tunis	Embassy	Countries: Libya	
Zimbabwe	Harare	Embassy	Countries: Malawi; Zambia	

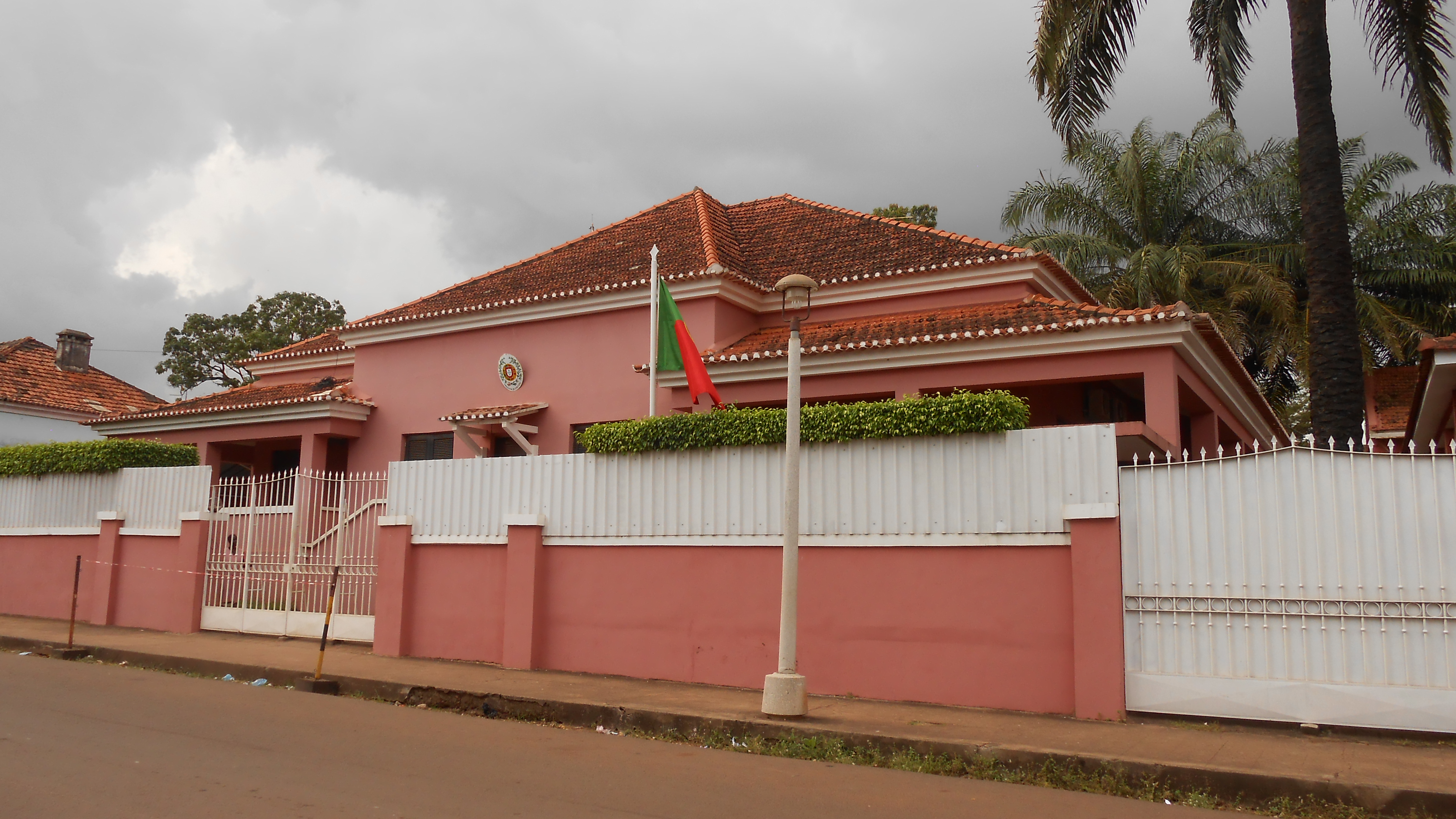
Embassy in Bissau

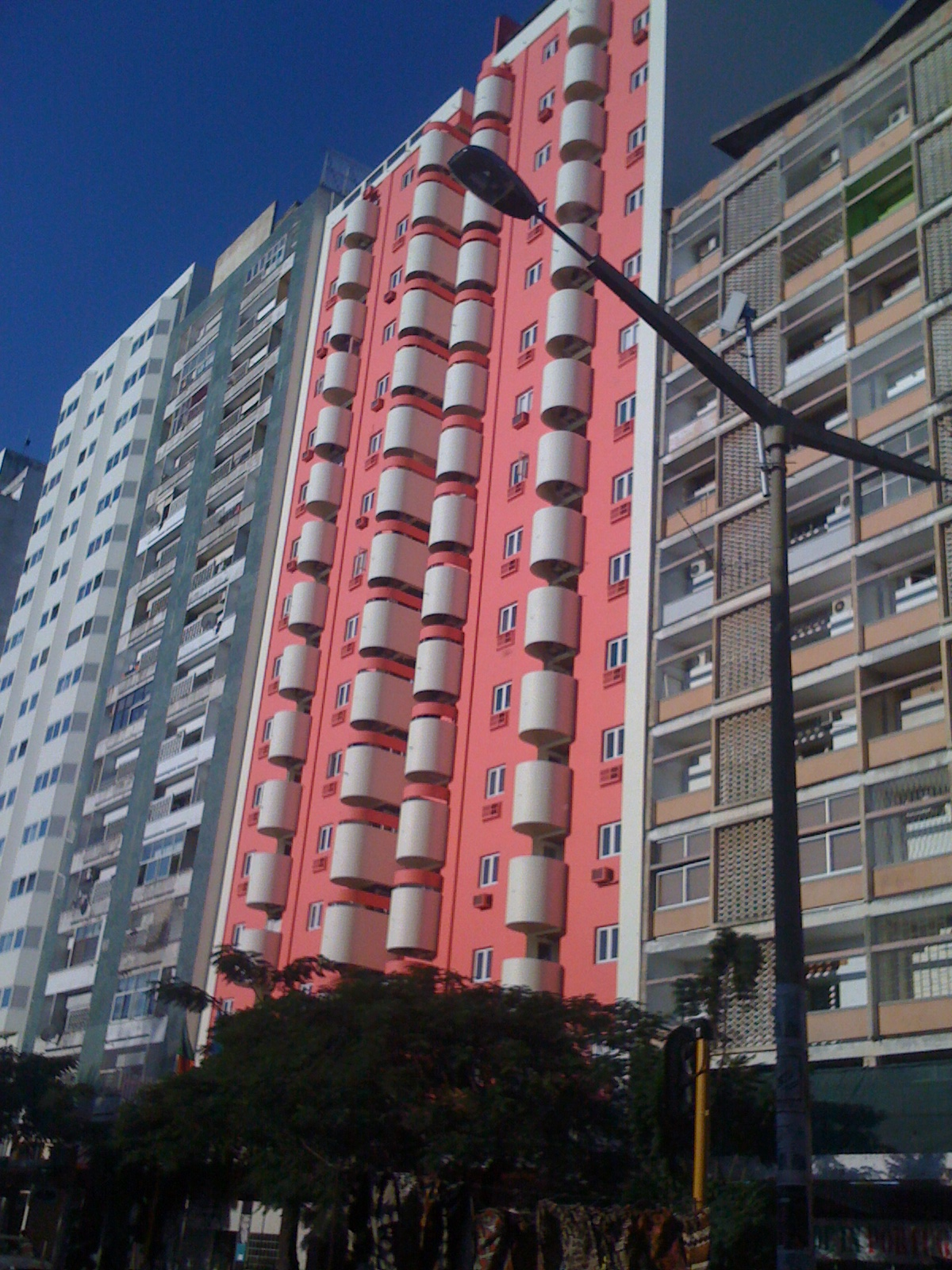
Embassy in Maputo

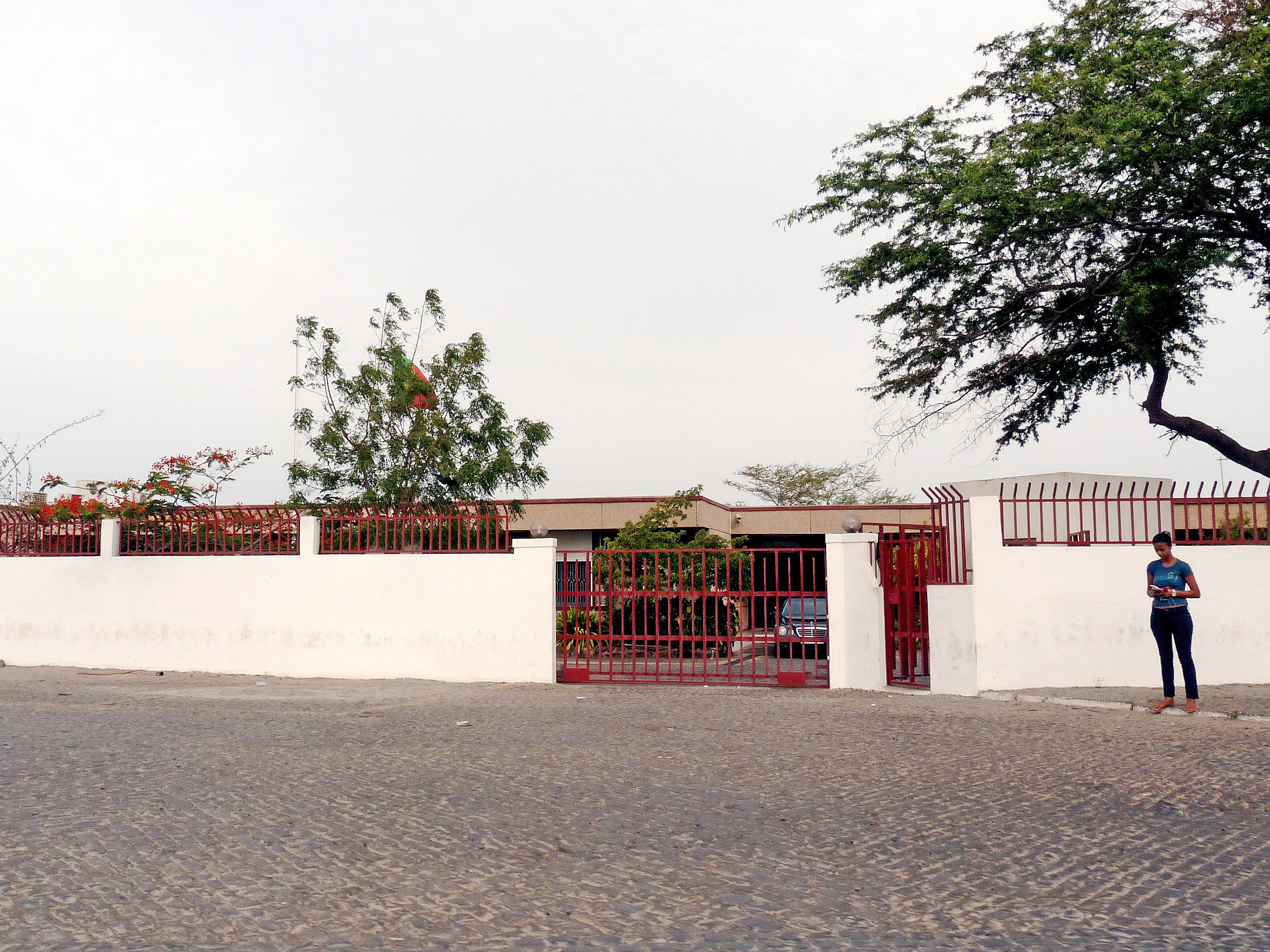
Embassy in Praia

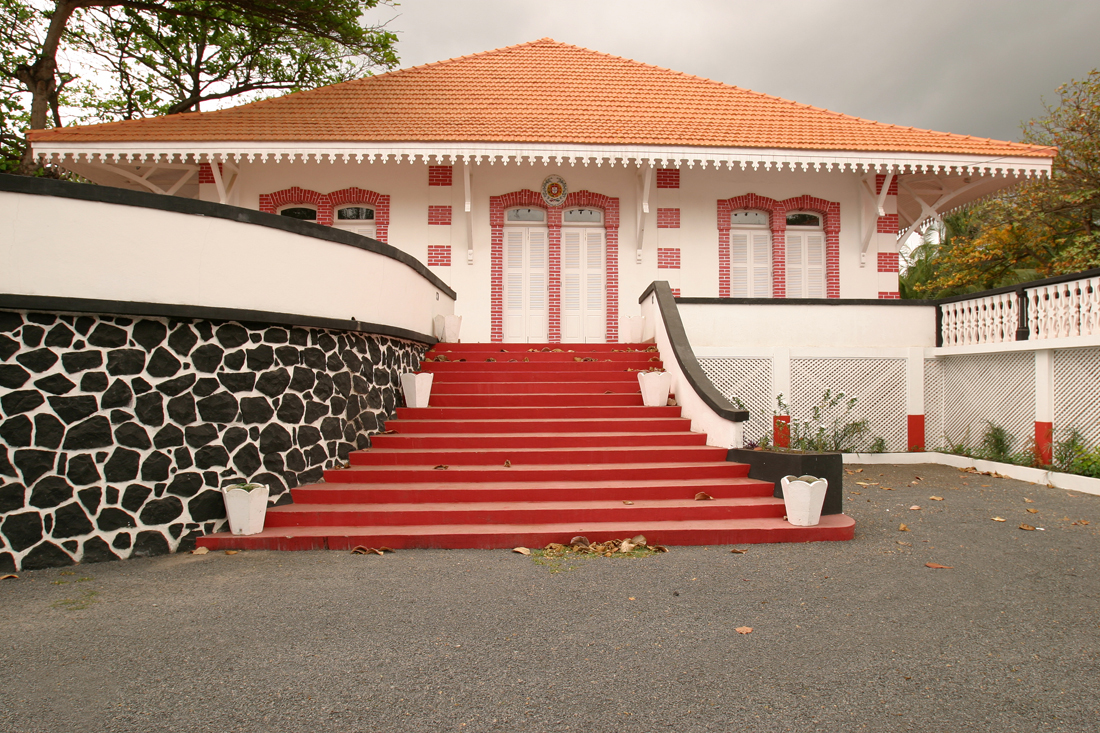
Embassy in São Tomé

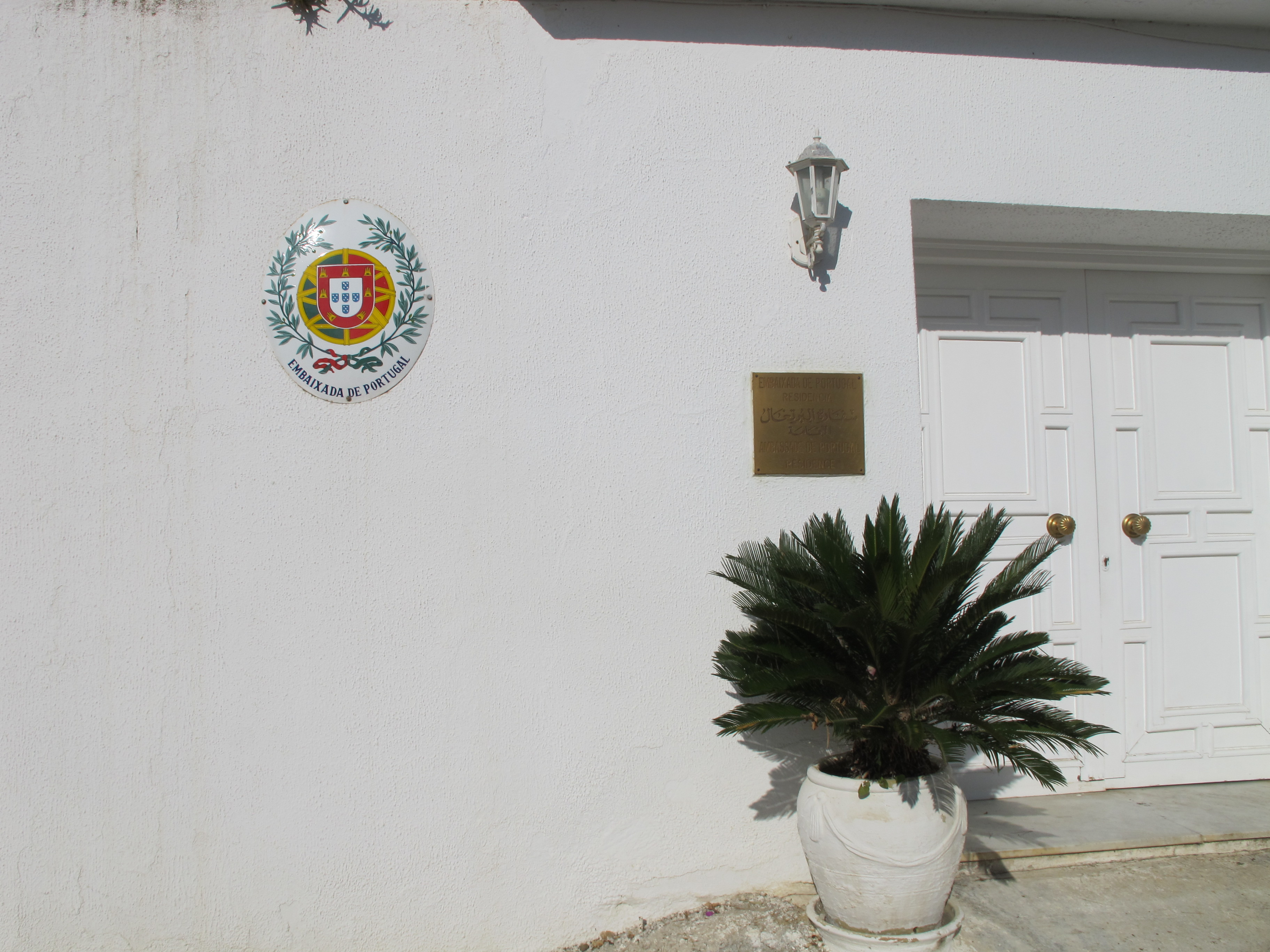
Embassy in Tunis

=== Americas ===
Host country	Host city	Mission	Concurrent accreditation	Ref.
Argentina	Buenos Aires	Embassy	Countries: Paraguay	
Brazil	Brasília	Embassy		
Brazil	Recife	Consulate-General		
Brazil	Rio de Janeiro	Consulate-General		
Brazil	Salvador	Consulate-General		
Brazil	São Paulo	Consulate-General		
Brazil	Belém	Consulate		
Brazil	Belo Horizonte	Consulate		
Brazil	Curitiba	Consulate		
Brazil	Fortaleza	Consulate		
Brazil	Porto Alegre	Consulate		
Brazil	Santos	Consular office		
Canada	Ottawa	Embassy		
Canada	Montreal	Consulate-General		
Canada	Toronto	Consulate-General		
Canada	Vancouver	Consulate-General		
Chile	Santiago de Chile	Embassy		
Colombia	Bogotá	Embassy	Countries: Dominica; Ecuador; Saint Lucia	
Cuba	Havana	Embassy	Countries: Haiti	
Mexico	Mexico City	Embassy	Countries: Belize; Dominican Republic; El Salvador; Guatemala; Honduras	
Panama	Panama City	Embassy	Countries: Costa Rica; Nicaragua	
Peru	Lima	Embassy	Countries: Bolivia	
United States	Washington, D.C.	Embassy	Countries: Bahamas; International Organizations: Organization of American States	
United States	Boston	Consulate-General	Countries: Bahamas; International Organizations: Organization of American States	
United States	New York City	Consulate-General	Countries: Bahamas; International Organizations: Organization of American States	
United States	Newark	Consulate-General	Countries: Bahamas; International Organizations: Organization of American States	
United States	San Francisco	Consulate-General	Countries: Bahamas; International Organizations: Organization of American States	
United States	New Bedford	Consulate	Countries: Bahamas; International Organizations: Organization of American States	
United States	Providence	Consulate	Countries: Bahamas; International Organizations: Organization of American States	
Uruguay	Montevideo	Embassy		
Venezuela	Caracas	Embassy	Countries: Antigua and Barbuda; Barbados; Guyana; Jamaica; Saint Kitts and Nevis; Saint Vincent and the Grenadines; Suriname; Trinidad and Tobago; International Organizations: Caribbean Community	
Venezuela	Valencia	Consulate-General	Countries: Antigua and Barbuda; Barbados; Guyana; Jamaica; Saint Kitts and Nevis; Saint Vincent and the Grenadines; Suriname; Trinidad and Tobago; International Organizations: Caribbean Community	

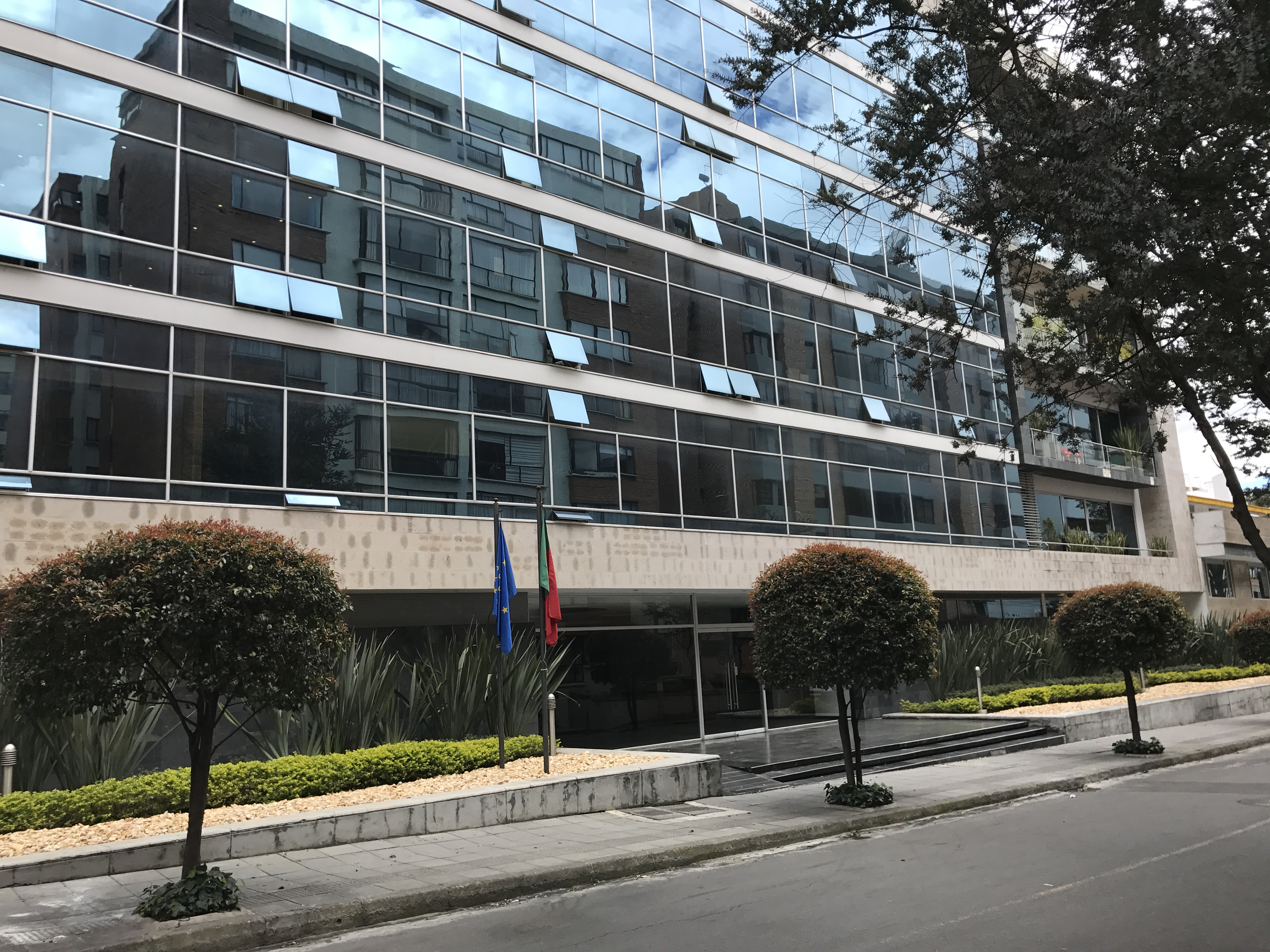
Embassy in Bogotá

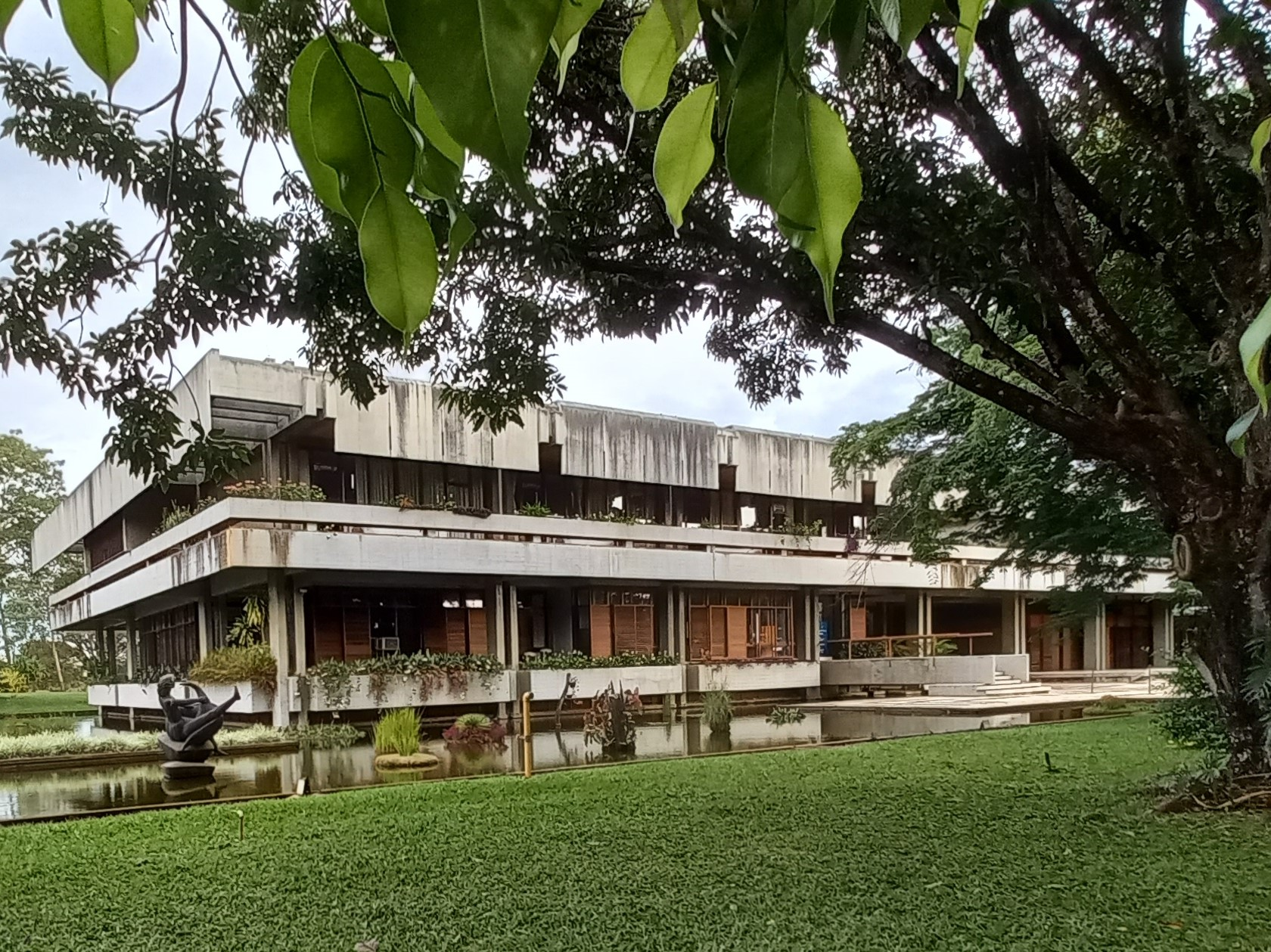
Embassy in Brasília

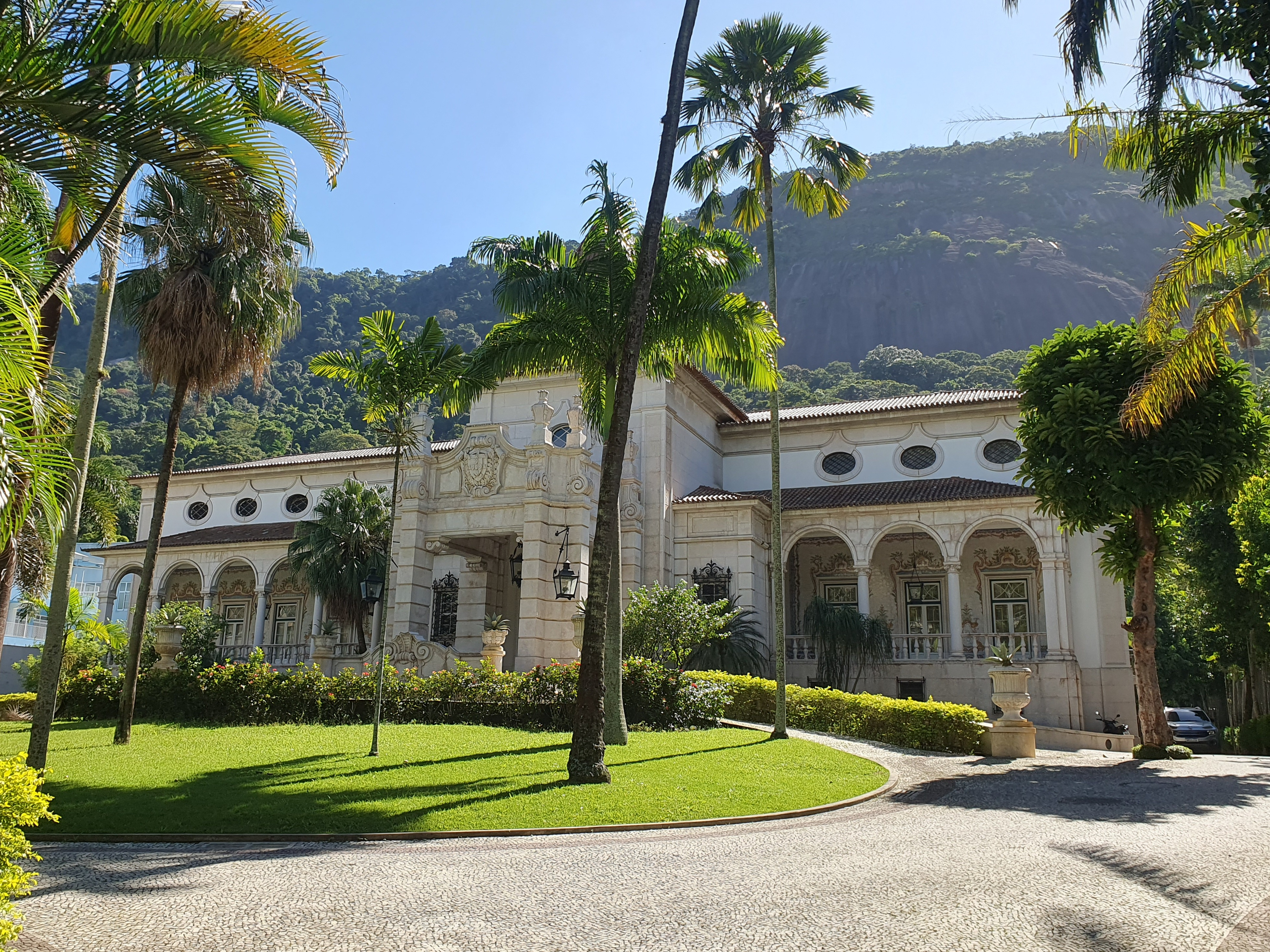
Consulate-General in Rio de Janeiro

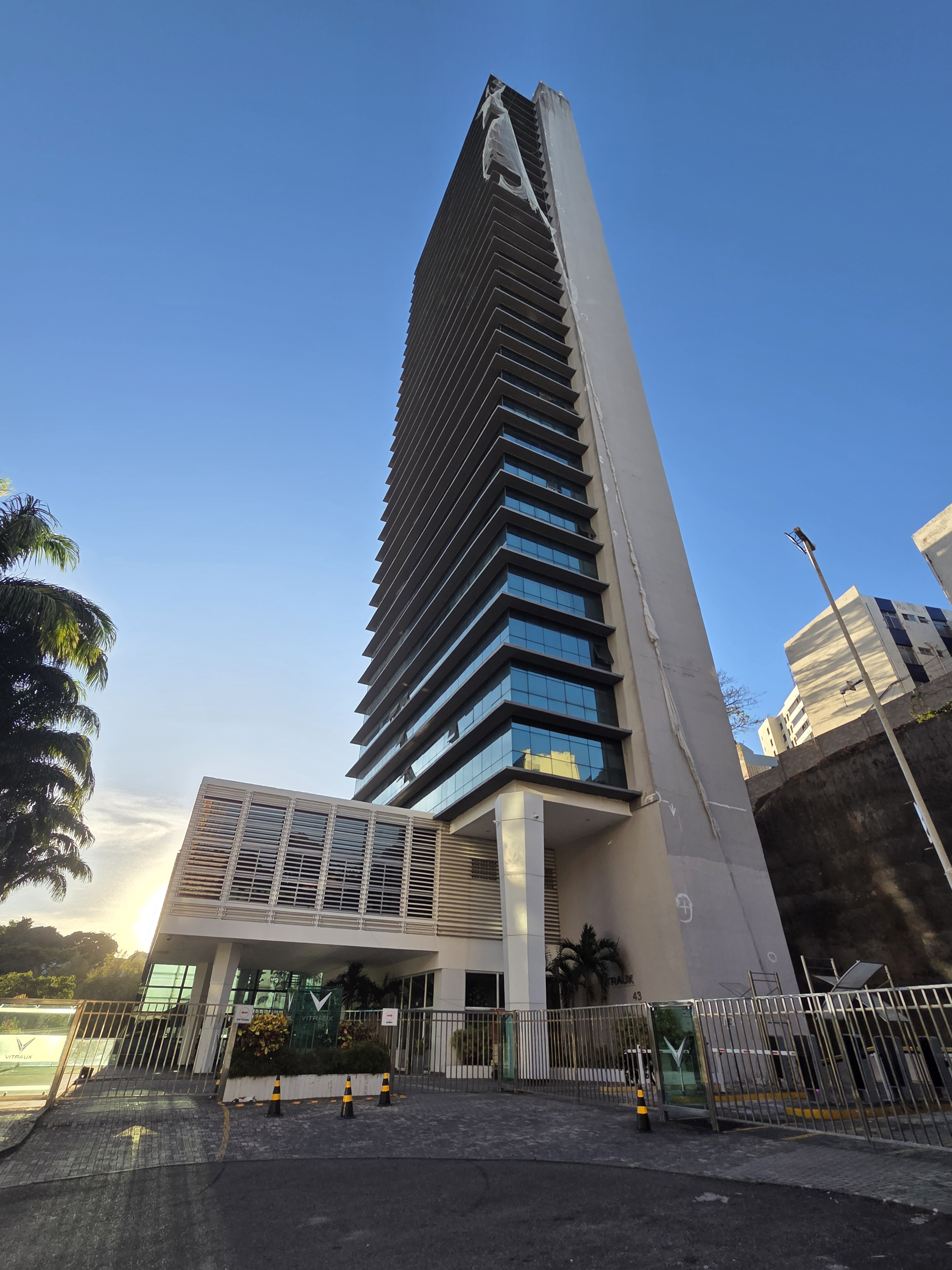
Building hosting the Consulate-General in Salvador da Bahia

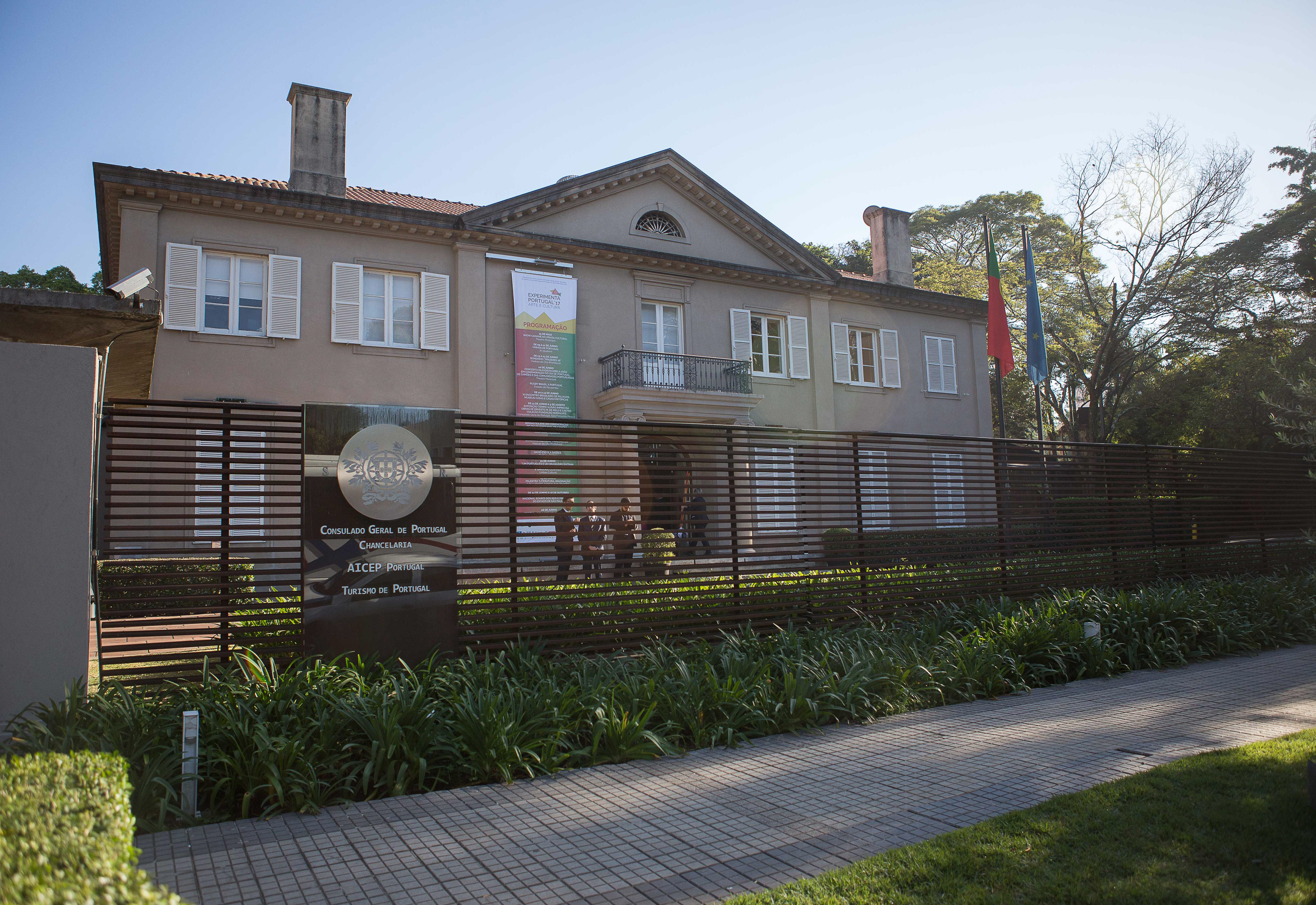
Consulate-General in São Paulo

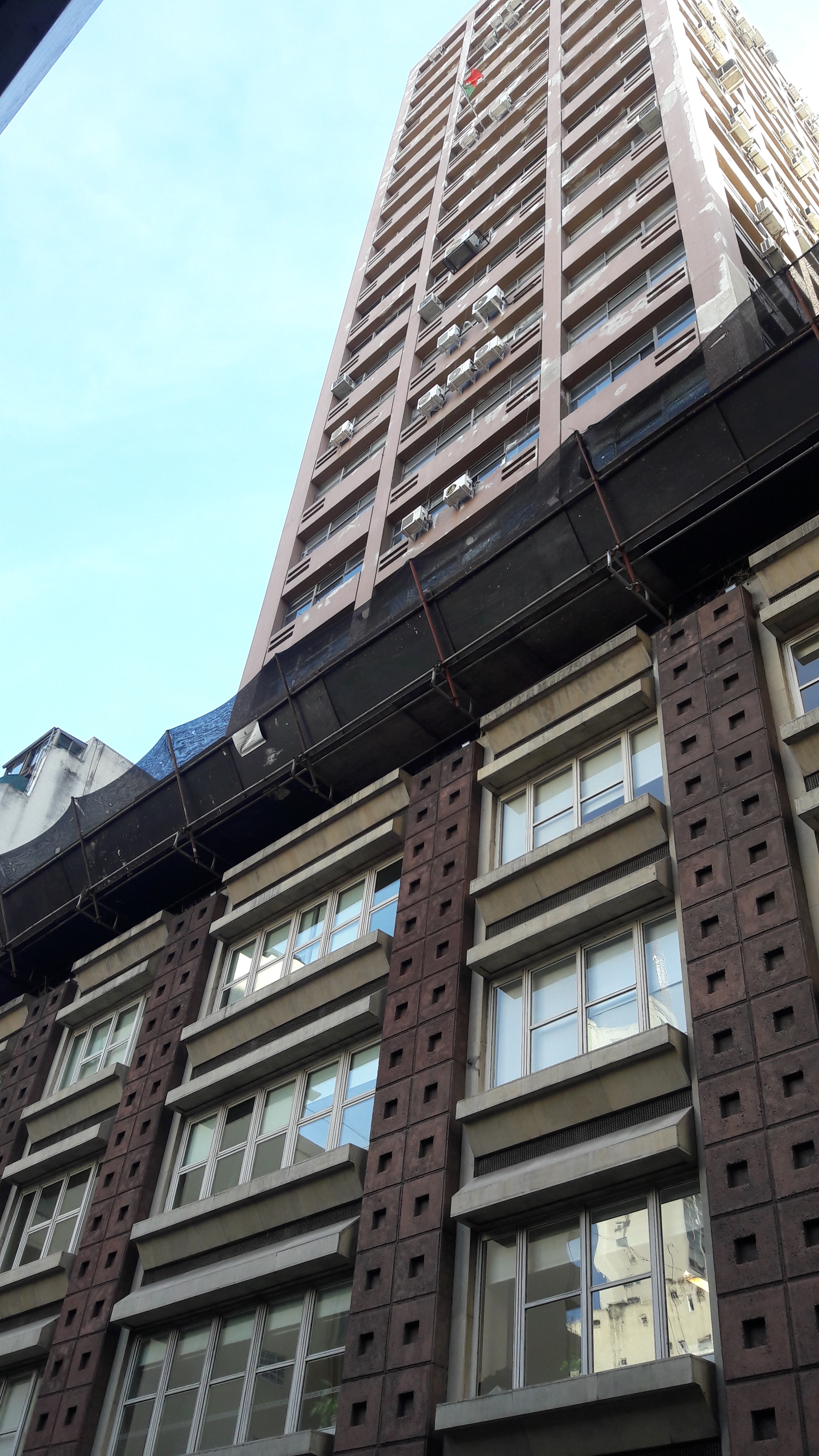
Building hosting the Embassy in Buenos Aires

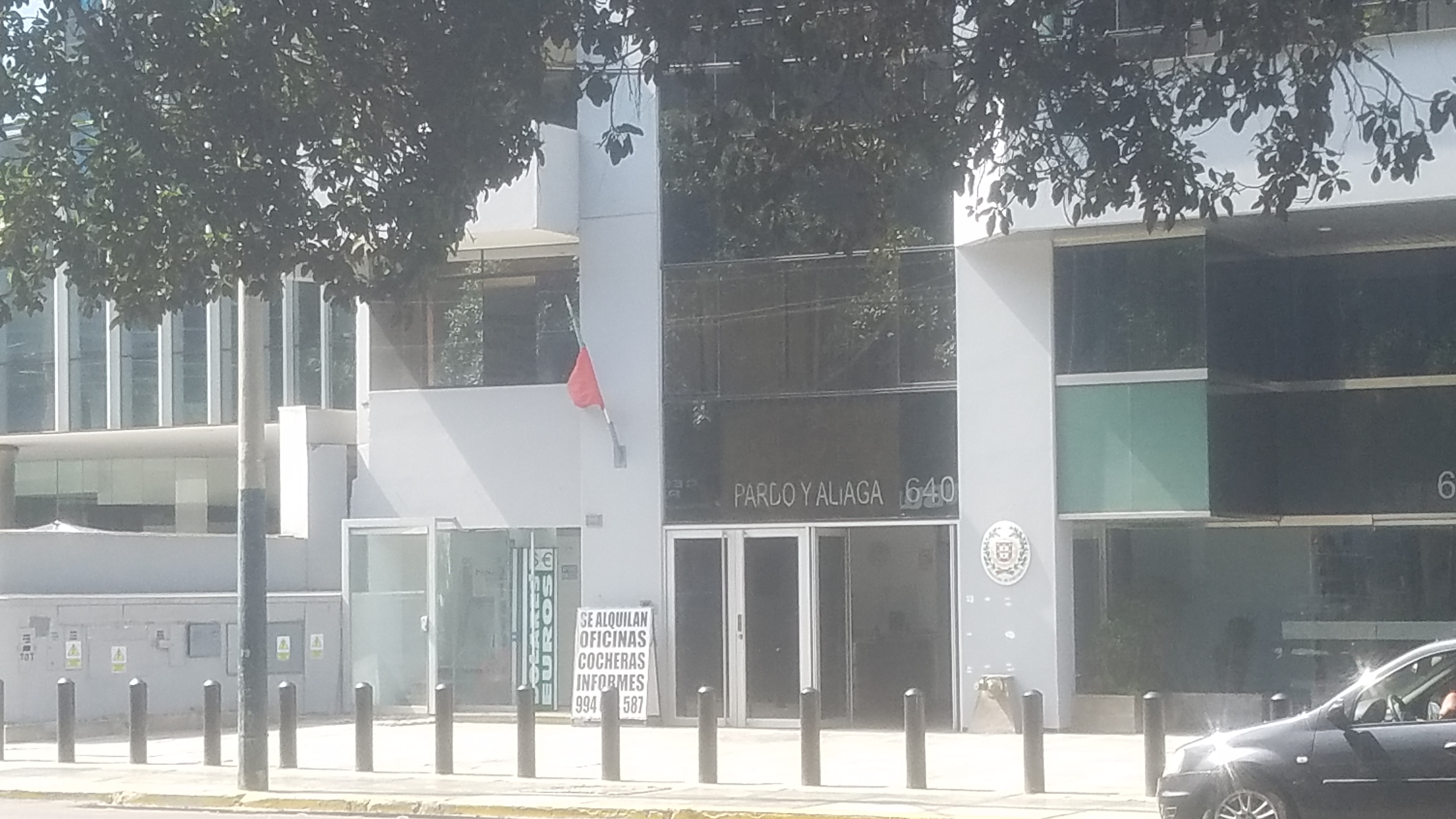
Embassy in Lima

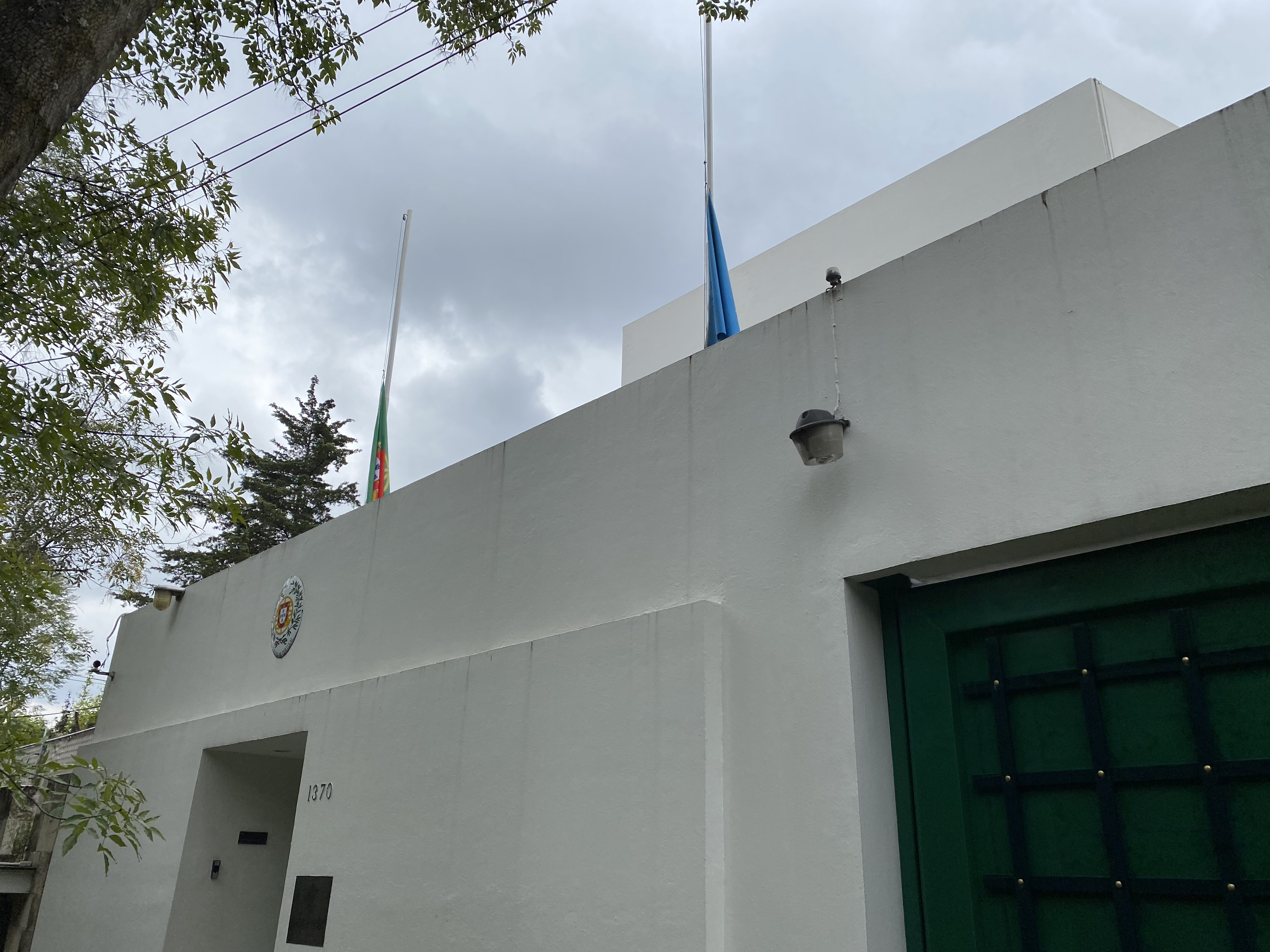
Embassy in Mexico City

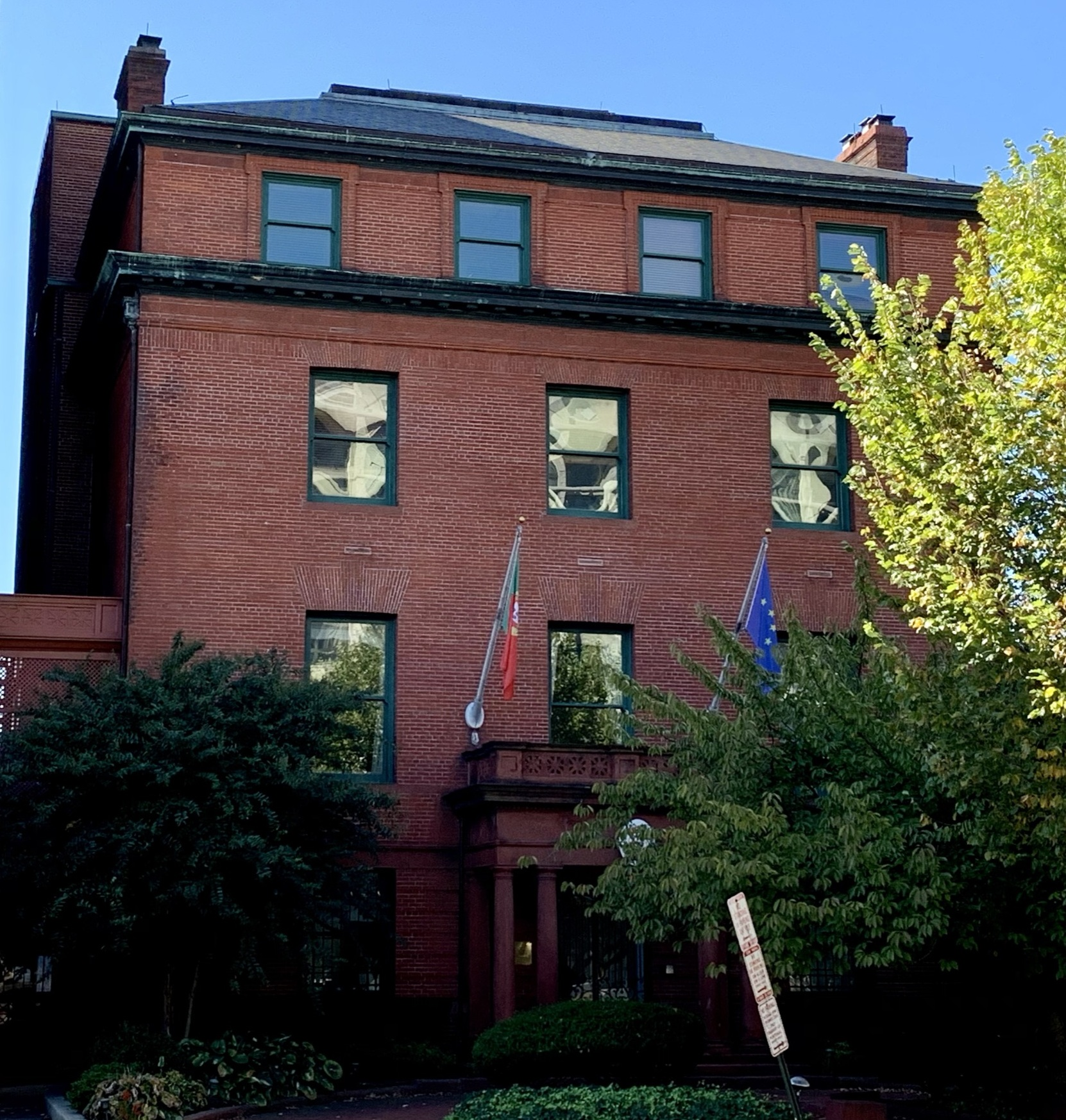
Embassy in Washington, D.C.

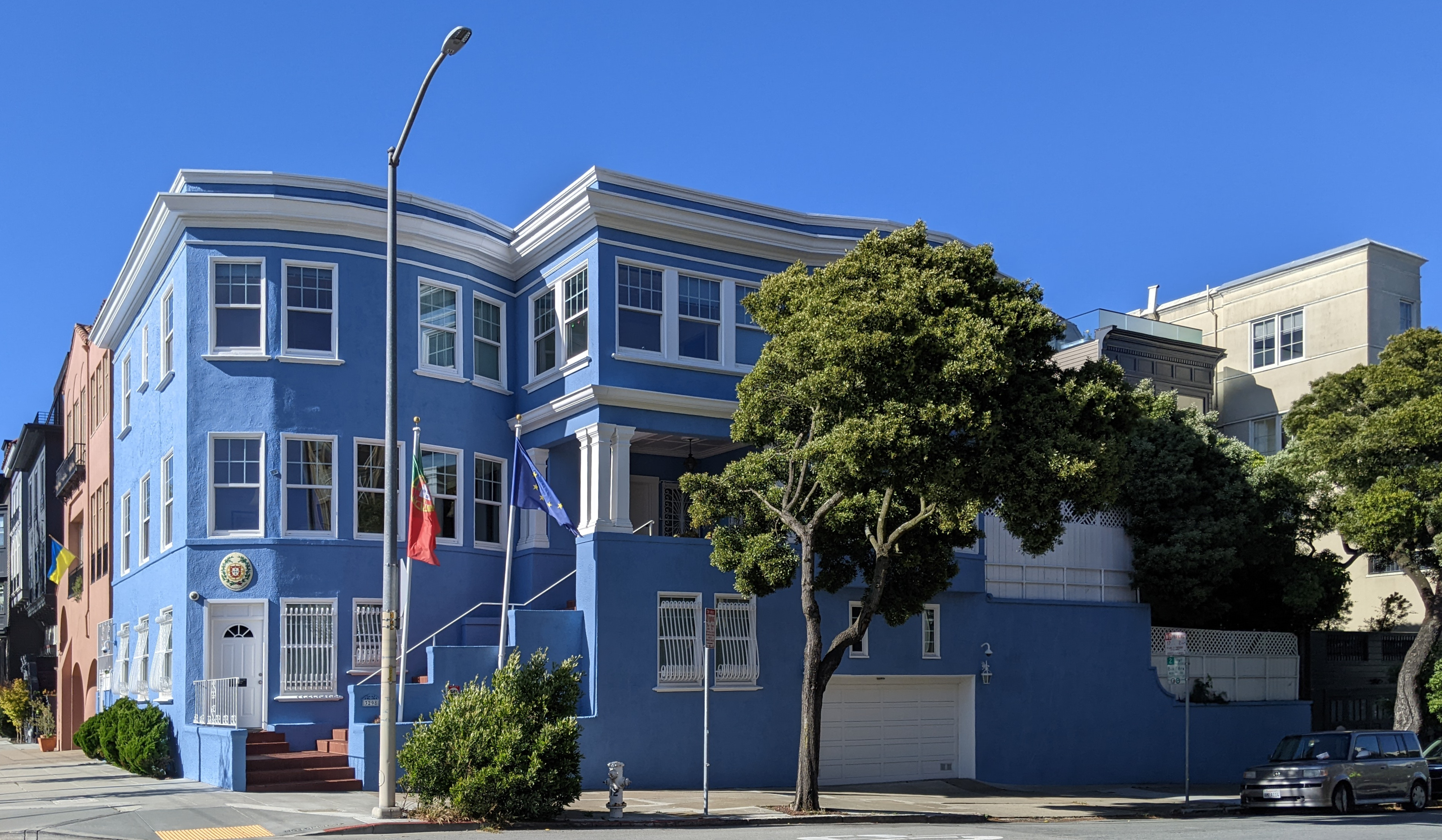
Consulate-General in San Francisco

=== Asia ===
Host country	Host city	Mission	Concurrent accreditation	Ref.
China	Beijing	Embassy	Countries: Mongolia	
China	Guangzhou	Consulate-General	Countries: Mongolia	
China	Macau	Consulate-General	Countries: Mongolia	
China	Shanghai	Consulate-General	Countries: Mongolia	
India	New Delhi	Embassy	Countries: Bangladesh; Bhutan; Maldives; Nepal; Sri Lanka	
India	Panaji	Consulate-General	Countries: Bangladesh; Bhutan; Maldives; Nepal; Sri Lanka	
Indonesia	Jakarta	Embassy	Countries: Brunei; Marshall Islands; Philippines; International Organizations: Association of Southeast Asian Nations	
Iran	Tehran	Embassy		
Israel	Tel Aviv	Embassy		
Japan	Tokyo	Embassy		
Kazakhstan	Astana	Embassy	Countries: Kyrgyzstan; Tajikistan	
Pakistan	Islamabad	Embassy	Countries: Afghanistan	
Palestine	Ramallah	Representative Office		
Qatar	Doha	Embassy	Countries: Oman	
Saudi Arabia	Riyadh	Embassy	Countries: Bahrain; Yemen	
Singapore	Singapore	Embassy		
South Korea	Seoul	Embassy	Countries: North Korea	
Thailand	Bangkok	Embassy	Countries: Cambodia; Laos; Malaysia; Myanmar	
Timor-Leste	Dili	Embassy		
Turkey	Ankara	Embassy	Countries: Azerbaijan; Georgia; Turkmenistan	
United Arab Emirates	Abu Dhabi	Embassy	Countries: Iraq; Kuwait	
Vietnam	Hanoi	Embassy		

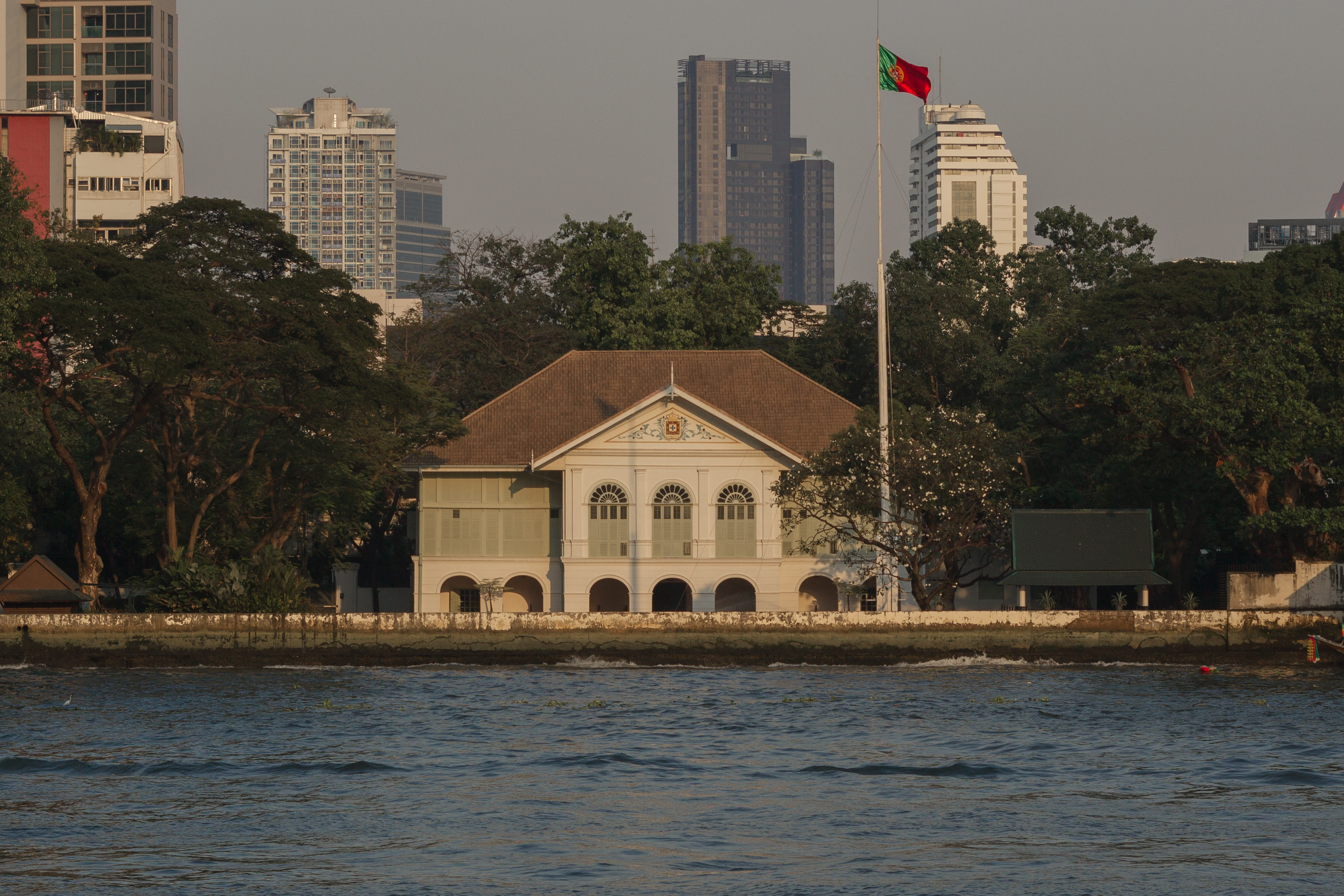
Embassy in Bangkok

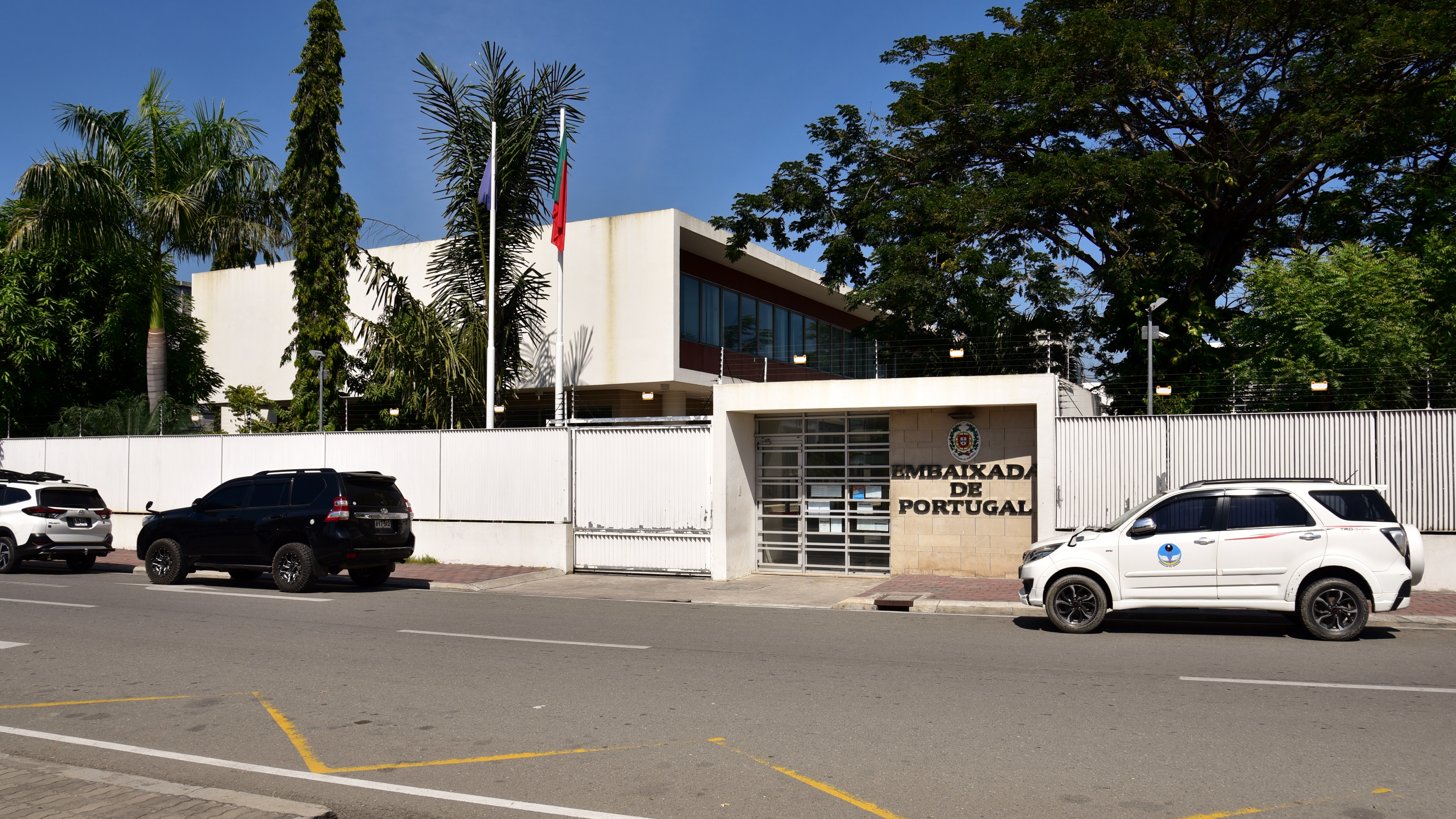
Embassy in Dili

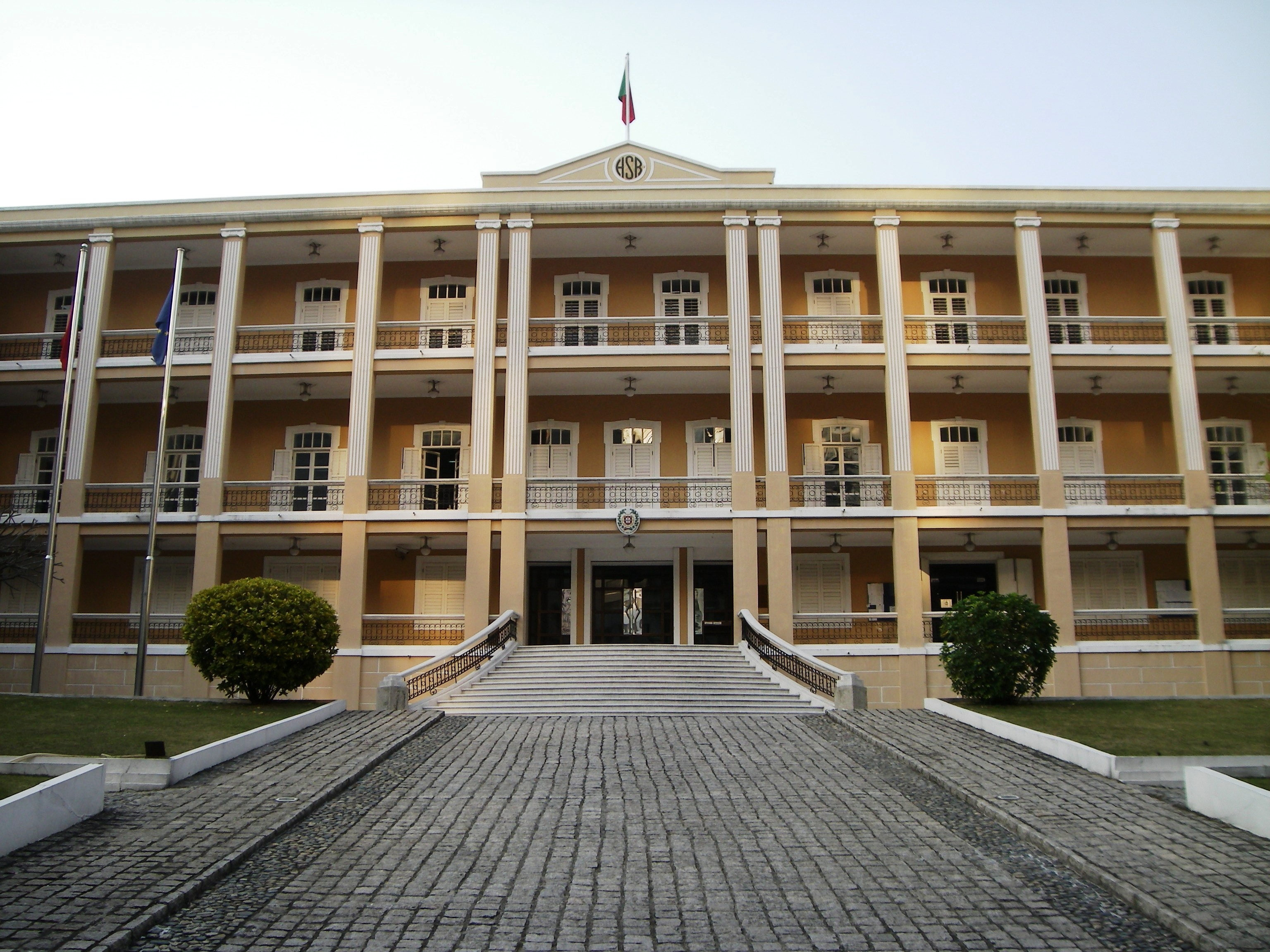
Consulate-General in Macau

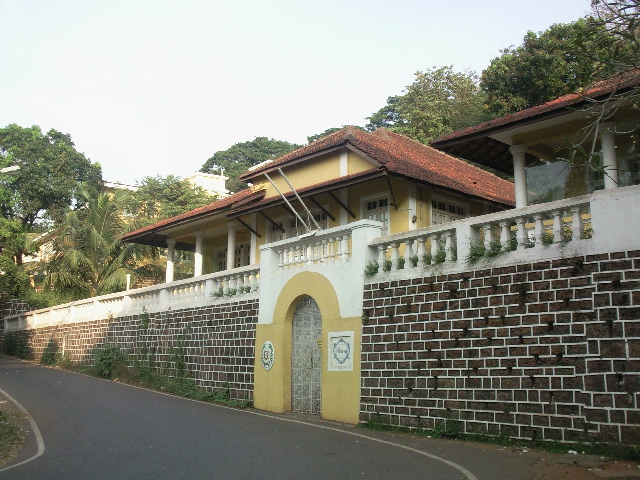
Consulate-General in Panaji

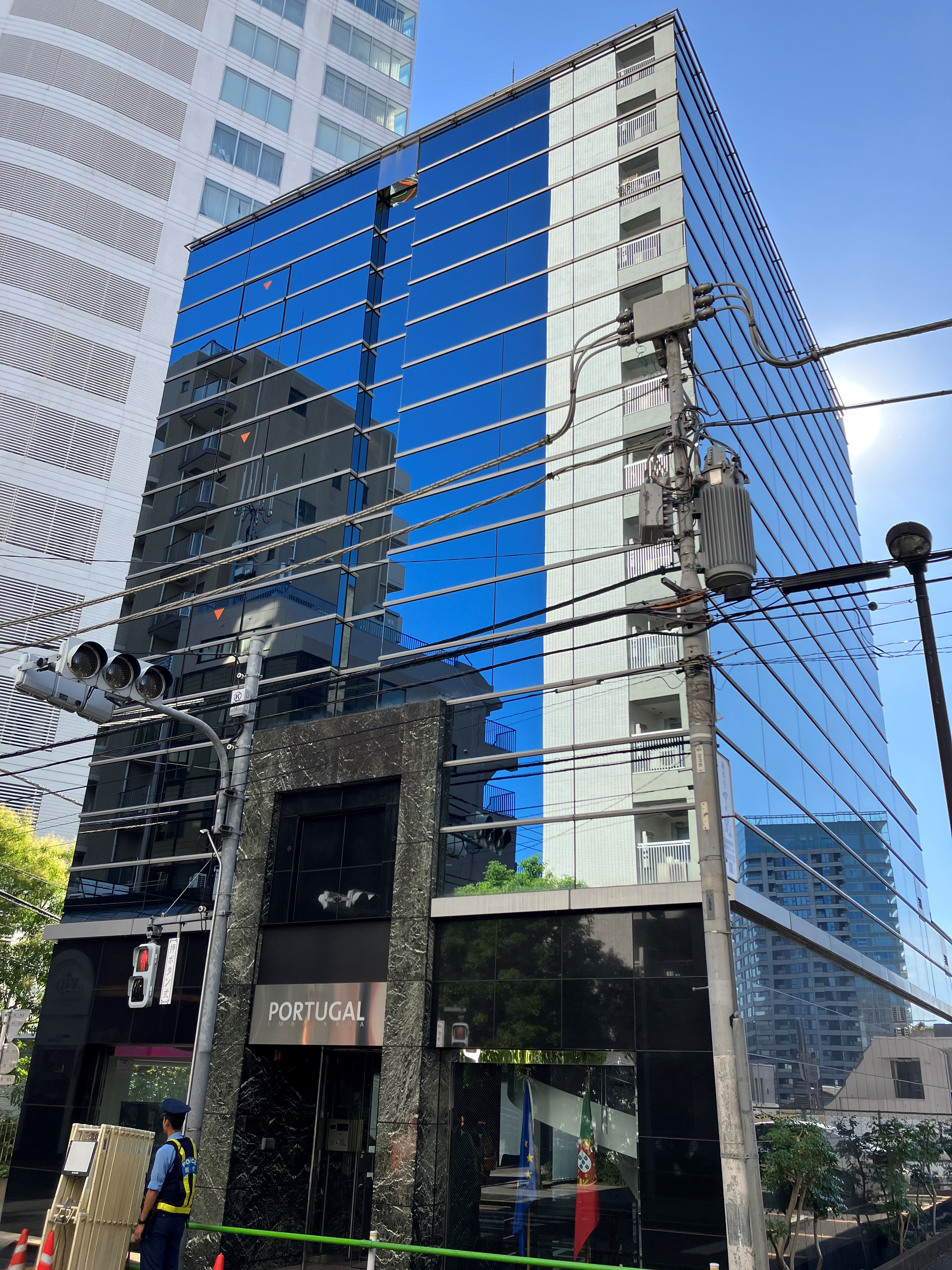
Embassy in Tokyo

=== Europe ===
Host country	Host city	Mission	Concurrent accreditation	Ref.
Andorra	Andorra la Vella	Consulate-General		
Austria	Vienna	Embassy	Countries: Slovenia; International Organizations: United Nations; International Atomic Energy Agency; UNIDO; United Nations Office on Drugs and Crime	
Belgium	Brussels	Embassy		
Bulgaria	Sofia	Embassy		
Croatia	Zagreb	Embassy		
Cyprus	Nicosia	Embassy	Countries: Lebanon; Syria	
Czechia	Prague	Embassy		
Denmark	Copenhagen	Embassy	Countries: Lithuania	
Finland	Helsinki	Embassy	Countries: Estonia	
France	Paris	Embassy	Countries: Monaco	
France	Bordeaux	Consulate-General	Countries: Monaco	
France	Lyon	Consulate-General	Countries: Monaco	
France	Marseille	Consulate-General	Countries: Monaco	
France	Strasbourg	Consulate-General	Countries: Monaco	
France	Toulouse	Vice-consulate	Countries: Monaco	
France	Nantes	Consular office	Countries: Monaco	
Germany	Berlin	Embassy		
Germany	Düsseldorf	Consulate-General		
Germany	Hamburg	Consulate-General		
Germany	Stuttgart	Consulate-General		
Germany	Frankfurt	Consular office		
Greece	Athens	Embassy		
Holy See	Rome (Note: The Portuguese Embassy to the Holy See is located outside Vatican territory in Rome.)	Embassy	Sovereign Entity: Sovereign Military Order of Malta	
Hungary	Budapest	Embassy	Countries: Bosnia and Herzegovina; Kosovo	
Ireland	Dublin	Embassy		
Italy	Rome	Embassy	Countries: Albania; Malta; San Marino; International Organizations: Food and Agriculture Organization; International Fund for Agricultural Development; World Food Programme	
Luxembourg	Luxembourg City	Embassy		
Netherlands	The Hague	Embassy	International Organizations: Organisation for the Prohibition of Chemical Weapons	
Norway	Oslo	Embassy	Countries: Iceland	
Poland	Warsaw	Embassy		
Romania	Bucharest	Embassy	Countries: Moldova	
Russia	Moscow	Embassy	Countries: Armenia; Belarus; Uzbekistan	
Serbia	Belgrade	Embassy	Countries: Montenegro; North Macedonia	
Slovakia	Bratislava	Embassy		
Spain	Madrid	Embassy	Countries: Andorra	
Spain	Barcelona	Consulate-General	Countries: Andorra	
Spain	Seville	Consulate-General	Countries: Andorra	
Spain	Vigo	Consulate-General	Countries: Andorra	
Sweden	Stockholm	Embassy	Countries: Latvia	
Switzerland	Bern	Embassy	Countries: Liechtenstein	
Switzerland	Geneva	Consulate-General	Countries: Liechtenstein	
Switzerland	Zurich	Consulate-General	Countries: Liechtenstein	
Switzerland	Lugano	Consular office	Countries: Liechtenstein	
Switzerland	Sion	Consular office	Countries: Liechtenstein	
Ukraine	Kyiv	Embassy		
United Kingdom	London	Embassy		
United Kingdom	Manchester	Consulate-General		

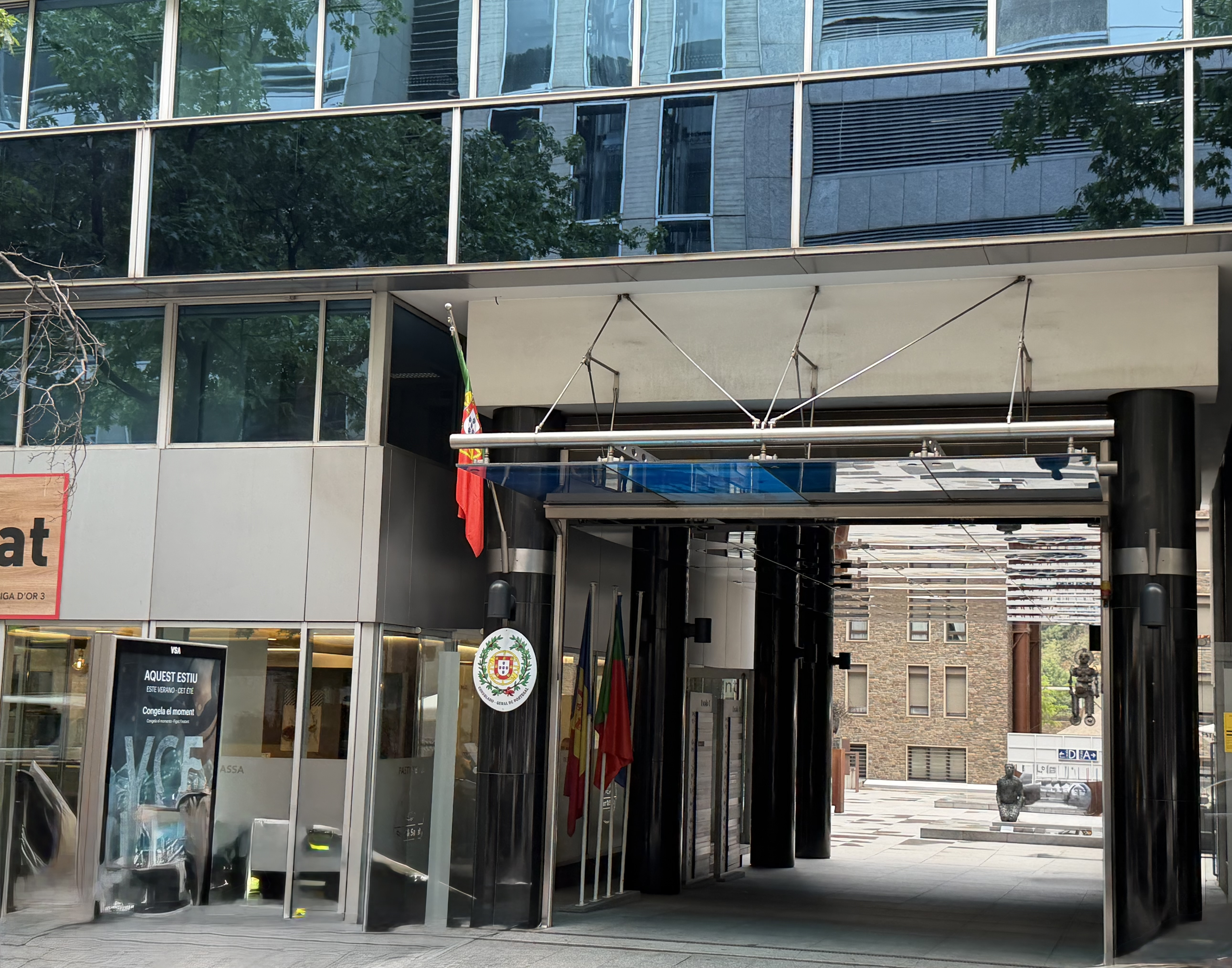
Consulate-General in Andorra la Vella

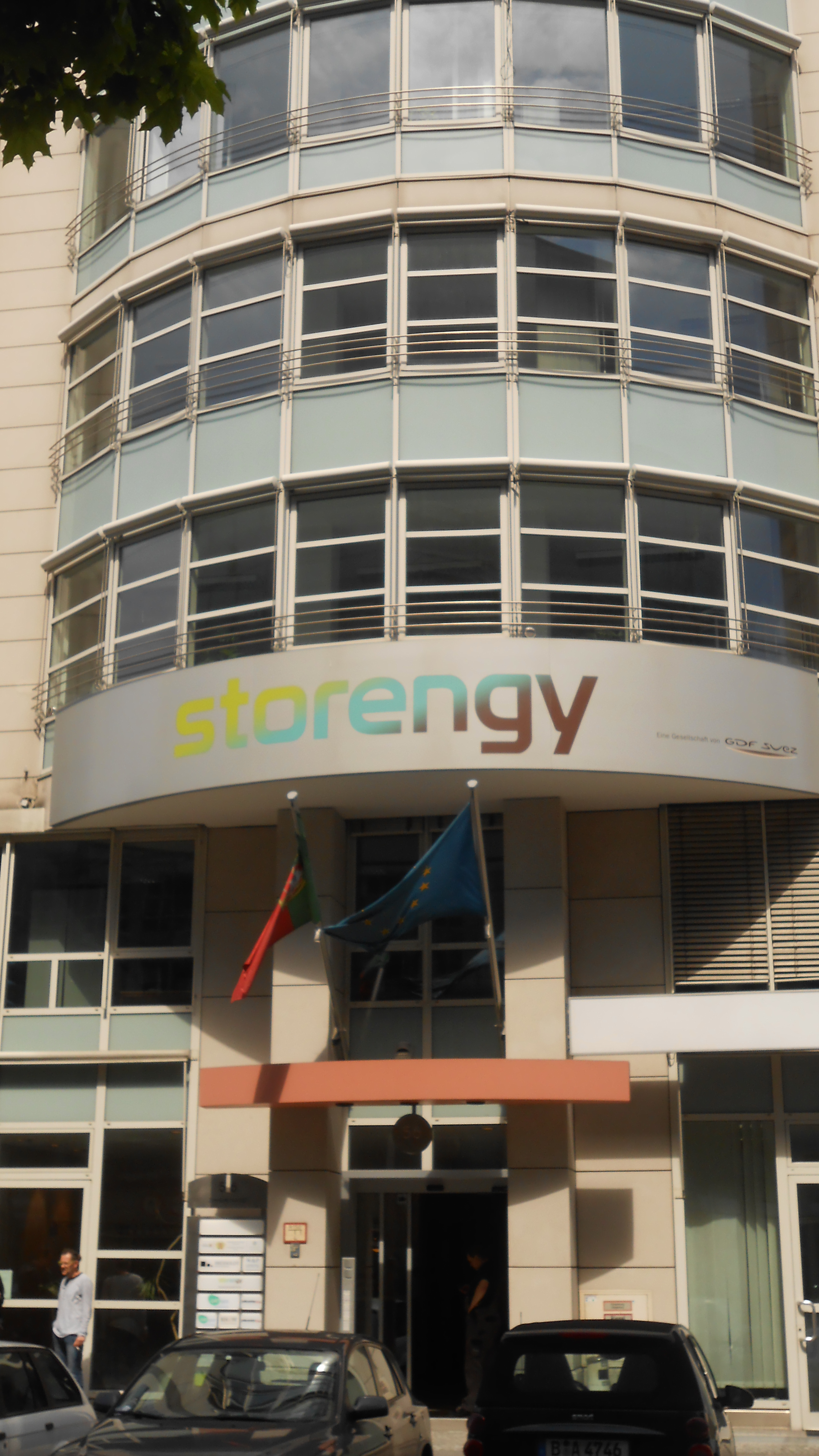
Building hosting the Embassy in Berlin

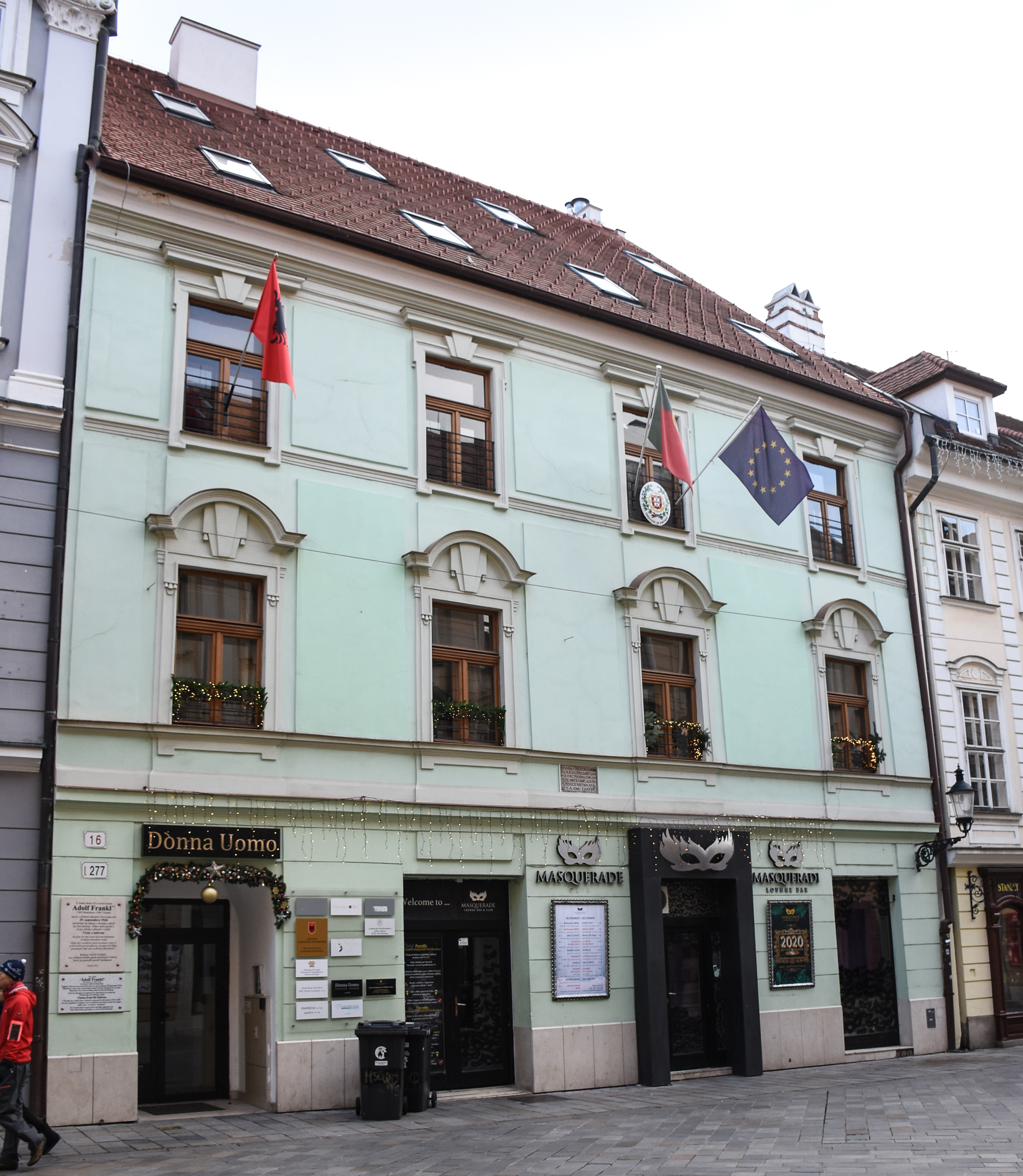
Building hosting the Embassy in Bratislava

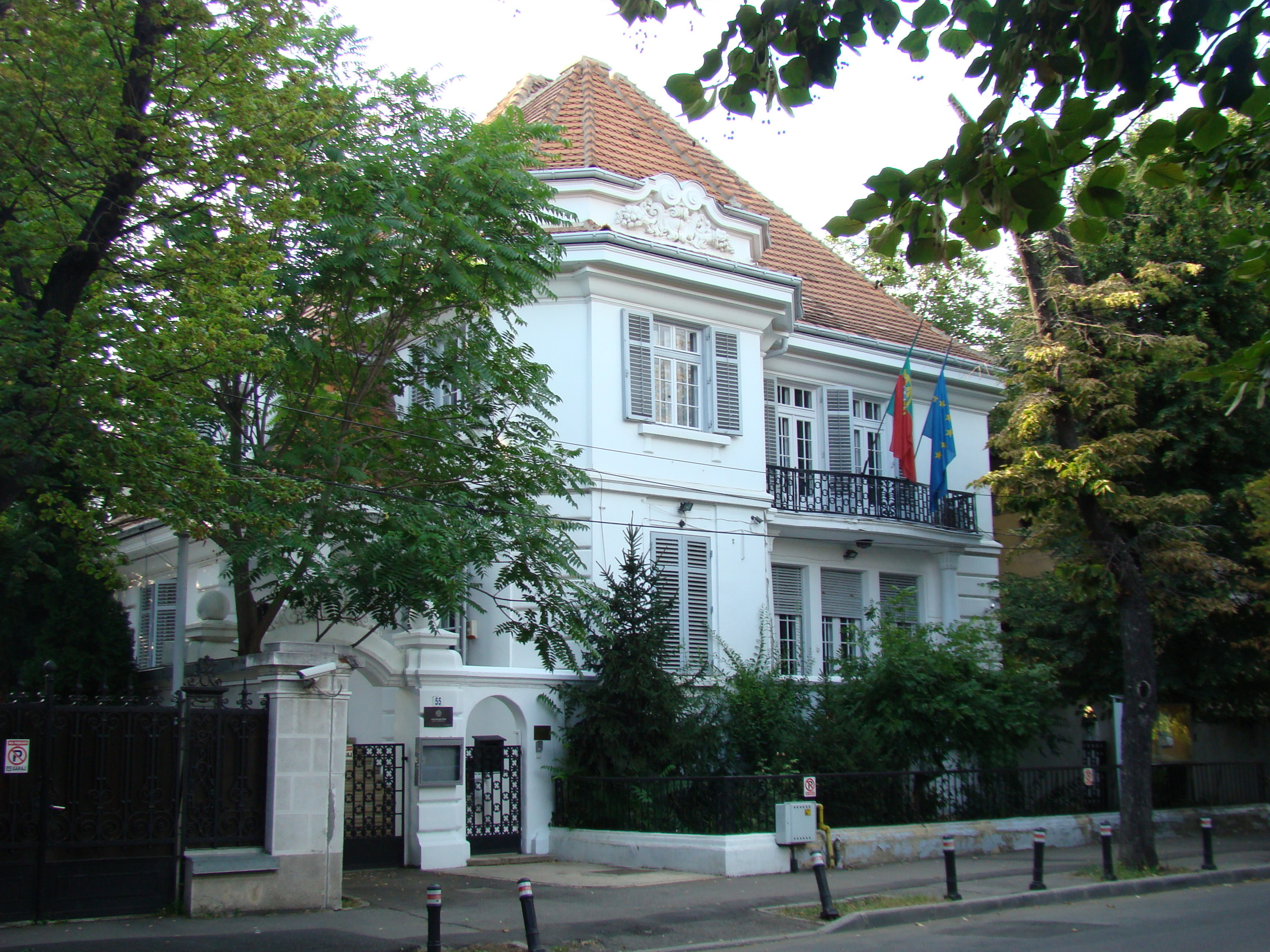
Embassy in Bucharest

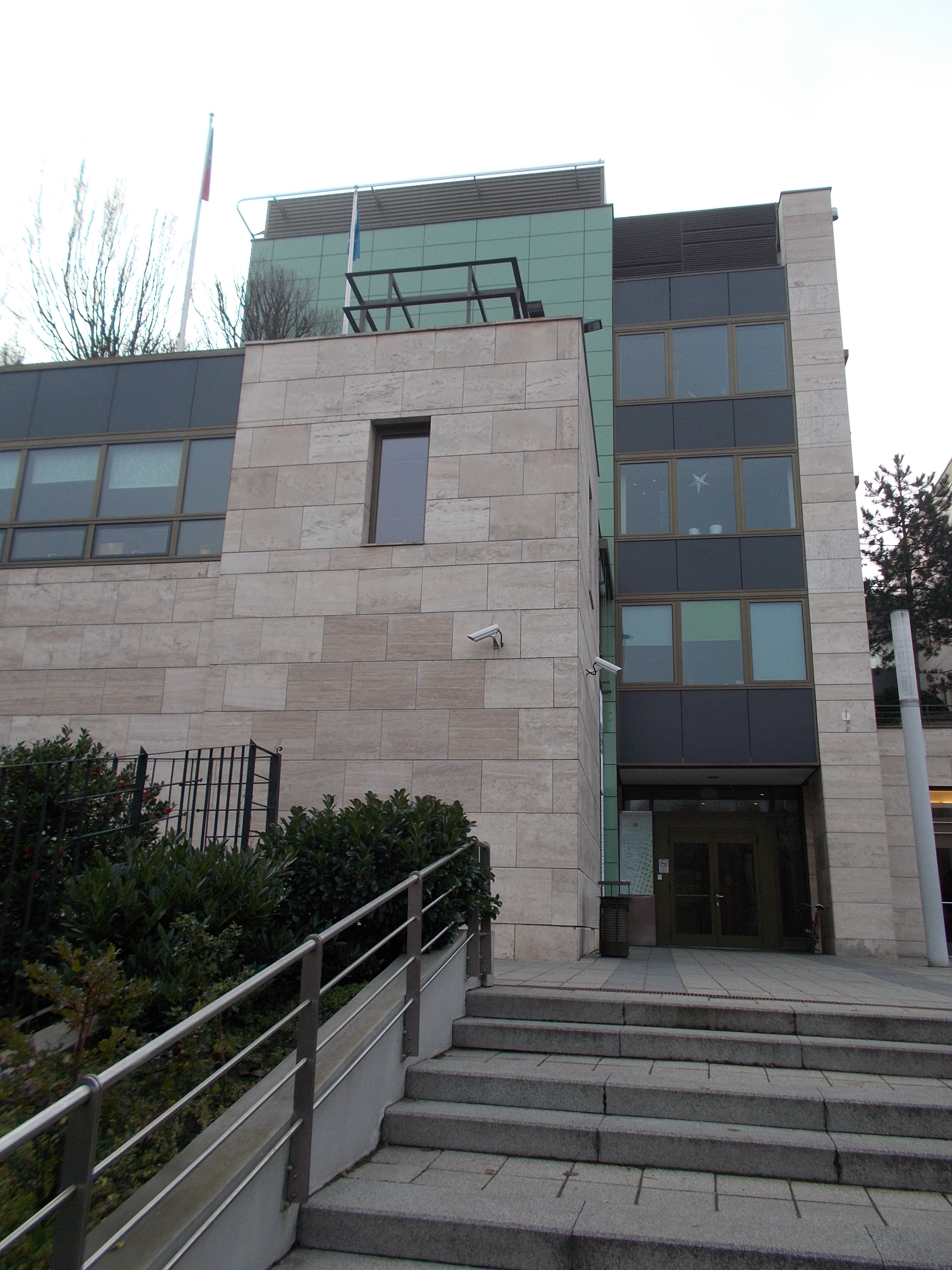
Embassy in Budapest

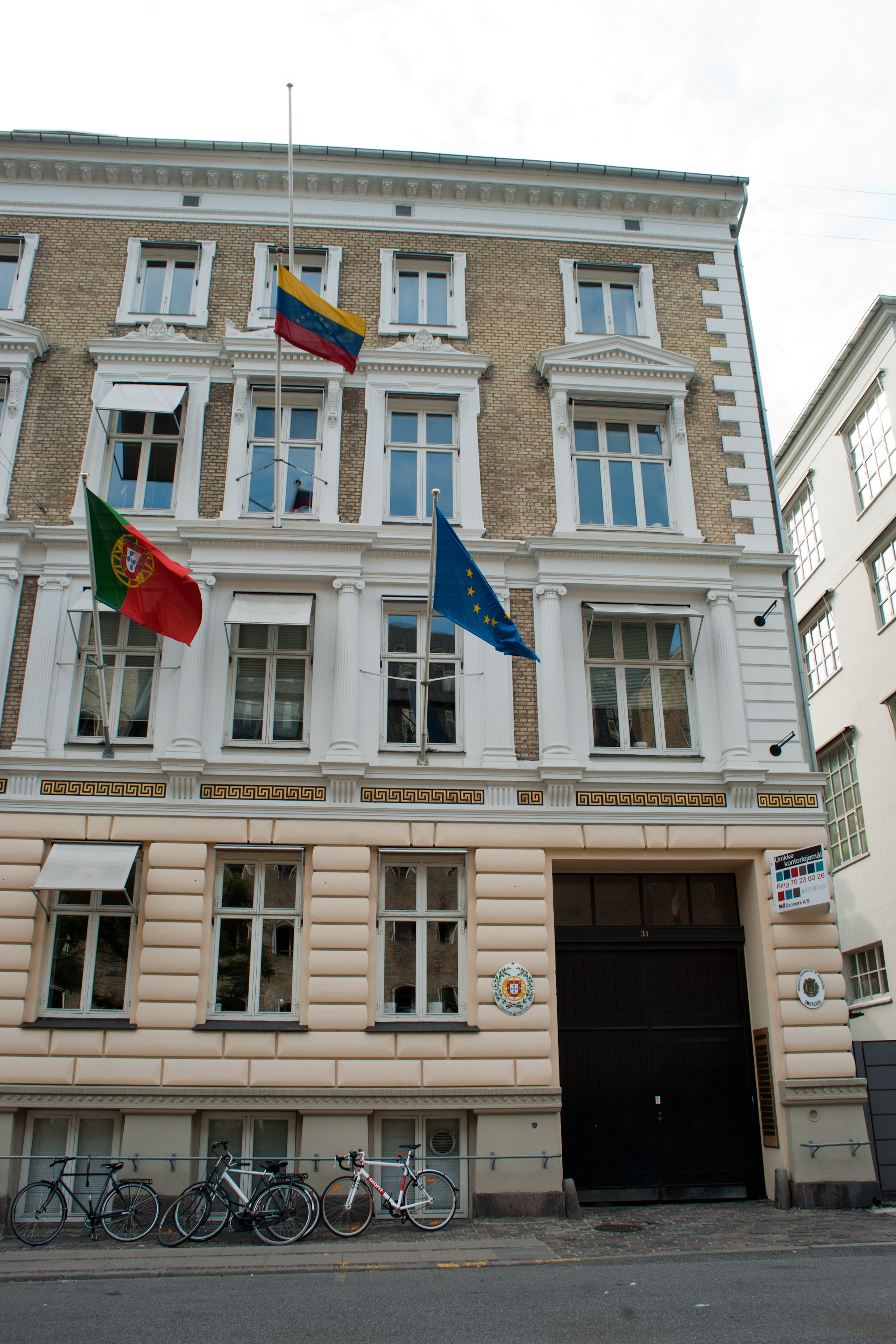
Embassy in Copenhagen

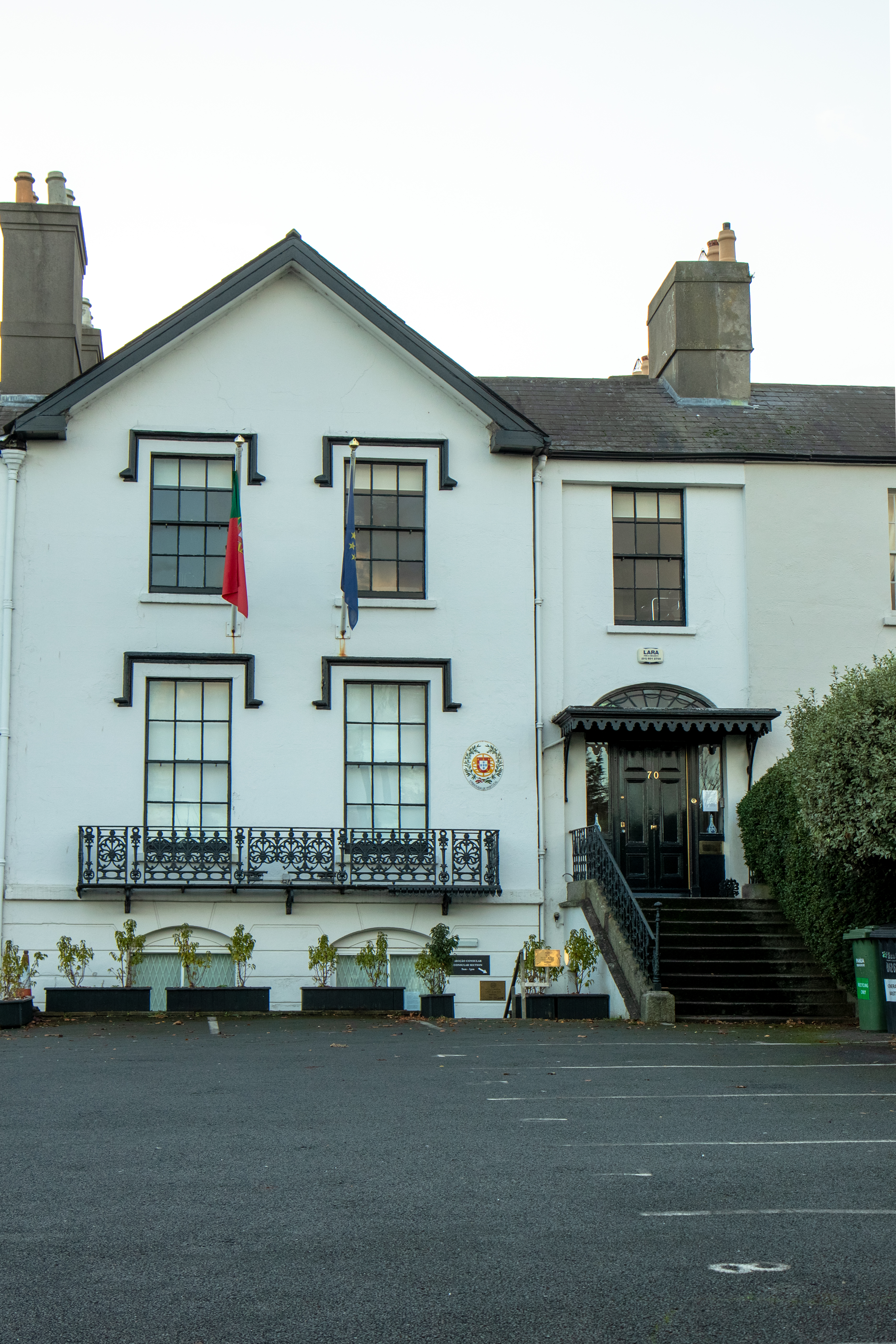
Embassy in Dublin

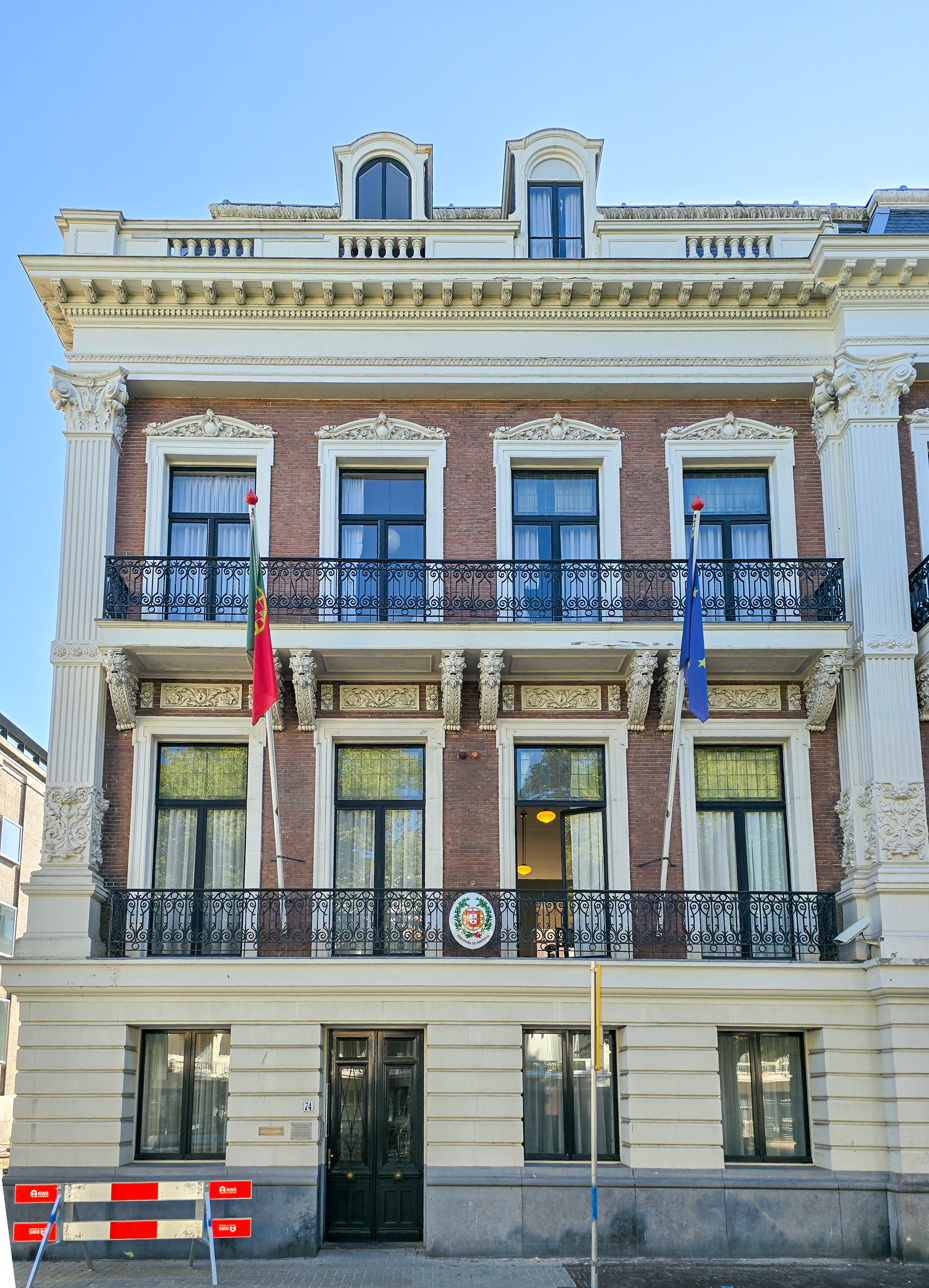
Embassy in The Hague

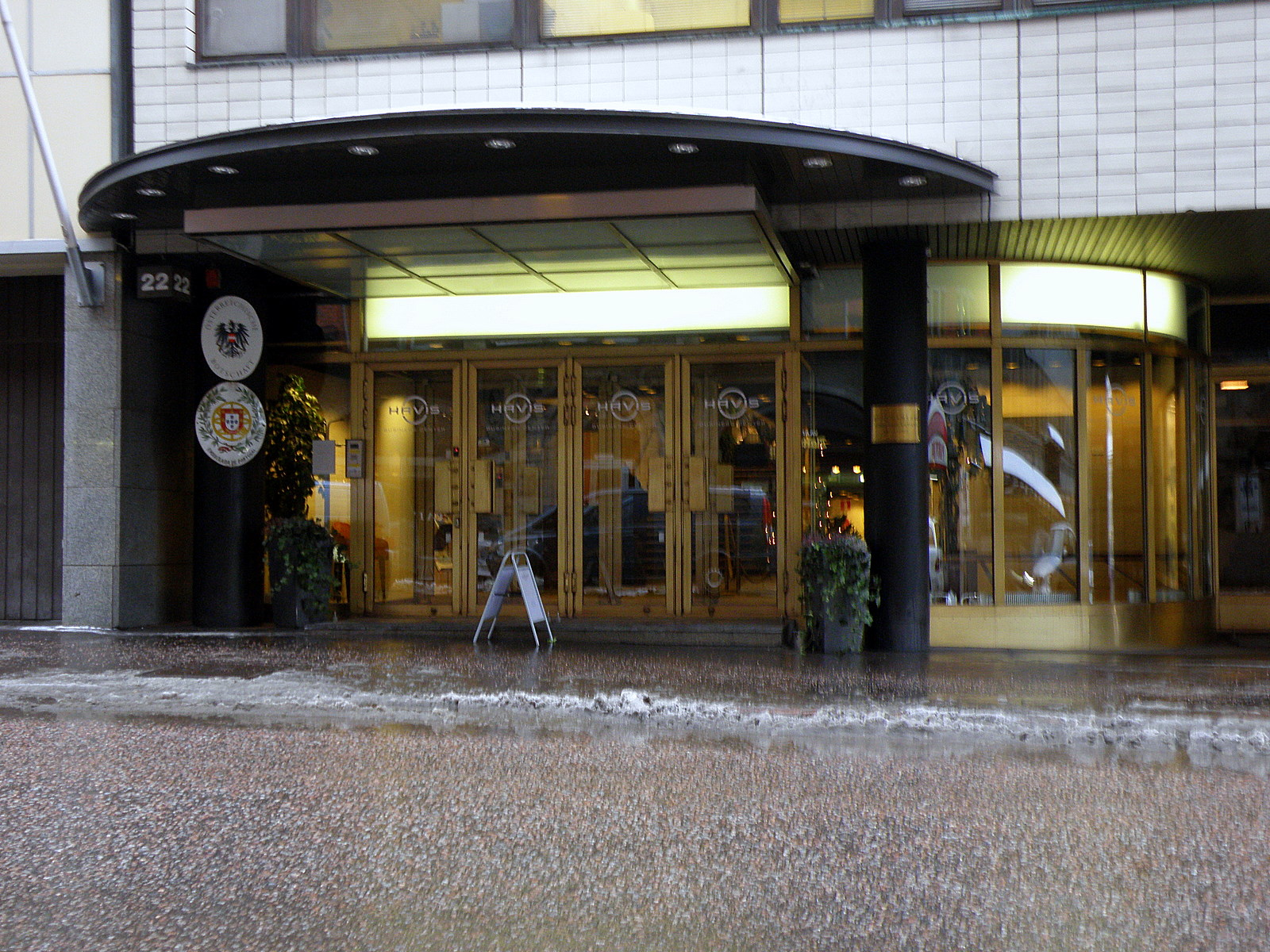
Embassy in Helsinki

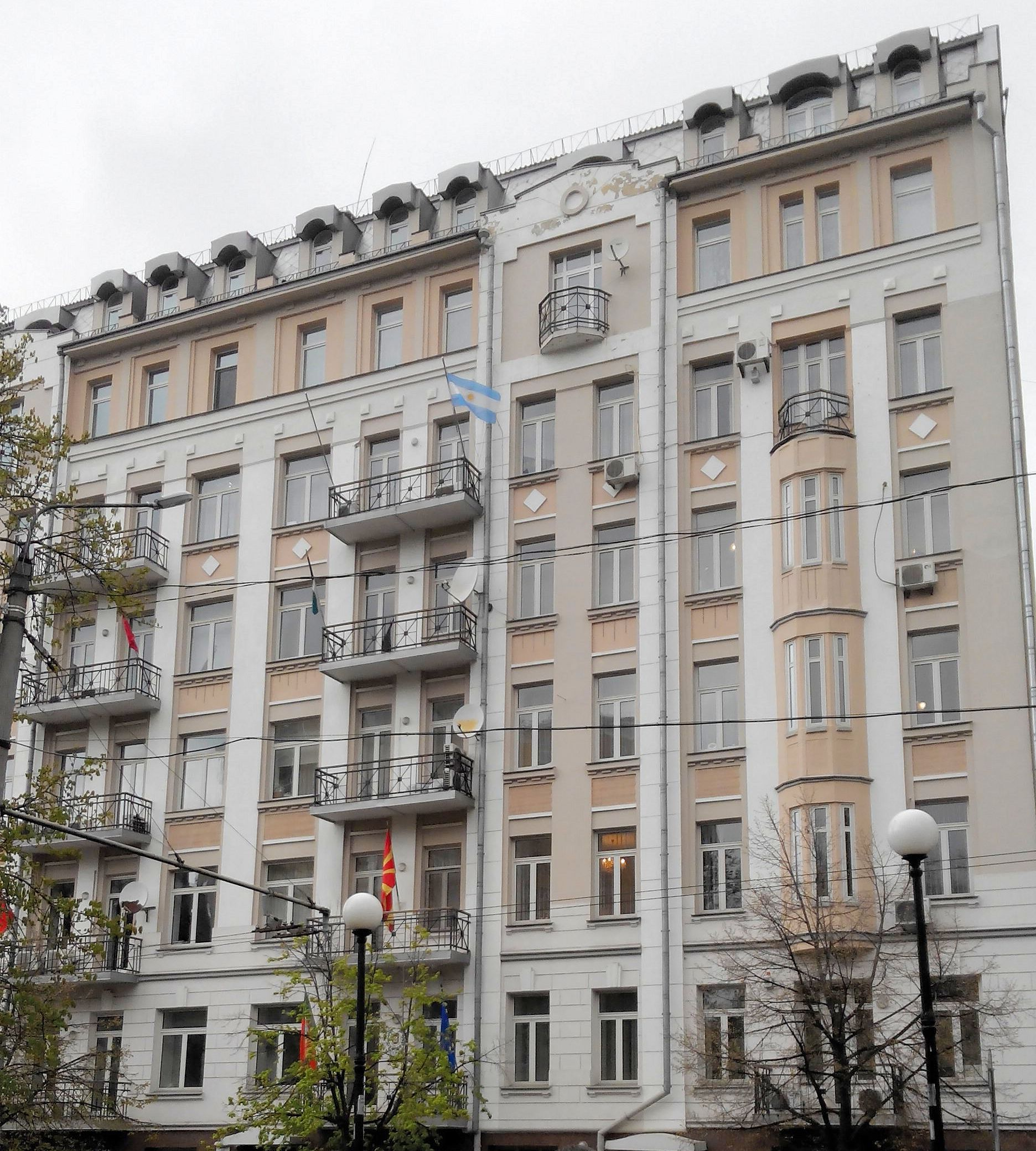
Building hosting the Embassy in Kyiv

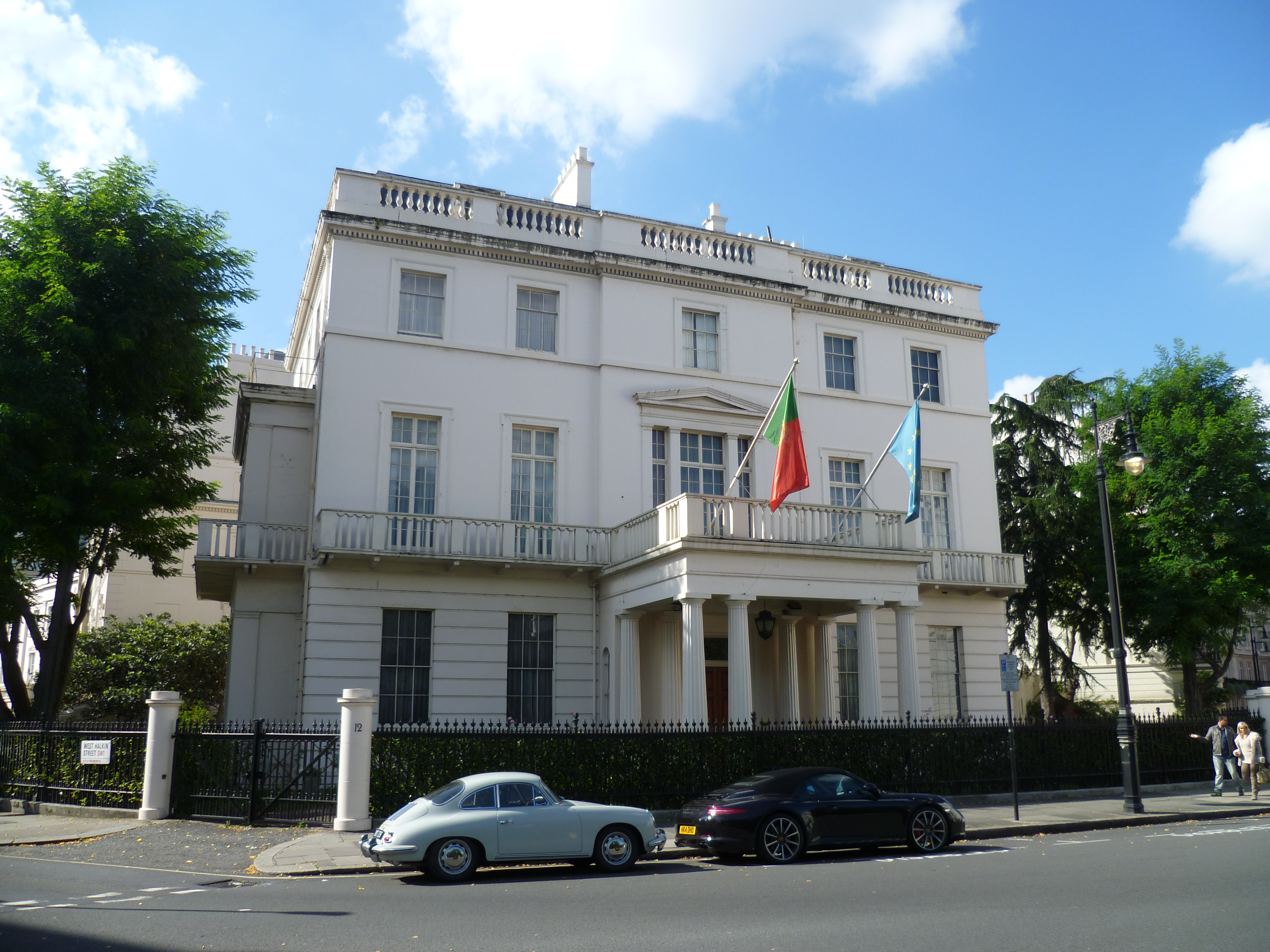
Embassy in London

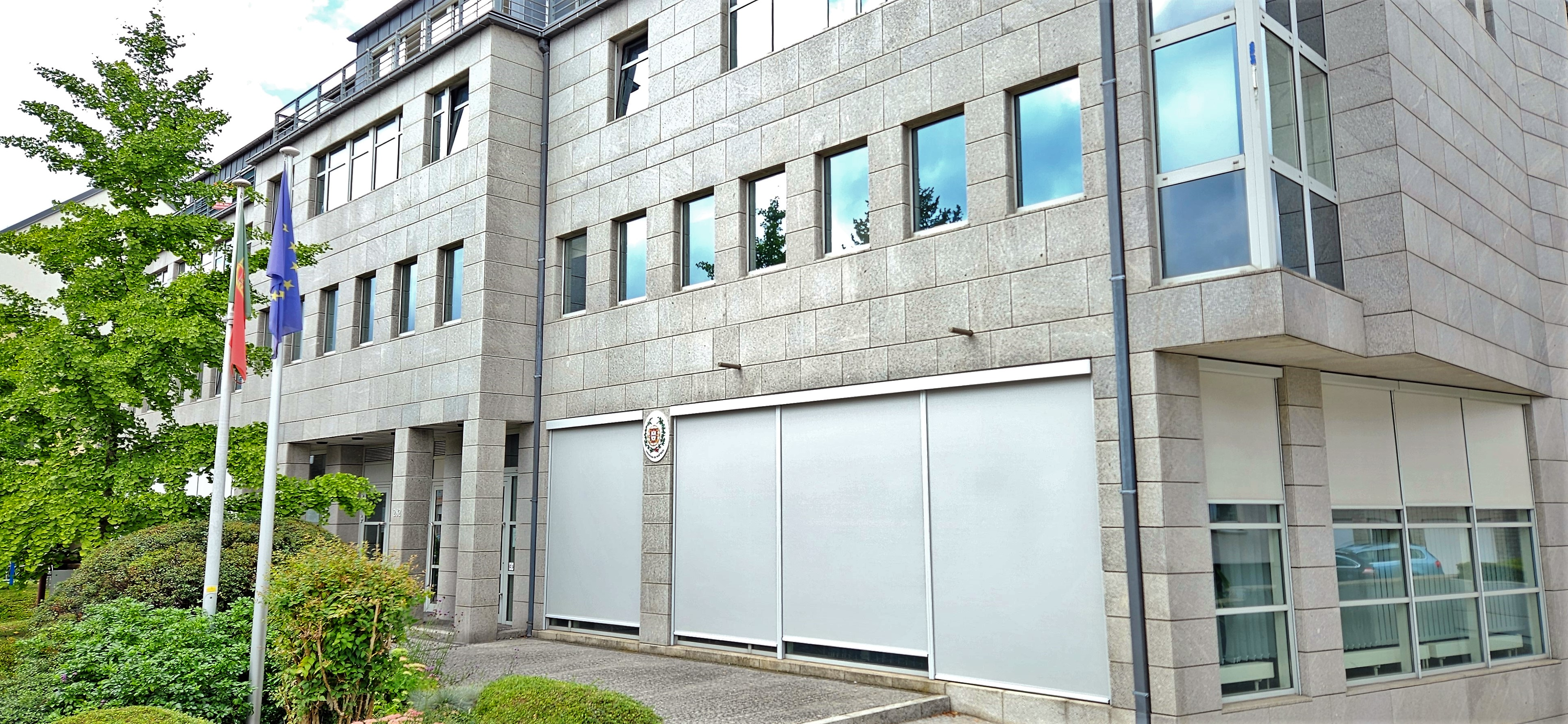
Embassy in Luxembourg City

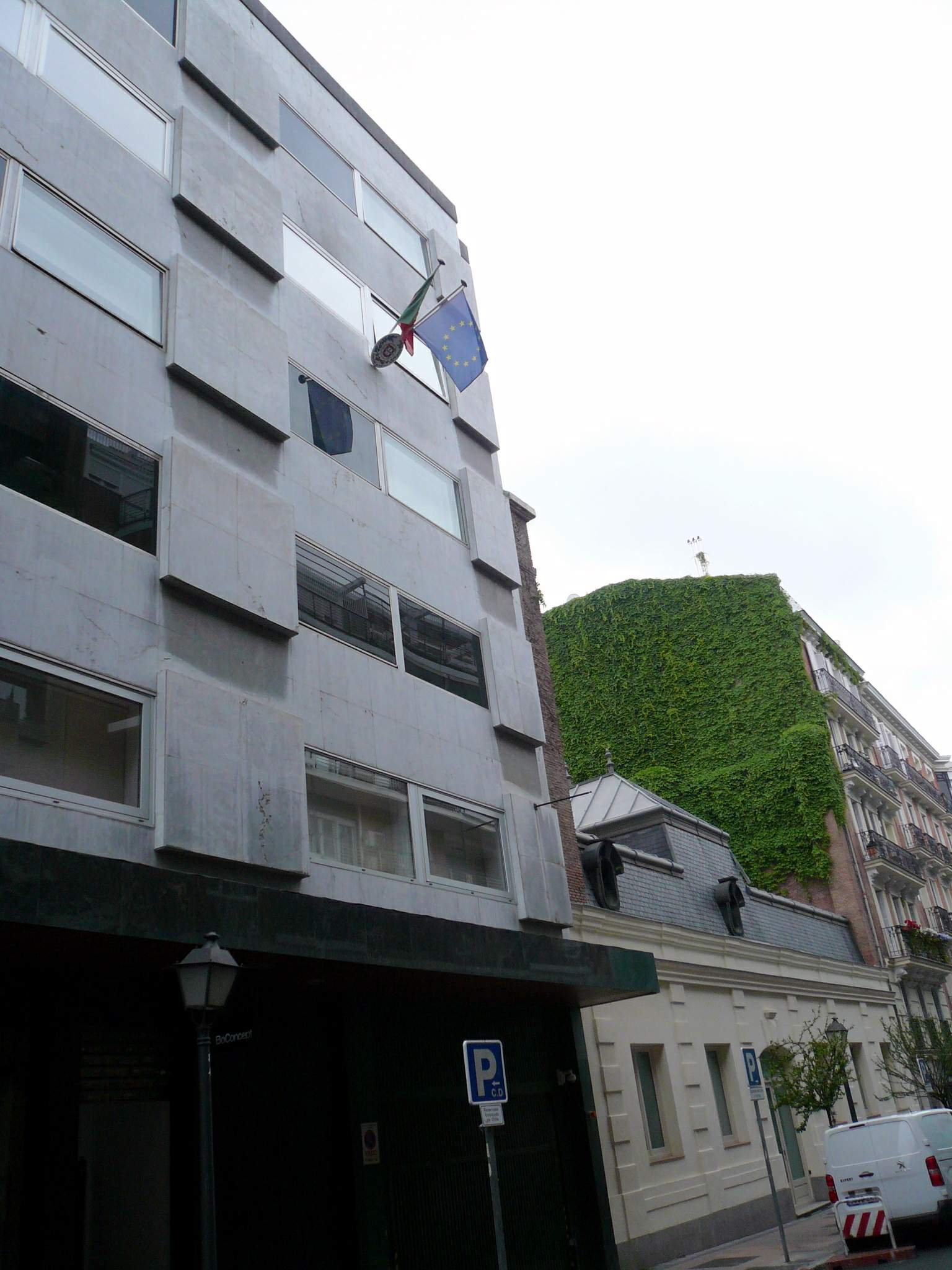
Embassy in Madrid

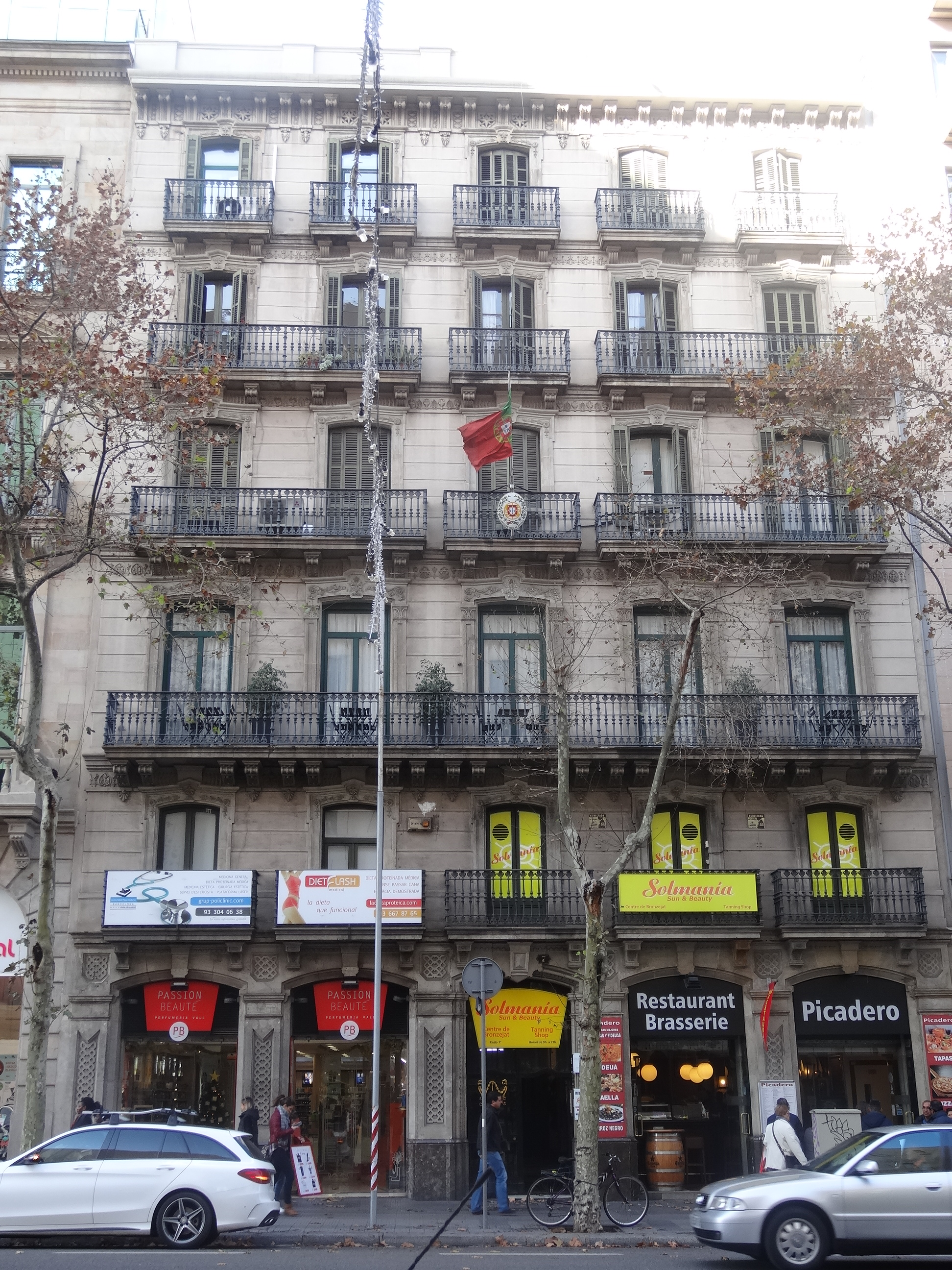
Consulate-General in Barcelona

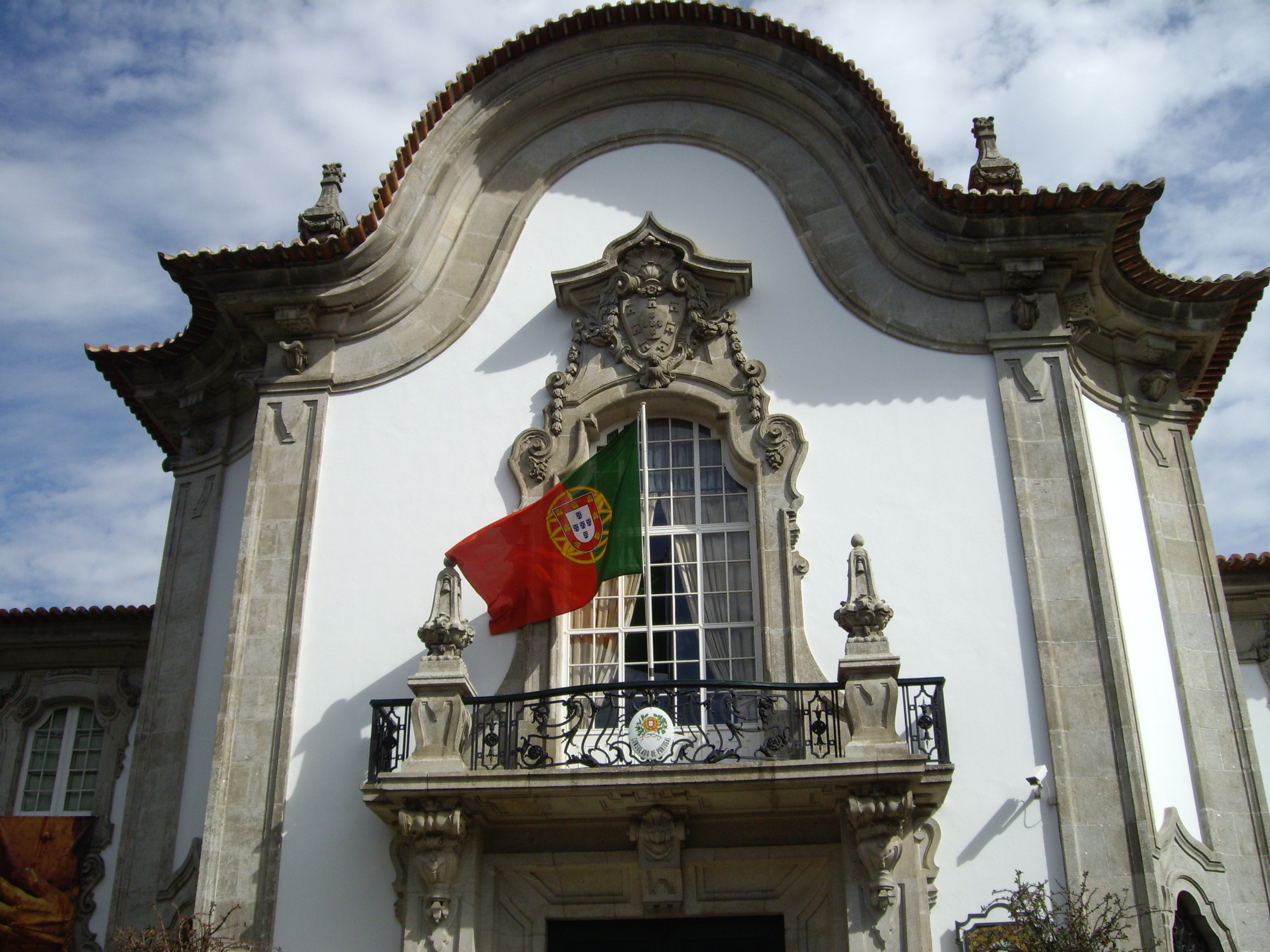
Consulate-General in Seville

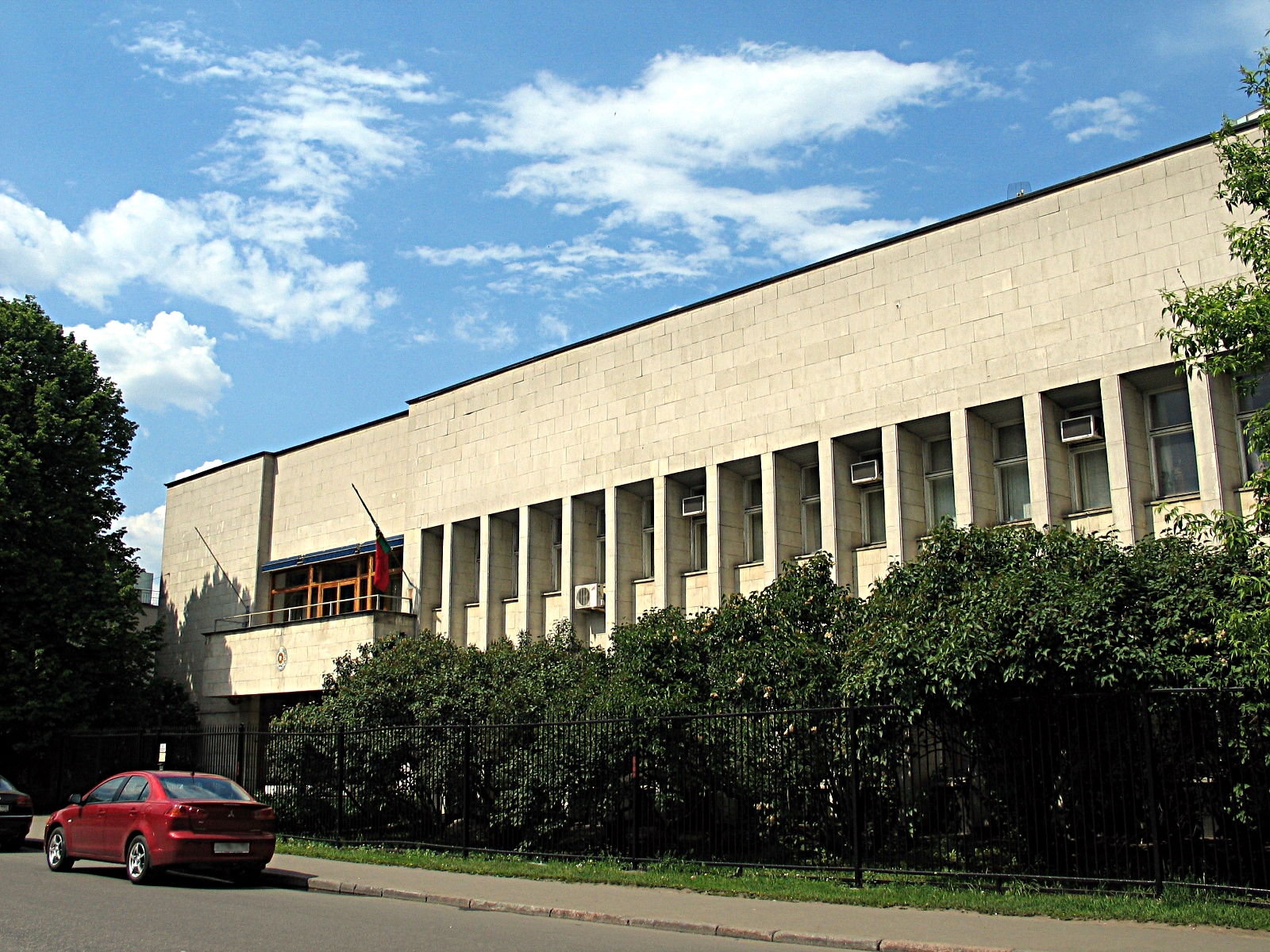
Embassy in Moscow

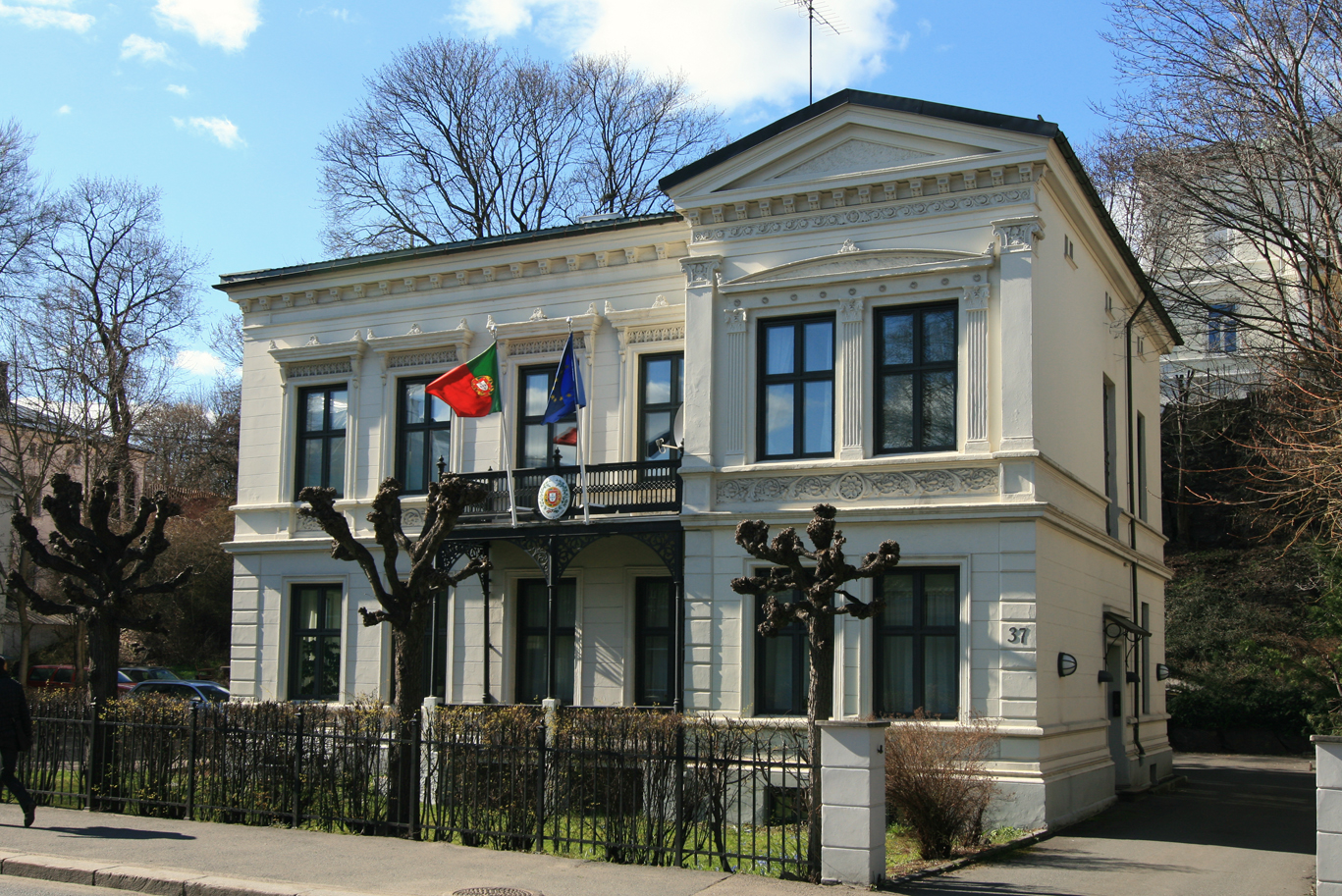
Embassy in Oslo

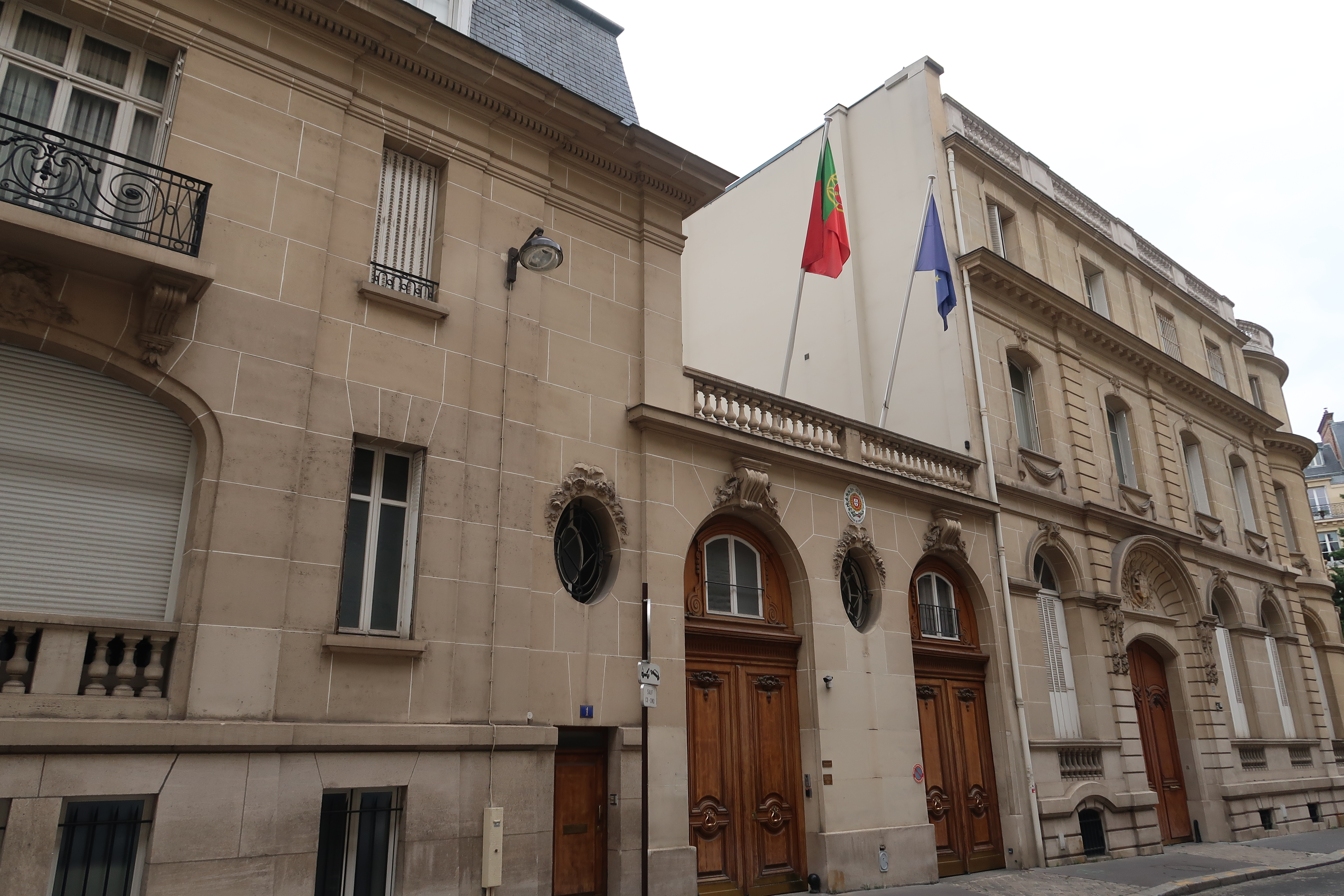
Embassy in Paris

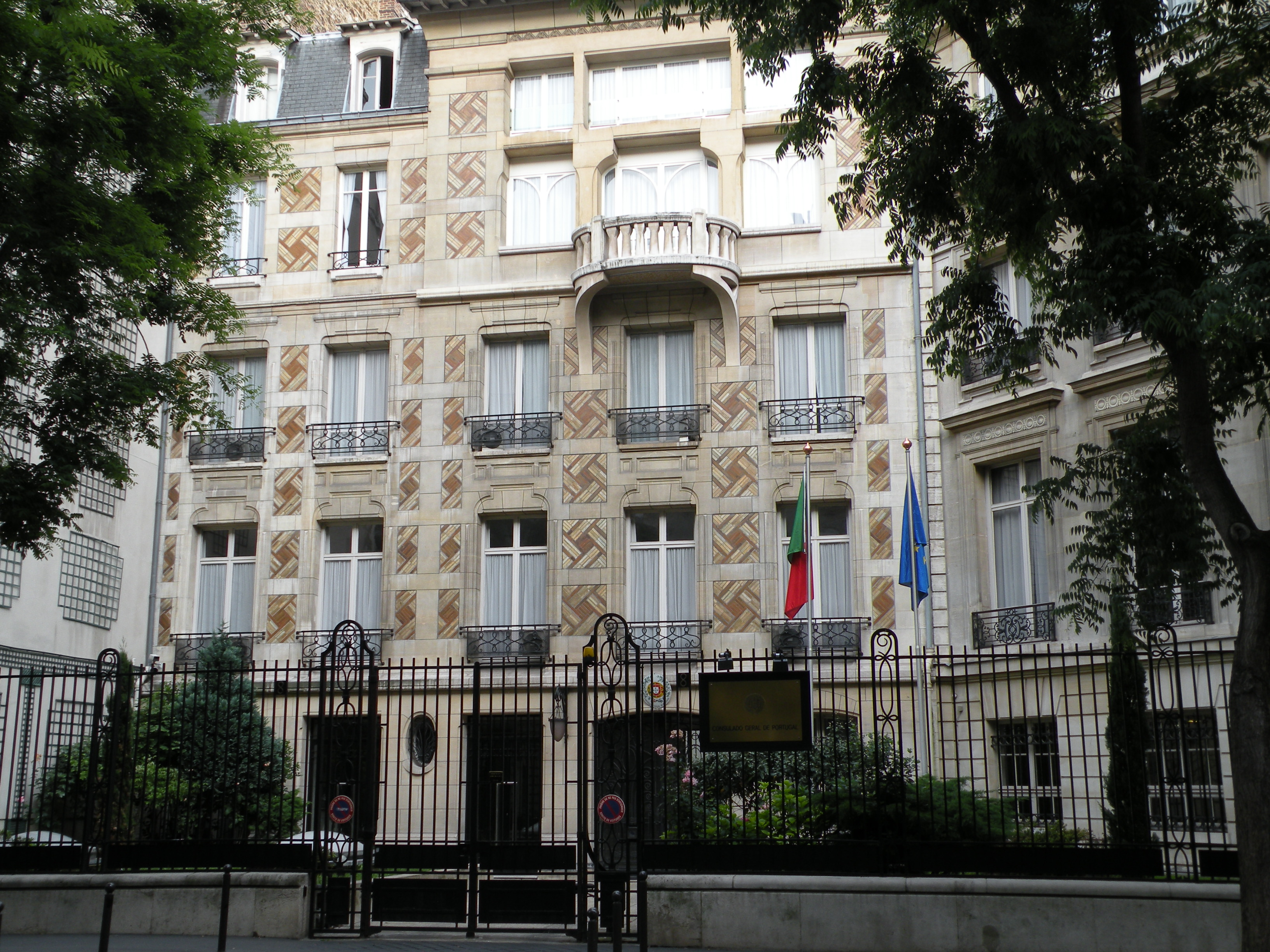
Consulate-General in Paris

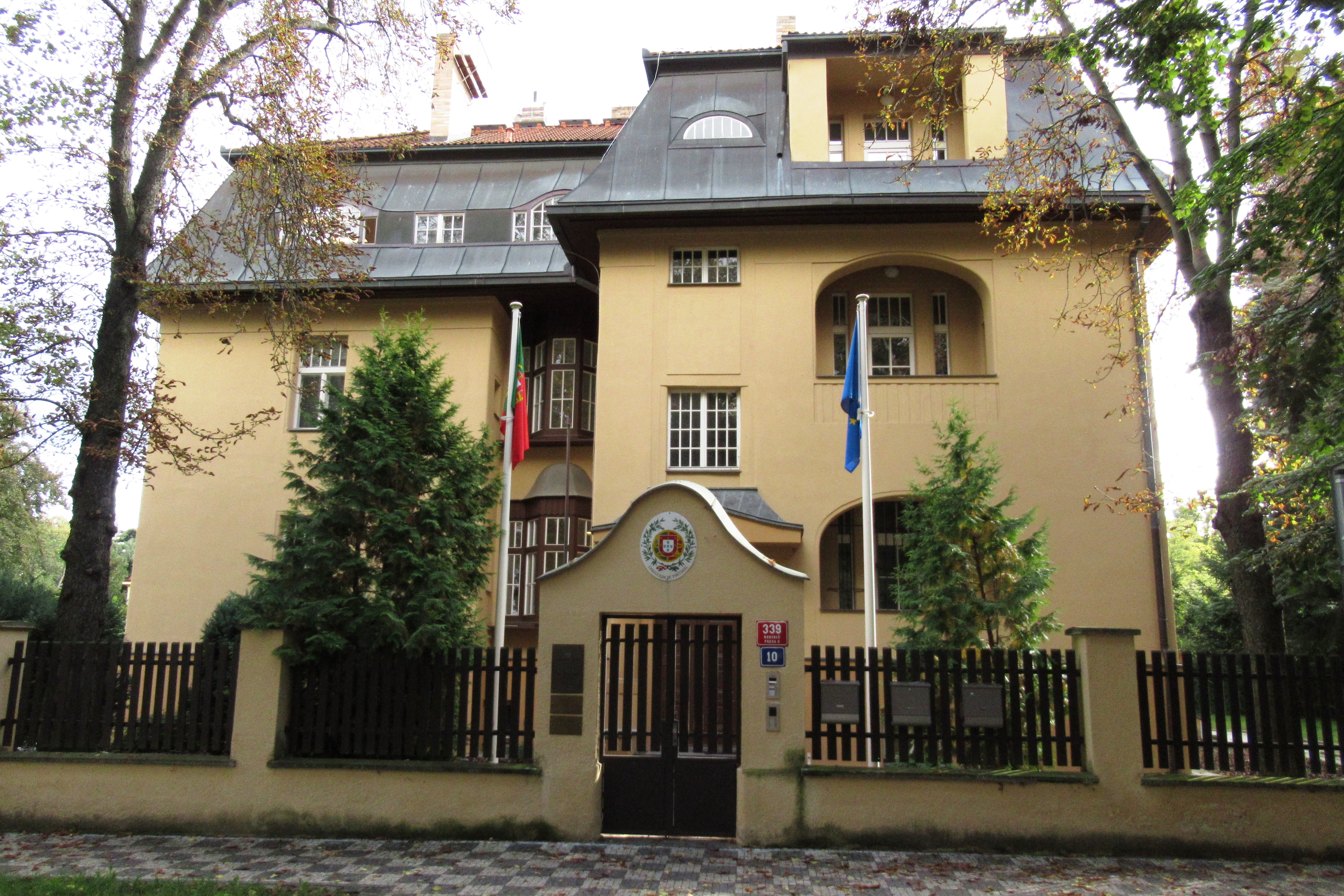
Embassy in Prague

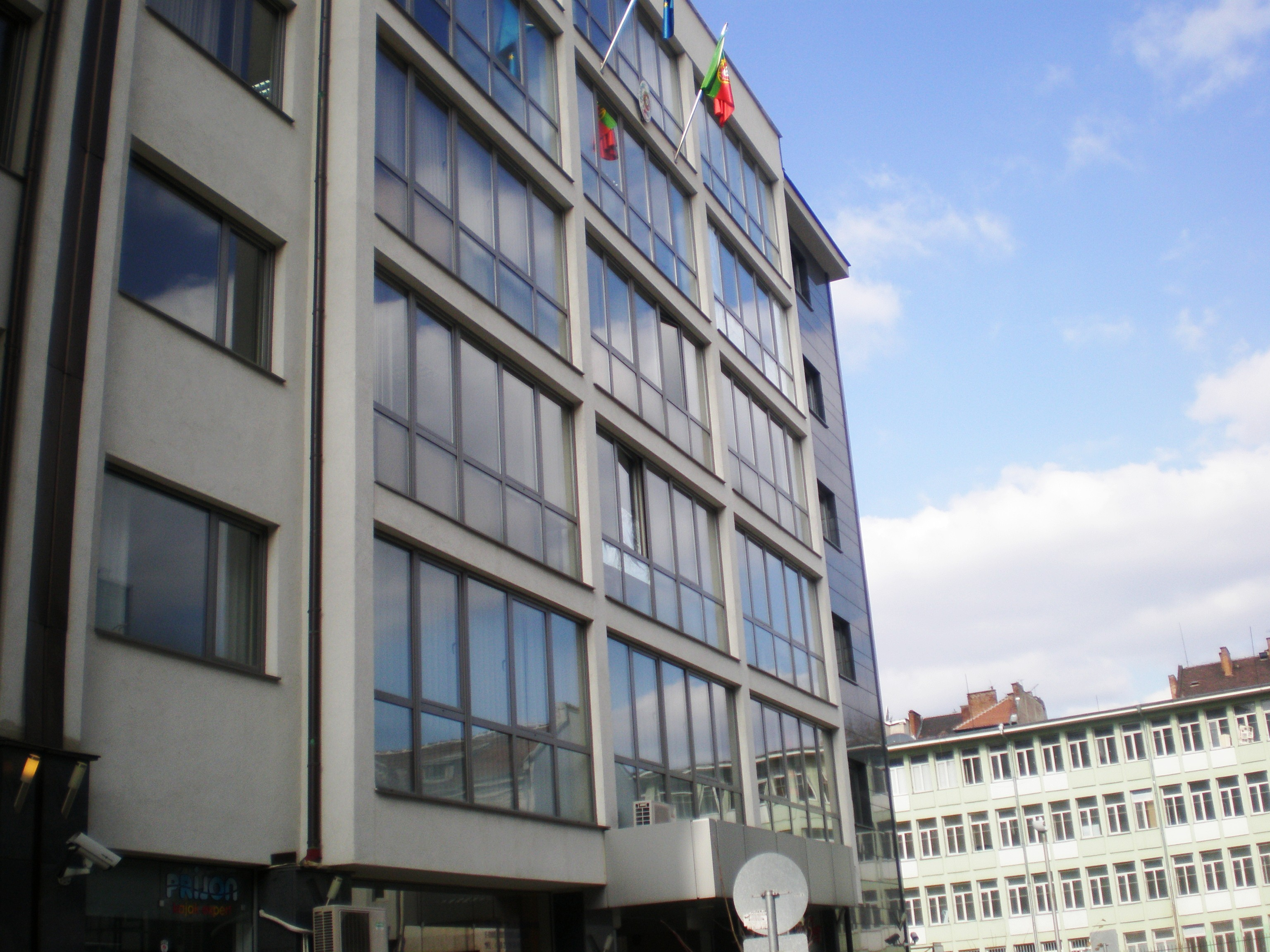
Embassy in Sofia

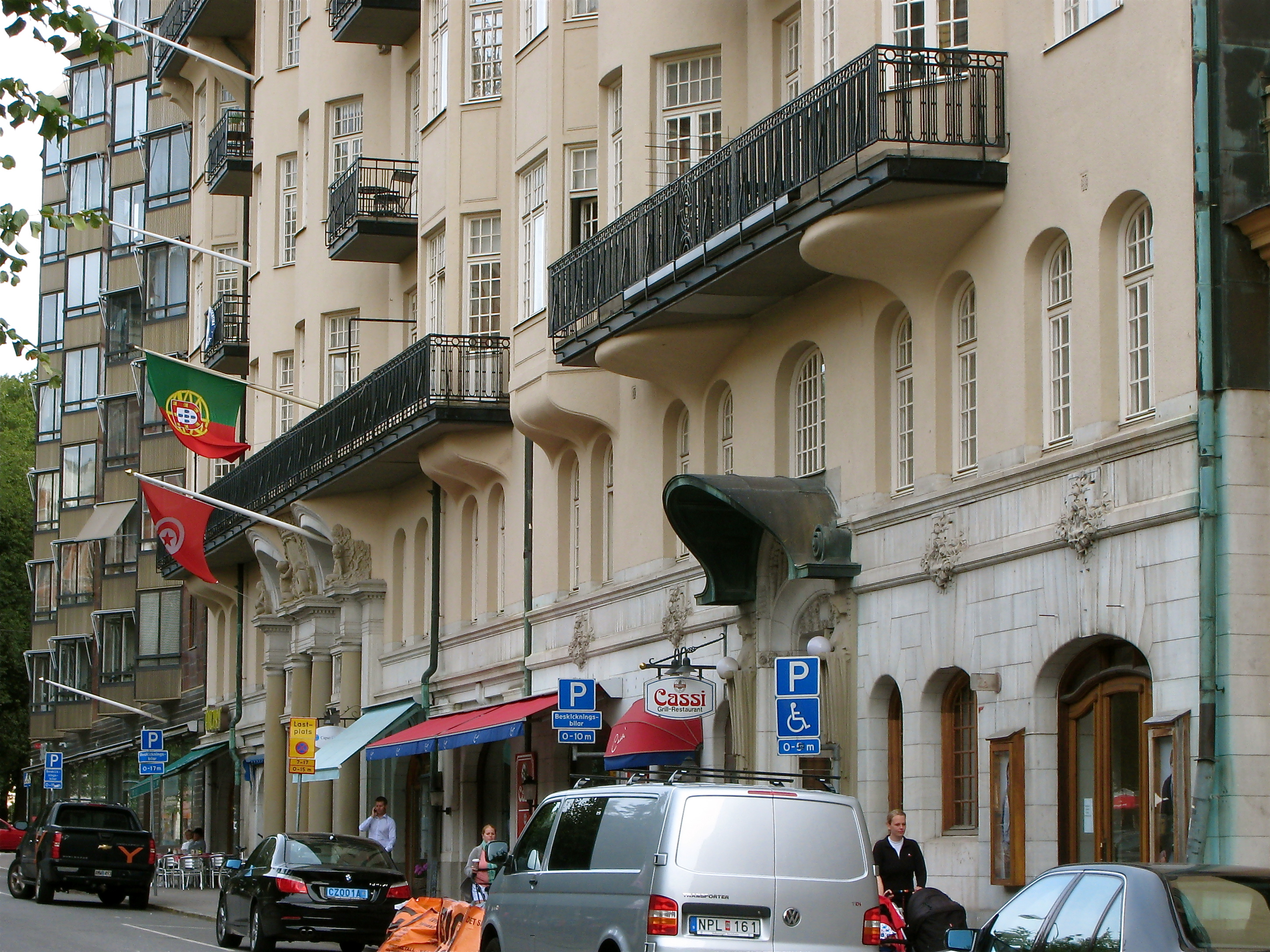
Embassy in Stockholm

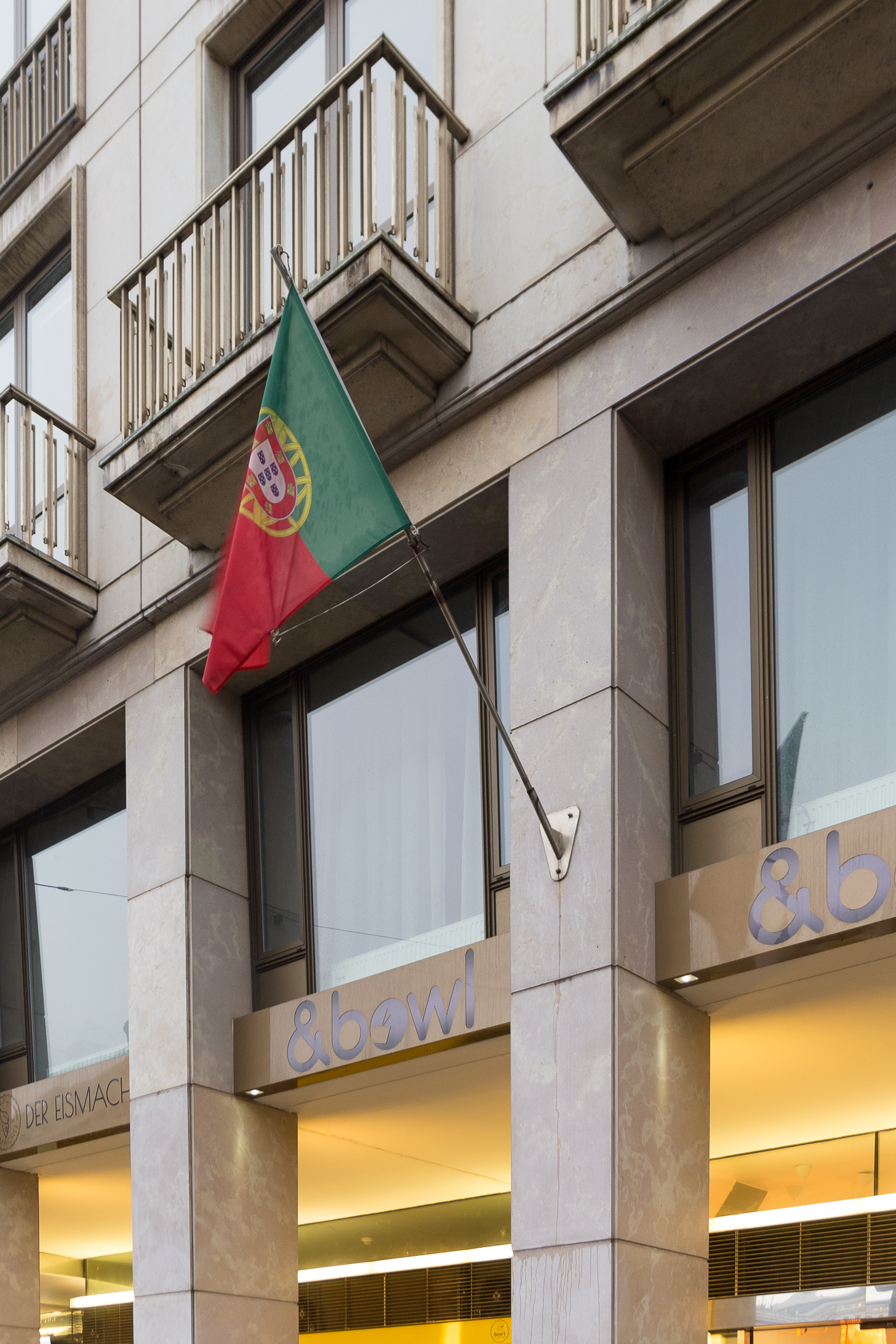
Embassy in Vienna

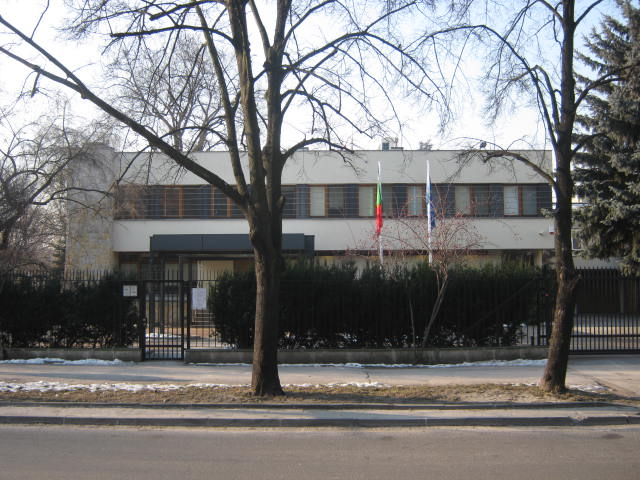
Embassy in Warsaw

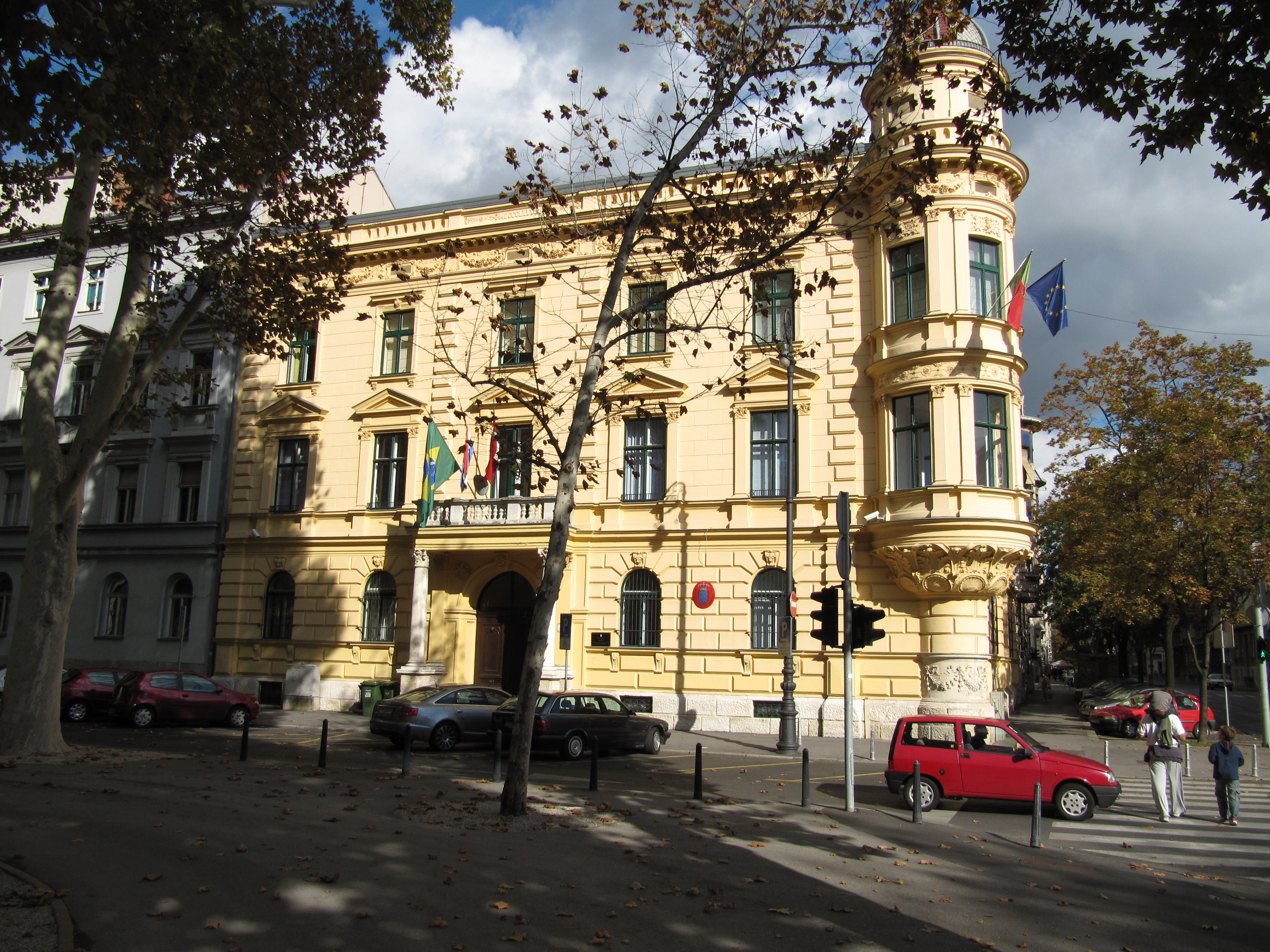
Building hosting the embassy in Zagreb

=== Oceania ===
Host country	Hoat city	Mission	Concurrent accreditation	Ref.
Australia	Canberra	Embassy	Countries: Cook Islands; Fiji; Kiribati; Micronesia; Nauru; New Zealand; Niue; Palau; Papua New Guinea; Samoa; Solomon Islands; Tonga; Tuvalu; Vanuatu	
Australia	Sydney	Consulate General	Countries: Cook Islands; Fiji; Kiribati; Micronesia; Nauru; New Zealand; Niue; Palau; Papua New Guinea; Samoa; Solomon Islands; Tonga; Tuvalu; Vanuatu	

=== Multilateral organisations ===
Organization	Host city	Host country	Mission	Concurrent accreditation	Ref.
Council of Europe	Strasbourg	France	Permanent Mission		
CPLP	Lisbon	Portugal	Permanent Mission		
European Union	Brussels	Belgium	Permanent Mission		
NATO	Brussels	Belgium	Permanent Mission		
OECD	Paris	France	Permanent Delegation		
OSCE	Vienna	Austria	Permanent Representation		
United Nations	New York City	United States	Permanent Mission		
United Nations	Geneva	Switzerland	Permanent Mission	International Organizations: World Trade Organization	
UNESCO	Paris	France	Permanent Delegation		

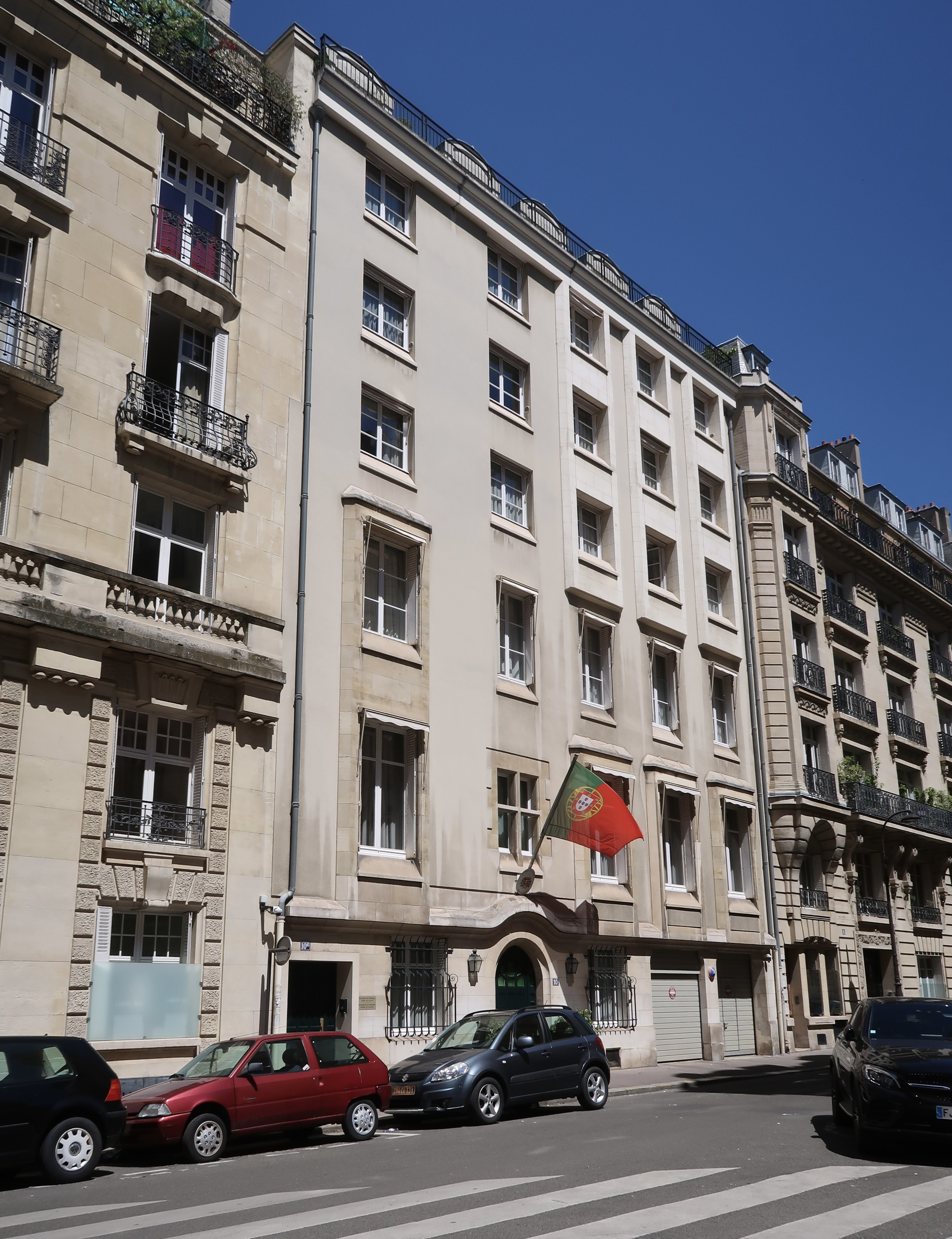
Permanent Mission to the OECD in Paris

== Closed missions ==
=== Africa ===
Host country	Host city	Mission	Year closed	Ref.
Libya	Tripoli	Embassy (Note: To be reopened)	2014	
Swaziland (Note: The embassy closed down prior to the renaming of the Kingdom of Swaziland into the Kingdom of Eswatini in 2018.)	Mbabane	Embassy	Unknown	
Zambia	Lusaka	Embassy	Unknown	

=== Asia ===
Host country	Host city	Mission	Year closed	Ref.
China	Hong Kong	Consulate General	2003	
Iraq	Baghdad	Embassy	Unknown	
Philippines	Manila	Embassy (Note: To be reopened in 2027.)	2011	

=== Europe ===
Host country	Host city	Mission	Year closed	Ref.
Andorra	Andorra la Vella	Embassy (Note: Resident in Madrid, Spain)	2012	
Bosnia and Herzegovina	Sarajevo	Embassy (Note: Resident in Budapest, Hungary)	2012	
Estonia	Tallinn	Embassy (Note: Resident in Helsinki, Finland)	2012	
France	Ajaccio	Consular office	2013	
France	Clermont-Ferrand	Vice-consulate	2012	
France	Lille	Consular office	2012	
France	Nancy	Consulate	2005	
France	Nantes	Vice-consulate	2012	
France	Nogent-sur-Marne	Consulate	2008	
France	Orléans	Consulate	2008	
France	Tours	Consulate	2008	
France	Versailles	Consulate	2008	
Germany	Osnabrück	Vice-consulate	2012	
Germany	Frankfurt	Vice-consulate	2012	
Latvia	Riga	Embassy	2012	
Lithuania	Vilnius	Embassy	2012	
Malta	Valletta	Embassy	2012	
Slovenia	Ljubljana	Embassy	2013	
Spain	Bilbao	Consulate	2007	

== See also ==
- Foreign relations of Portugal
- List of diplomatic missions in Portugal
- Visa policy of the Schengen Area
