= Tasis =

Tasis may refer to:

== People ==
- Tasis (rapper), Finnish rapper
- Tasis Petridis (born 1966), Australian kickboxer and boxer

== Other ==
- TASiS, a version of the disk operating system iS-DOS
- TASIS Schools, a Swiss foundation which operates a group of four international schools:
  - TASIS Dorado, in Puerto Rico
  - TASIS England, in Thorpe
  - TASIS Portugal, in Linhó
  - TASIS Switzerland, in Montagnola
- Sudan Founding Alliance, political alliance and organization led by the Rapid Support Forces
