= TASIS England =

International school in Thorpe, England

Location
- Thorpe, Runnymede, Surrey, TW20 8TE; England; 51.408°N 0.526°W

Information
- School type: American international school (Day & boarding school)
- Founded: 1976
- Sister school: TASIS Schools
- CEEB code: 724736
- Headmaster: Bryan Nixon
- Grades: Pre-K — 12
- Enrollment: 646
- Colours: Blue and red
- Mascot: TASIS Lion
- Affiliations: CIS; NEASC
- Website: www.tasisengland.org

TASIS England, formally known as TASIS The American School in England, is an American international boarding and day school in England. Founded in 1976, it is the second-oldest of the TASIS Schools, a Swiss group of American international boarding schools.

Located in Thorpe, Runnymede, in the County of Surrey, the school enrolls approximately 650 pupils from around the world.

== History ==
TASIS stands for The American School in Switzerland. TASIS England was originally set up as a branch of that school based in Surrey, England. Its relationship to the Swiss base of TASIS (other than common ownership) is that of a sister school. TASIS England was founded in 1976 by Mary Crist Fleming by way of expansion. TASIS England is the second-oldest of five American schools in England.

== Academics ==
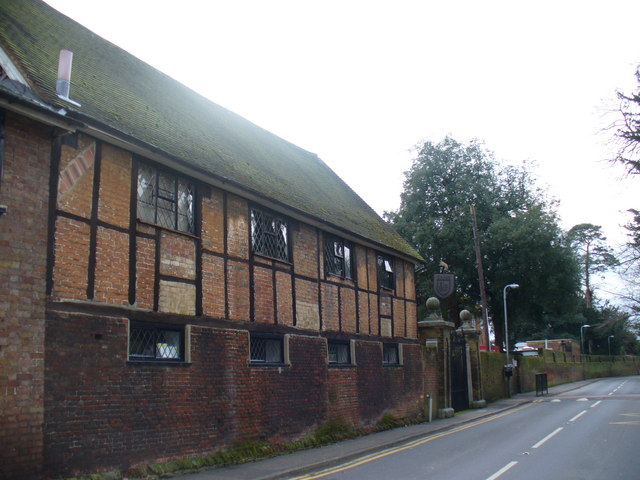
Stables at TASIS England.

TASIS England's faculty staff-to-student ratio is 1:5. The Upper School is college preparatory and currently operates on a block schedule.

The Lower and Middle Schools teach the American Core Knowledge curriculum. The Upper School since 2005-2006 offers the International Baccalaureate together with the traditional American AP system. They offer a total of 24 AP courses.

TASIS offers is an Academic Travel Program. During October break, Upper School students travel, if they wish, to various countries throughout the world. International trips are also offered to Middle School students in the spring.

=== Arts ===
The Fleming Theatre offers rehearsal and performance spaces. The Fleming Gallery has rotating displays that showcase student work. The Visual Arts is centered around the Fine Arts Center, with purpose-built Photography, Drawing & Painting, Ceramics, Sculpture and Printmaking spaces.

=== Athletics ===
TASIS England offers competitive soccer, volleyball, cross country, basketball, rugby, cheerleading, tennis and lacrosse at the varsity and junior varsity levels. Students travel throughout England and Europe for tournaments. TASIS is a member of the International Schools Athletic Association (ISAA). At the end of each season, varsity teams travel internationally to play in the ISAA tournaments.

== Campus ==
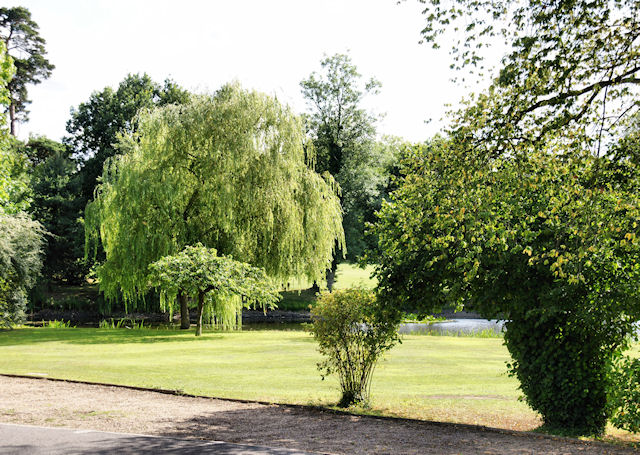
Part of the school grounds.

The 46-acre school campus is in two halves. The North site, separated by a public lane, has modern buildings set behind its largely administrative 17th century rebuilding of Thorpe manor house (with Georgian front elevation). The South site centers on the grand early 19th-century convent built in the grounds of Thorpe manor house, built in yellow brick featuring a two-storey splay sided bay with sash windows in splays and French windows. James Lander wrote an extensive history of the school and surrounding area in The Heart of Thorpe.

The school is divided into North and South Campuses, separated by Coldharbour Lane. The Lower and Middle Schools form the North campus. Several dormatories, Thorpe House, Upper School cafeteria and Student Center are on the South campus.

Buildings were designed by architect and artist David Mayernik, who previously won the Palladio award from the Traditional Building Conference for his design at TASIS Switzerland, and who also designed the campus of TASIS Portugal.

== Administration ==
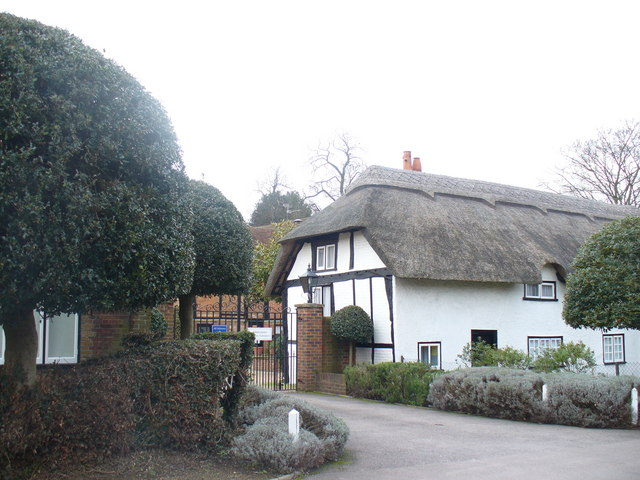
The "Old Cottage".

The Council of International Schools (CIS), the New England Association of Schools and Colleges (NEASC), and the International Baccalaureate Organisation have all accredited TASIS England.

The school is inspected by the Independent Schools' Inspectorate. In May 2019, ISI visited TASIS England to carry out a Regulatory Compliance Inspection. The resultant report confirmed that the school is fully compliant in all respects with the rigorous regulations and standards set by the Department for Education.

Previously, the school was inspected by Ofsted, the Office for Standards in Education of the UK government. An Ofsted inspection carried out in May 2016, rated the school as "inadequate" in eight of ten categories assessed. While a follow-up Ofsted inspection carried out in December 2016 found some improvements, the school still did not meet all of the independent school standards and national minimum standards for residential provision that were checked during this inspection. A further Ofsted inspection in September 2017 found that the school had improved and was meeting all of the independent school standards and national minimum standards for residential provision.

CIS and NEASC inspected TASIS England in March 2016, and their report lists areas needing improvement, while also calling the school "a forward-thinking school, developing new programs to meet the demands of a 21st century education and … [the School] benefits from strong and collaborative leadership."

== Notable alumni ==
- Madeleine Altmann - video artist
- Emma Caulfield - actor
- Emmy Clarke - singer, songwriter and film director
- Jon Finkel - Magic: The Gathering world champion
- Francesca Gregorini - actor
- Philip Hanson - racing driver
- Tyler Hinman - crossword solver and constructor
- Marc Hyman - screenwriter
- Olga Koch - comedian, writer and actor
- Camilla Luddington - actor, Grey's Anatomy

== See also ==
- TASIS Schools
- TASIS Switzerland
- TASIS Portugal
- TASIS Dorado
