= Linhó Detention Center =

Portuguese detention center in Alcabideche, Cascais

Coordinates: 38.7531°N 9.3842°W

Linhó Detention Center (Estabelecimento Prisional do Linhó) is a Portuguese detention center in Alcabideche, Cascais, that serves the Lisbon Metropolitan Area. It has about 500 inmates.

== History ==
The Lisbon Central Prison (Cadeia Central de Lisboa) was created in 1954 in the civil parish of Alcabideche, in Cascais Municipality, just outside of Linhó, Sintra Municipality, from which it borrowed its name, and became a major prison of Lisbon Metropolitan Area. With 90 ha, it was founded in a conterminous area of the two municipalities in 1954 and is now called Estabelecimento Prisional do Linhó (Linhó Detention Center) after Linhó, Sintra. It houses young adult convicts. The prison accommodation area consists of two main wings with three floors and two secondary wings attached to them. It also has an intramural security section and three pavilions for the open regime located outside the prison walls, the latter built in 1994. The establishment has a health unit, built in 1998 for the prison population of the detention center and other detention centers in the southern region of the country. As far as the sports area is concerned, the inmates have three gyms and three multi-purpose pitches. It also has several workshops and a livestock farm, where a large number of inmates have the chance to spend some of their time, creating and cementing work habits. Taking into account the prison population for which it is essentially intended, the Linhó Detention Center has favoured the areas of education and teaching, vocational training, occupational work and sport. The prison population is mainly made up of convicted prisoners aged between 21 and 30.
