= Igreja da Penha Longa =

Church in Linhó, Portugal

Coordinates: 38.762718°N 9.397849°W

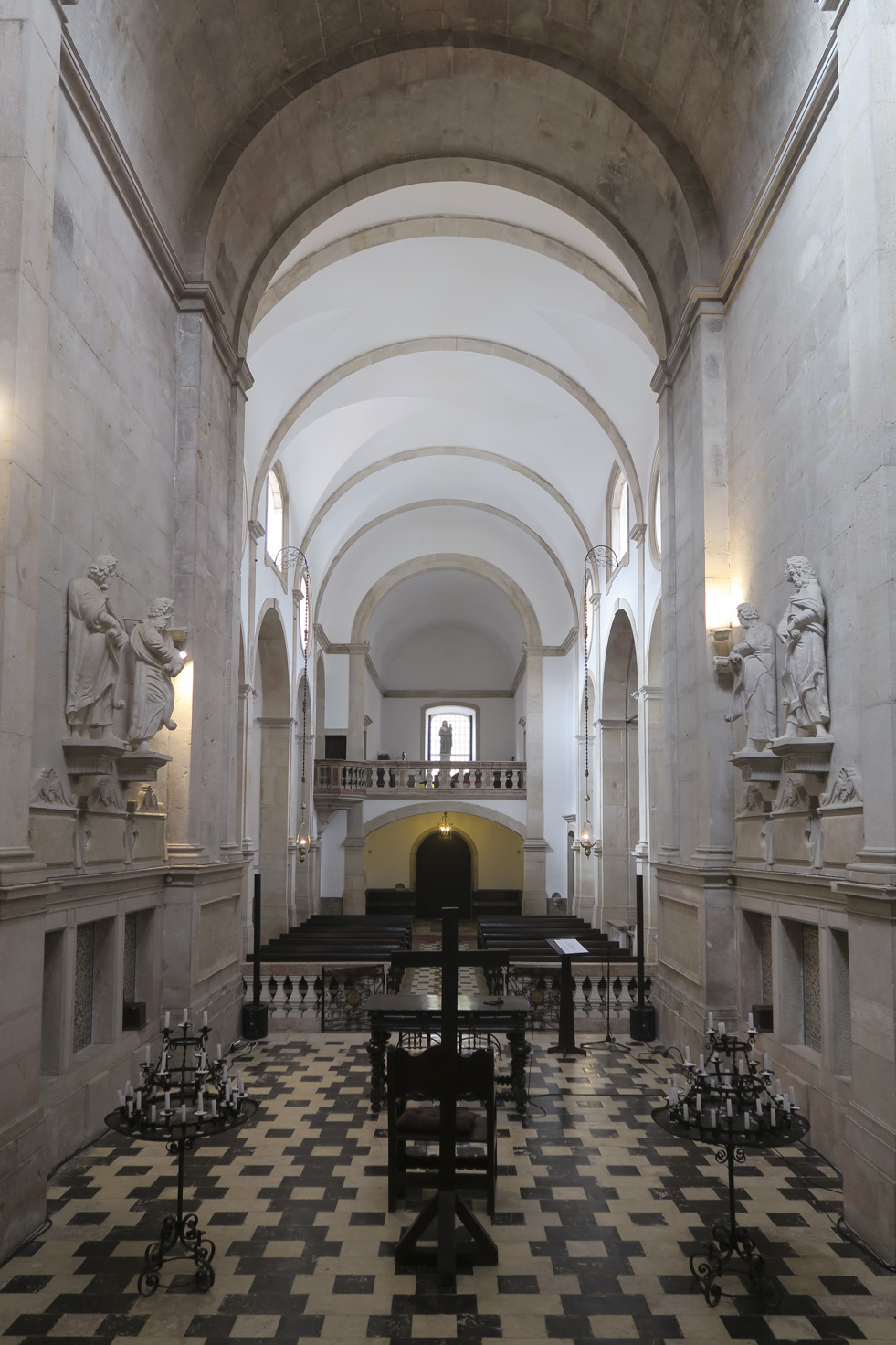
Cardinal-King Henry I of Portugal built the interior of the church at Penha Longa.

Igreja da Penha Longa is a church in Linhó, Sintra, Portugal. It is classified as a National Monument.

== See also ==
- pt:Igreja da Penha Longa on Portuguese Wikipedia.
