= Take Me Home Huey =

American art project

Take Me Home Huey is an art project and sculpture that was manifested from a discarded U.S. Army Bell UH-1 Iroquois helicopter, that served as an air ambulance for the U.S. Army in the Vietnam War. The serial number is 67-17174, commonly known as #174. Artist Steve Maloney created the concept and artwork using the restored helicopter's 47-foot long fuselage as a canvas. The composition includes a mule pack of soldier's duffels, public address speakers and a vinyl wrap of Vietnam Helicopter Squadron names, along with symbolic 1960's and 70's pop culture imagery of icons that many soldiers longed for. The cockpit contains a time capsule of original veteran's artifacts, along with the abstract suspension of miscellaneous helicopter parts and instruments that were part of the original aircraft.

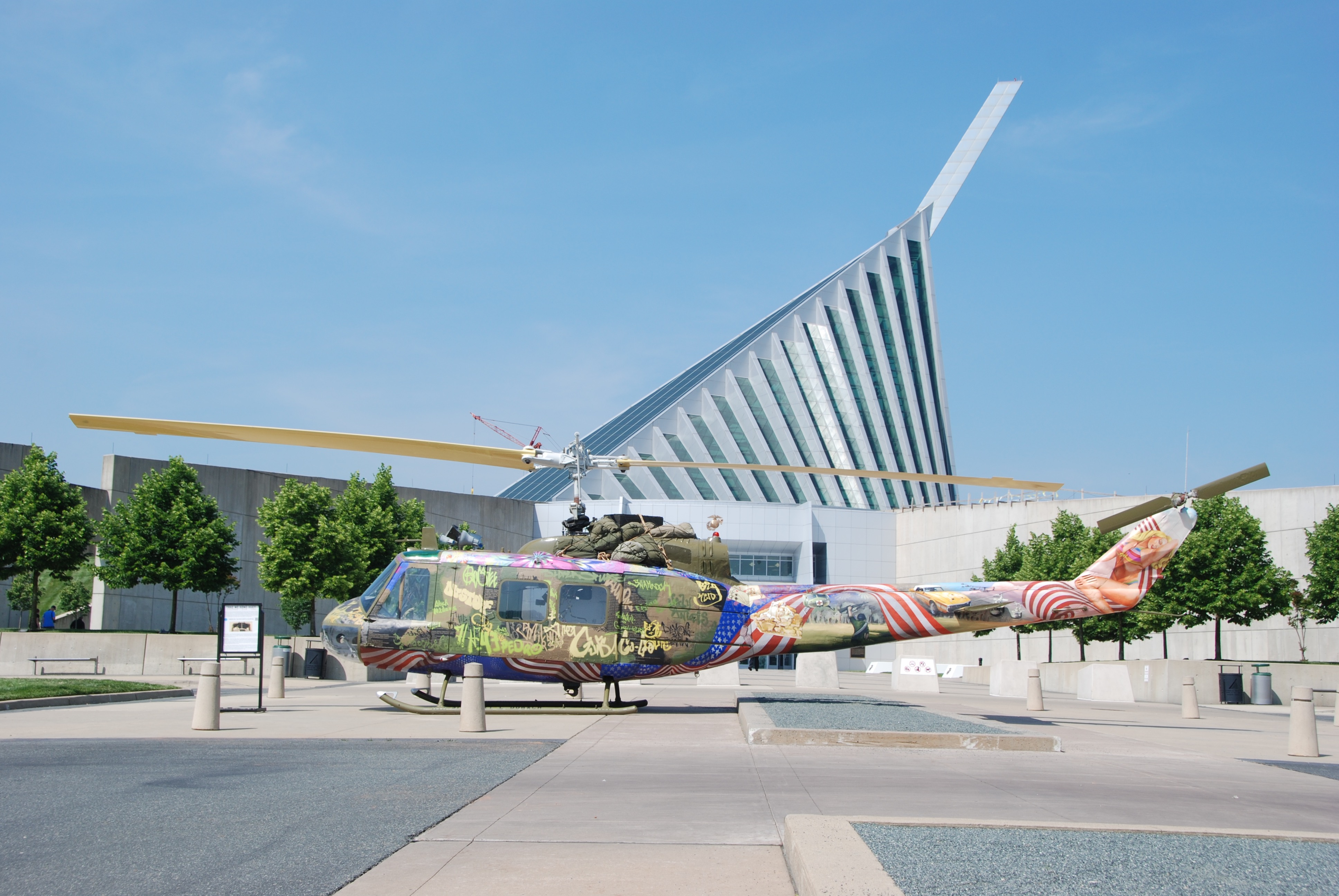
The Take Me Home Huey helicopter in front of the National Museum of the Marine Corps.

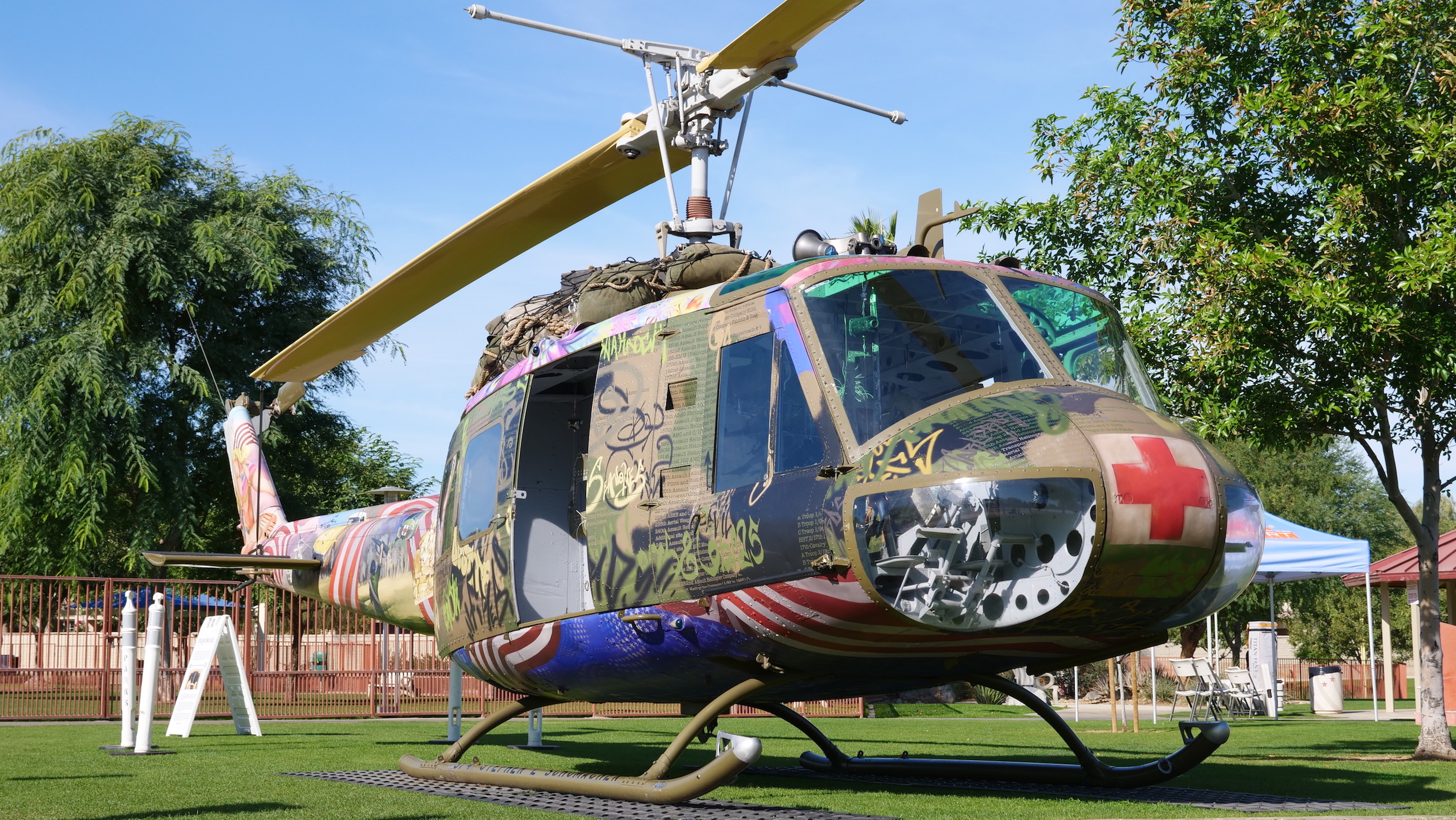
The Take Me Home Huey art sculpture on exhibit in Palm Desert.

Steve Maloney partnered with Light Horse Legacy, a 501(c) non-profit organization that restores old military helicopters and is an official partner of the U.S. Vietnam War Commemoration. The organization's co-founder, Dave Barron, discovered Huey #174 in an Arizona boneyard and restored the fuselage with the help of volunteers and veterans. Barron also researched the history of Huey #174 and learned that it crashed during a medevac mission on 14. February 1969 in the Binh Long province of Vietnam. The crew chief and medic were fatally injured, the crew pilot, co-pilot and door gunner survived.

Take Me Home Huey is a mixed-media project, including the helicopter sculpture, a documentary film and a song. The film documents Maloney's transformation of a Vietnam-era medevac helicopter into a colorful sculpture with a mission to help veterans recover from Post-Traumatic Stress. As Huey #174 morphs from wounded war bird into a vivid sculpture, viewers witness the power of art to heal surviving soldiers and families of the fallen. Together artist Steve Maloney and Light Horse Legacy tour the sculptural installation across the United States to honor veterans of all conflicts and raise awareness of the challenges of Post-Traumatic-Stress. The original song composed and performed for Take Me Home Huey by Jeanie Cunningham is used in the film, is performed live at events across the United States, and can be purchased as a single on iTunes.

The documentary film Take Me Home Huey first aired on PBS SoCal on October, 10th, 2017. The film was co-directed and co-produced by Alicia Brauns and Christine Steele and won the Audience Award for Best Documentary Feature at the Palm Springs Film Festival in 2017. The film was reviewed by The Hollywood Reporter, won a Bronze Telly Award in 2018 for TV Social Responsibility Programming and won a Los Angeles area Emmy Award 2018 in the Arts category. The PBS SoCal version of the film currently airs on PBS. The 29 venues where Take Me Home Huey has been exhibited include the National Museum of the Marine Corps, the Udvar Hazy Center, The Henry Ford Museum, Ronald Reagan Presidential Foundation & Institute, The Palm Springs Air Museum, EAA Aviation Museum, Coronado Island Film Festival, the Navy Centennial Celebration and the Nevada Museum of Art.

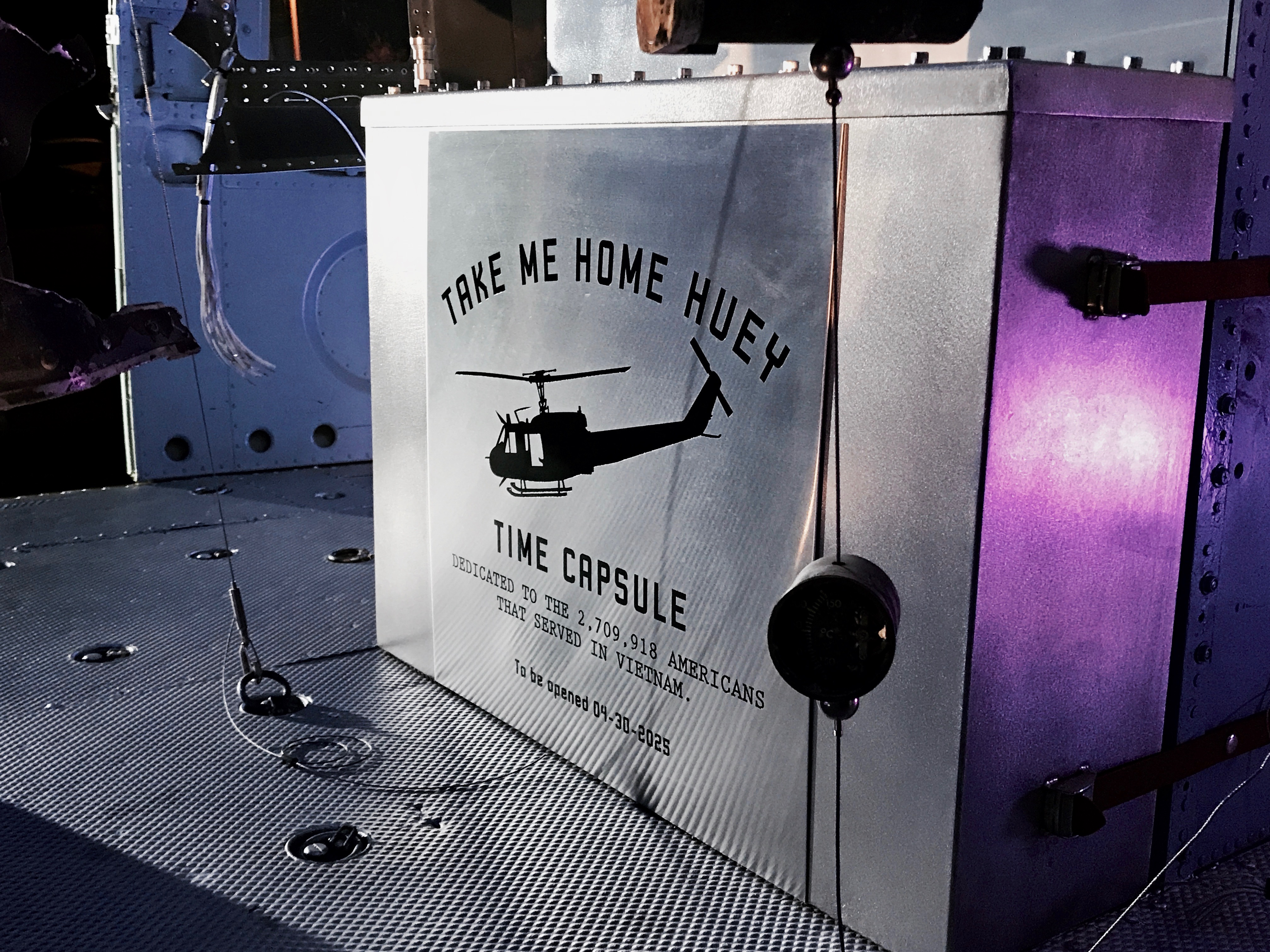
Inside the Huey helicopter is a time capsule with original veteran artifacts. The art project by is dedicated to the 2,709,918 Americans that served in the Vietnam War.

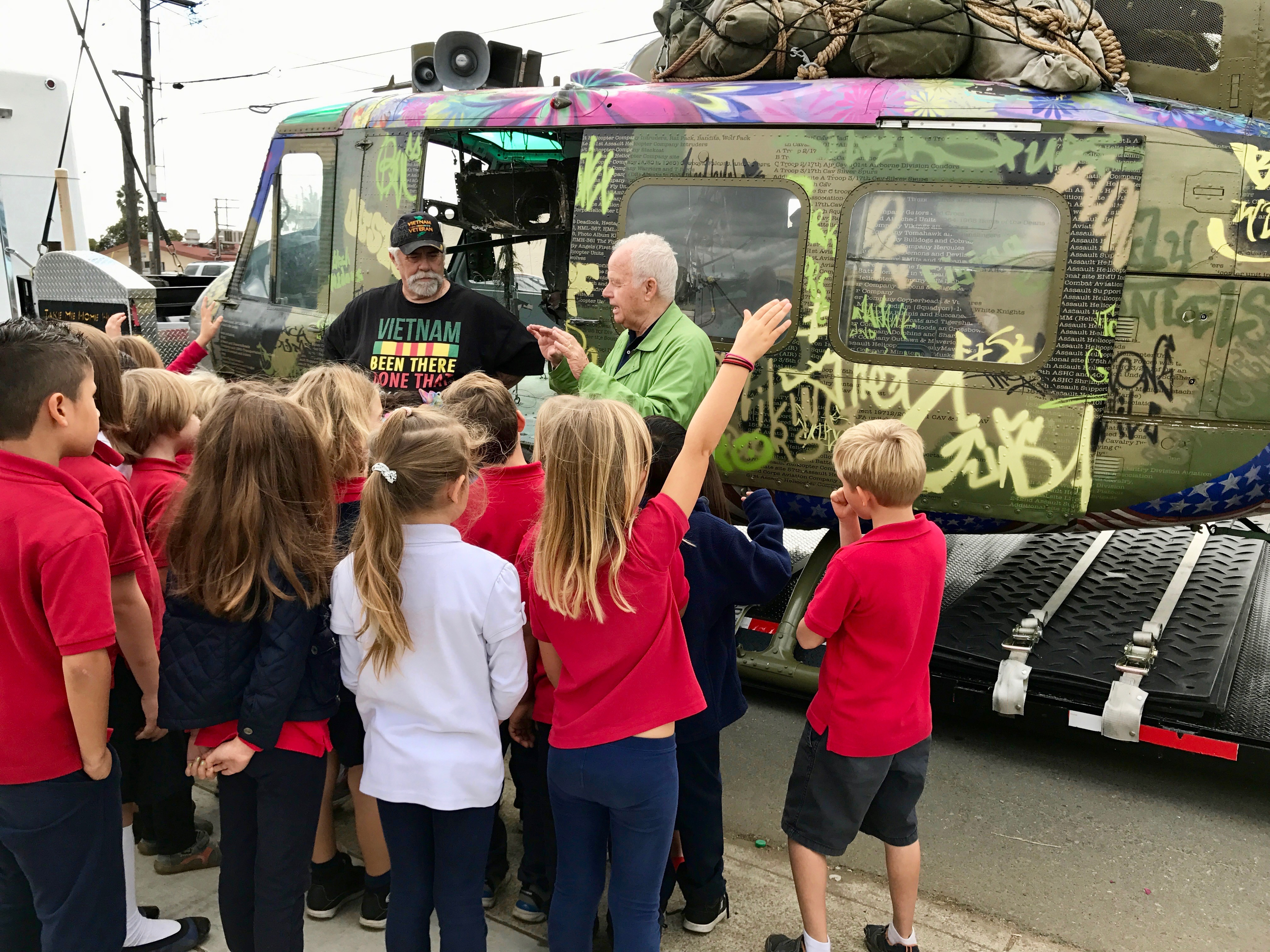
Dedicated to veterans and education, Take Me Home Huey tours the United States with the aim of raising awareness for PTSD.
