= Jeanie Cunningham =

American singer-songwriter (1956–2024)

Jean Akin Cunningham
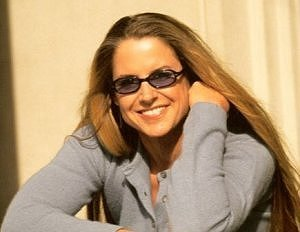
- Born: Susan Swift; September 3, 1956 (age 69); Los Angeles, California, U.S.
- Died: November 16, 2024 (aged 68)
- Other names: JaeCie, JC
- Occupations: Performer, composer, producer, businesswoman, executive producer and host of The Composers Corner
- Years active: 1976 – 2024
- Spouse: Margaret (m. 2013)
- Website: http://www.jaecie.com/

Jean Akin Cunningham (September 3, 1956 – November 16, 2024) was an American performer, composer, songwriter, producer, writer and host of the video based web site The Composers Corner. She toured with Lionel Richie, David Crosby of Crosby, Stills, Nash and Young and worked closely with Ike and Tina Turner. She was also the co-author and voice of the ongoing children's audio book series Los Diggities, written about three rescued dogs living in Los Angeles (first published in 2010). Seven cds of her music have been released on both domestic and international labels, as well as 2 performance DVDs.

Her music has been heard as part of several high-profile product campaigns, with corporations such as Mitsubishi, Epson, Yamaha, Toshiba, and Chevron being among the many to utilize her original works. Being anonymously responsible for a number of musical wakeup broadcasts to Space Shuttle astronauts from NASA's mission control during the late 1980s through the early 90s, earned Cunningham the nickname, "The Most Flown Unknown".

Known for her leadership in the struggle for gay rights (with particular emphasis on Christianity and its role in the LGBT community) Cunningham released a controversial Christian album, Come As You Are...To The Father, on the internet for free in 2000.

In 2002, Cunningham was commissioned to write, record and perform a tribute song to the United States in commemoration of the September 11 attacks for the country of Aruba. The song, "We Will Remember" has since been used to commemorate Memorial Day, Veterans Day and Pearl Harbor Day memorials as well as 9-11, making it a 21st-century anthem.

In 2014, multi-media artist Steve Maloney commissioned Cunningham to write a song commemorating the Vietnam War veteran for Maloney's "Take Me Home Huey" project. The project involved taking a Huey helicopter that had been shot down in Vietnam and brought back to the U.S., rebuilding it (through a partnership with Lighthorse Legacy), then turning it into a colorful sculpture to facilitate dialogue for Vietnam veterans and raise awareness and funds for Post Traumatic Stress. In addition to the helicopter and song, a documentary film was made of the project, going by the same title of Take Me Home Huey, which won the 2016 Palm Springs Film Festival’s Mercedes Benz Audience Favorite award and has since been aired nationally on PBS in conjunction with the Ken Burns The Vietnam War series. In November 2017 the song earned Cunningham Congressional recognition from Congressman Mark Amodei of Nevada. The documentary also won an Emmy for Best Arts in 2018.

== Biography ==
=== Career ===
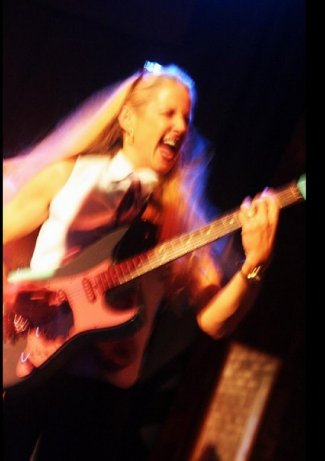
Jeanie "JaeCie" Cunningham performing in 2009

After touring internationally with the all-female band The Cherries, Cunningham began building her own recording studio, Resnik-One (named after astronaut Judith Resnik who died in the Challenger disaster), in Los Angeles. During this time, she also attended the American Academy of Dramatic Arts, developing her acting skills with the intention of one day performing in musical theatre. But the skills she had developed as a musician and composer ultimately won out and she soon found herself on the road with other acts. Between tours as a guitarist with Lionel Richie's band and as an opening act for David Crosby, Cunningham continued to hone her skills as a songwriter, including writing for high-profile international corporations. Hired to write songs for everything from "toilet seat covers to secret sauce", Cunningham continued to develop her abilities in composition while developing considerable production and arrangement skills in the process.

Her performances as a solo artist took her around the world, from Beijing to Cairo, as well as much of Europe and the U.S. with her band, JaeCie. Cunningham recorded 7 different albums (on almost as many record labels) both nationally and internationally. Described as a "happy collision between Sheryl Crow and Anastacia" by a Texan disc jockey, Jeanie's music embraces a wide variance of styles, with R&B and folk music being the backbone behind her sound.

In addition to her pursuits as a solo recording artist and "custom-songwriter", Cunningham began developing a new TV show called The Composers' Corner in 2003, dedicated to "interviewing musicians by musicians, exploring new gadgets and techniques, dissecting songs, and giving the viewer a window into the world of music creation". In 2007, The Composers Corner moved to the internet with its own website dedicated to the education of music to those who are interested in pursuing it as a career.

Cunningham performed at the Sommet Center in Nashville (2007) and the New Orleans Morial Convention Center (2008) with Shaklee Corporation CEO, Roger Barnett. The two of them penned a song for the Shaklee Company, "You Can Have It All" which they recorded together in Hollywood's Cherokee Studios. That recording was the last recording ever made at Cherokee before it closed its doors after over 40 years. (Music Connection Article)

In October 2015, Cunningham performed at the International Expo in Milan, Italy on behalf of her alma mater, the American School in Switzerland. She continued to remain active both as a performer and a teacher of "music composition with lyrical compatibility" and ukuleles to both school children and teachers.

== Discography ==
=== Albums with band ===
- Up for Grabs with the JaeCie Band.
- Between the Lines (1996)
- Thief in the Night(1998)

=== Singles ===
- Thief in the Night (1998)
- Reason-4-Livin (1997)
  - Rose to #4 on the OutVoice Top 40 Chart (National Gay and Lesbian Charts).
- We will remember - Aruba's tribute to America (2002)

=== Solo albums ===
- Point of you (1981)
- CAYA - Come as you are to the Father (1999)
  - 2000 Gay & Lesbian American Music Awards (GLAMA) nominee
- Phoenix Rising (2006)

== Dula the Musical ==
Dula the Musical (2006) In 2007, after a six-year dedicated effort, Cunningham completed 23 compositions for her first musical, DULA (from the play written by Paul Elliott), which gives a detailed and dramatic history of the folk-song legend Tom Dooley, presenting him as an innocent man who was hung for a crime he did not commit in the years immediately following the Civil War. Its first staged reading was performed at Northwestern University in 2012 and the world premiere of the full production took place at the Oh Look! Performing Arts Center near Dallas, Texas, in 2015.

- The Academy of New Musical Theatre announces winners
  - The Alliance of Los Angeles Playwrights

== Literary work ==
Los Diggities (2015) A book series about rescued dogs.

  - Los Diggities

She and co-author Elisabeth Thormodsrud are published by Musikk-Husets Forlag A/S for their Norwegian Ukulele instruction textbook Gøy Med Ukulele i Klasserommet.
