= David Mayernik (architect) =

American architect, city planner, and artist (born 1960)

David Mayernik FAAR, FRSA
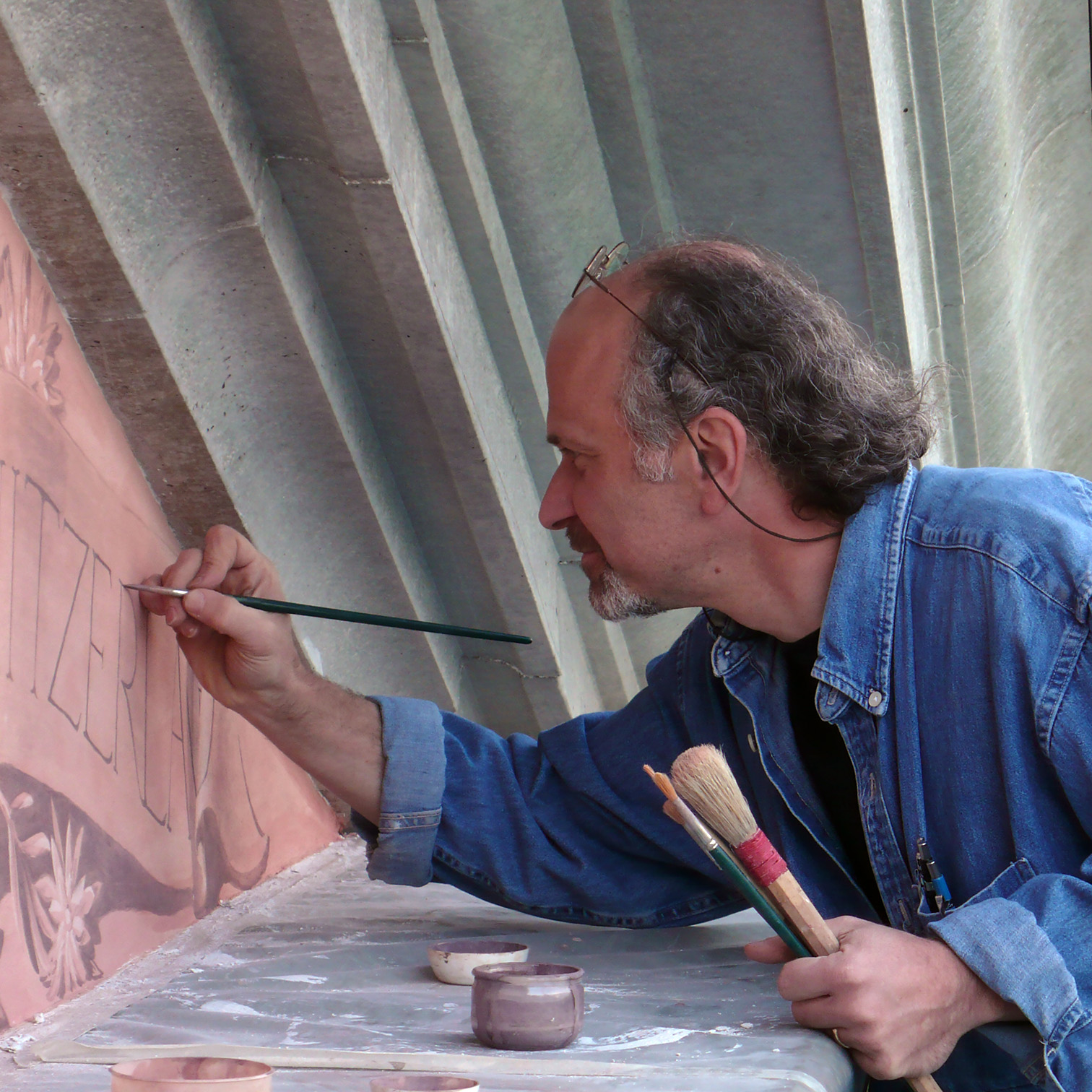
- Painting frescoes at TASIS Switzerland; Palmer Center theater, 2010.
- Website: www.davidmayernik.com

David Mayernik (born 1960) is an American architect and artist. He is a fellow of the American Academy in Rome and the Royal Society of Arts. He has received numerous awards including the Palladio award from the magazines Traditional Building, and Period Homes, and the Traditional Building Conference, for the M. Crist Fleming Library of The American School in Switzerland (TASIS) in Collina d’Oro, Canton Ticino, Switzerland.

== Early life and education ==
David Thomas Mayernik is one of two children born to Emma C. Dalmas Mayernik, an artist and poet, and Joseph Mayernik, a homebuilder and improviser. A grandfather had been a stonemason in the Veneto region of Italy. As a young student Mayernik was always drawing, and in 7th grade he represented his school in a mural project for a new parking garage in Allentown. Mayernik graduated from Allentown Central Catholic High School in 1978. He then earned a B.Arch. from the University of Notre Dame's School of Architecture cum laude in 1983.

== Career ==
Mayernik and design partner Thomas N. Rajkovich won the 1986 international landscape design competition to design the Minnesota state capitol grounds, and precinct bridges in St. Paul. The project received a special award from the Minnesota chapter of the American Society of Landscape Architects, and an Arthur Ross award from the Classical America Society in 1987. Mayernik then took the Steedman prize for a fellowship year at the American Academy in Rome from 1988 to 1989. In 1995 he was named one of "40 Under 40" young designers by a jury chaired by architect Robert A. M. Stern, and including Walter Chatham, and Frances Halsband. He is a past member of the International Network for Traditional Building, Architecture and Urbanism (INTBAU), founded by Charles III.

He is professor emeritus of the architecture faculty of the University of Notre Dame, where he taught both in South Bend, Indiana, and Rome, Italy. He also taught in the graduate fine art program of the New York Academy of Art, at the Institute for the Study of Classical Architecture, and with the University of Virginia's Erasmus-Jefferson Scholars Summer in Tuscany program.

Mayernik is the architect and campus planner for the TASIS schools of Lugano, Switzerland, Surrey, UK, and Sintra, Portugal. In 2016 he received an INTBAU Excellence Award, honourable mention, for urban design, and a jury prize in the Prix Européen d’Architecture Philippe Rotthier, in 2014. As noted above, his design of the M. Crist Fleming library at TASIS Switzerland also won Traditional Building magazine's 2005 Palladio award.

As an artist he paints in oil, watercolor, and the Italian wet-plaster technique buon fresco, having studied with Italian artist Leonetto Tintori. Buildings he designs, and some Italian churches and opera sets, have featured his frescoes. In 2013 he won a competition in Lucca, Tuscany, to paint its Palio for the feast of San Paolino (Saint Paulinus of Antioch, an early bishop of Lucca).

== Publications ==
Mayernik is the author of two books, Timeless Cities: An Architect's Reflections on Renaissance Italy (Westview, 2003), and The Challenge of Emulation in Art and Architecture: Between Imitation and Invention (Ashgate, 2013). Among his academic contributions are publishing the chapter "The Baroque City" in The Oxford Handbook of the Baroque; editing a new edition of John Barrington Bayley's Letarouilly on Renaissance Rome and contributing the introduction; and publishing the chapter, "The Shape of Public Space: Place, Space and Junkspace" in Perspectives on Public Space in Rome, from Antiquity to the Present Day (Routledge 2013). He has a chapter on the Palazzo Te, featuring Giulio Romano's architecture and frescoes, in Aeolian Winds and the Spirit in Renaissance Architecture. Another chapter, "Bodies & Buildings: Microcosm and Macrocosm in Traditional Architecture and Urbanism," is in the Rizzoli book Green Living: Architecture and Planning. He has published regularly in Traditional Building magazine, and he published a scholarly reconstruction and reimagining of the Ninfeo di Bramante ruins in the comune of Genazzano, Lazio, Italy.

== Personal life ==
He and his wife live in Italy and the United States.
