= Linhó, Sintra =

Village in Lisbon Region, Portugal

Coordinates: 38°46′N 9°23′W

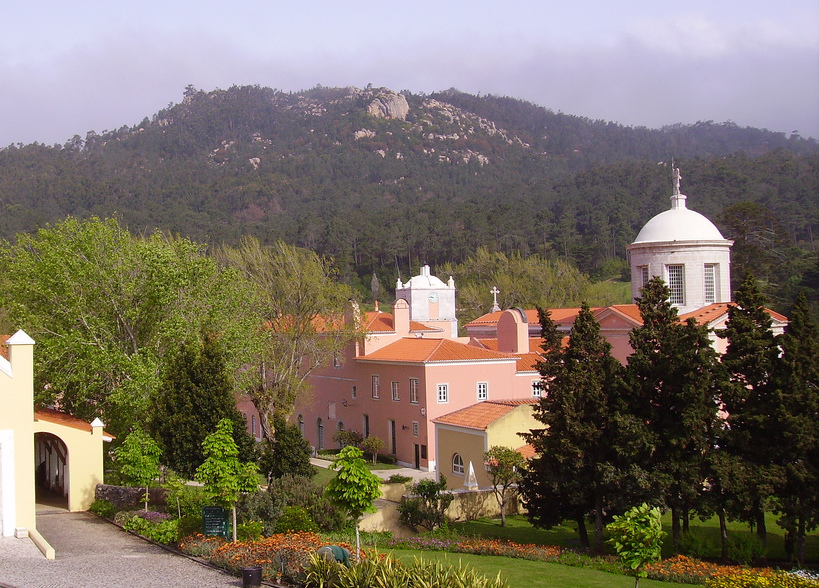
The Igreja da Penha Longa in Linhó with the Sintra Mountains in the background.

Linhó is an affluent village in the municipality of Sintra, on the Portuguese Riviera, known for its resorts, restaurants, and its two prominent gated communities, Quinta da Penha Longa and Quinta da Beloura. Linhó is home to a large expatriate community, the only American school in Portugal (Carlucci American International School of Lisbon), and has hosted a Bilderberg Meeting.

Linhó is known for its gourmet culinary scene, including, artisanal food shops, fine dining, and events like Christmas markets and its annual Artisanal Beer Festival.

== History ==
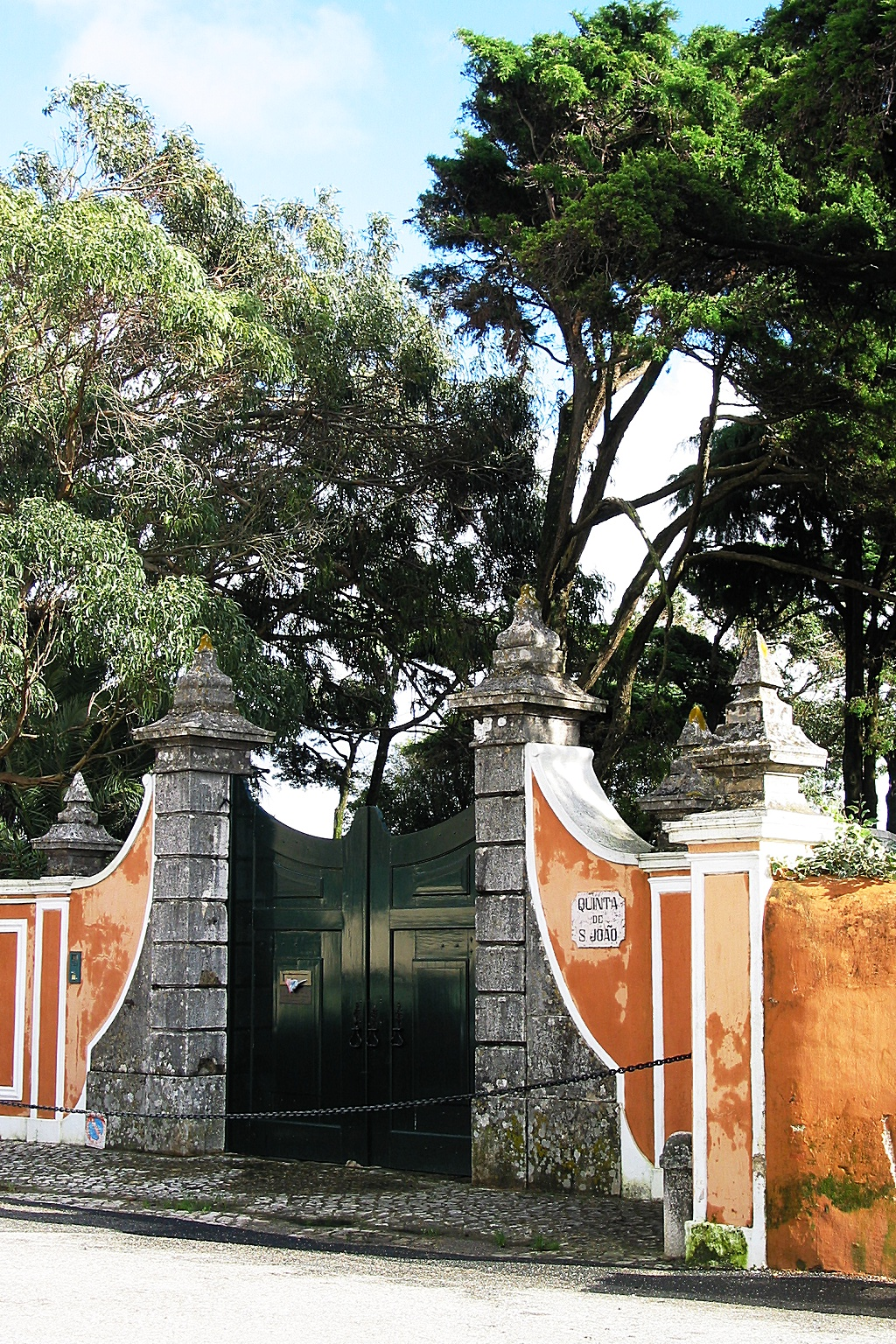
Traditional villa in the historic center of Linhó.

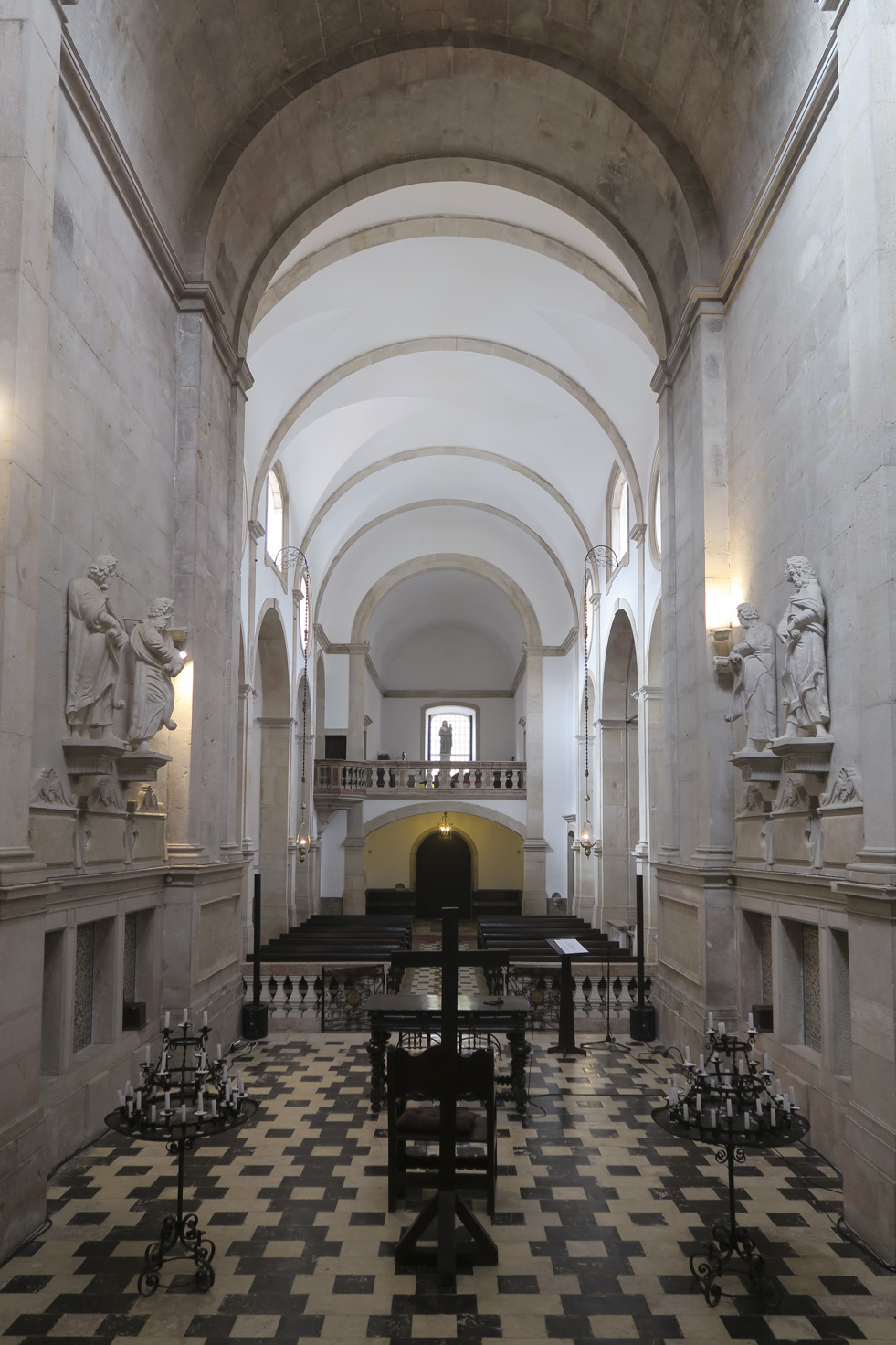
Cardinal-King Henry I of Portugal built the interior of the Igreja da Penha Longa.

The Igreja da Penha Longa and its Hieronymite convent date originally to the 14th century, but the church's current interior dates from the reign of Cardinal-King Henry I of Portugal, in the 16th century.

On 12 April 1903, the Grupo União Recreativa do Linhó (Linhó Recreational Union), a society for local civic life, is founded.

Famed South African poet Roy Campbell lived in Linhó in the 1950s, from 1956 until his death.

Marcelo Caetano, 101st Prime Minister of Portugal and last leader of the Estado Novo regime, had his summer home in Linhó. Beginning in 1958, Caetano, then an ousted politician and Rector of the University of Lisbon, began using his Linhó home to host meetings and plan his assent to become Prime Minister, which he became in 1968. A street is named for him in Linhó, despite attempts to change the name owing to Caetano's relationship to the Estado Novo regime.

In 1998, Hillary Clinton, then First Lady of the United States, inaugurated the newly built campus of the American International School of Lisbon in Linhó.

The 1999 Bilderberg Meeting was hosted at the Ritz-Carlton Penha Longa Resort in Quinta da Penha Longa.

=== Communities ===
Linhó is home to two prominent gated communities of the Portuguese Riviera:

- Quinta da Penha Longa
- Quinta da Beloura

== Tourism ==
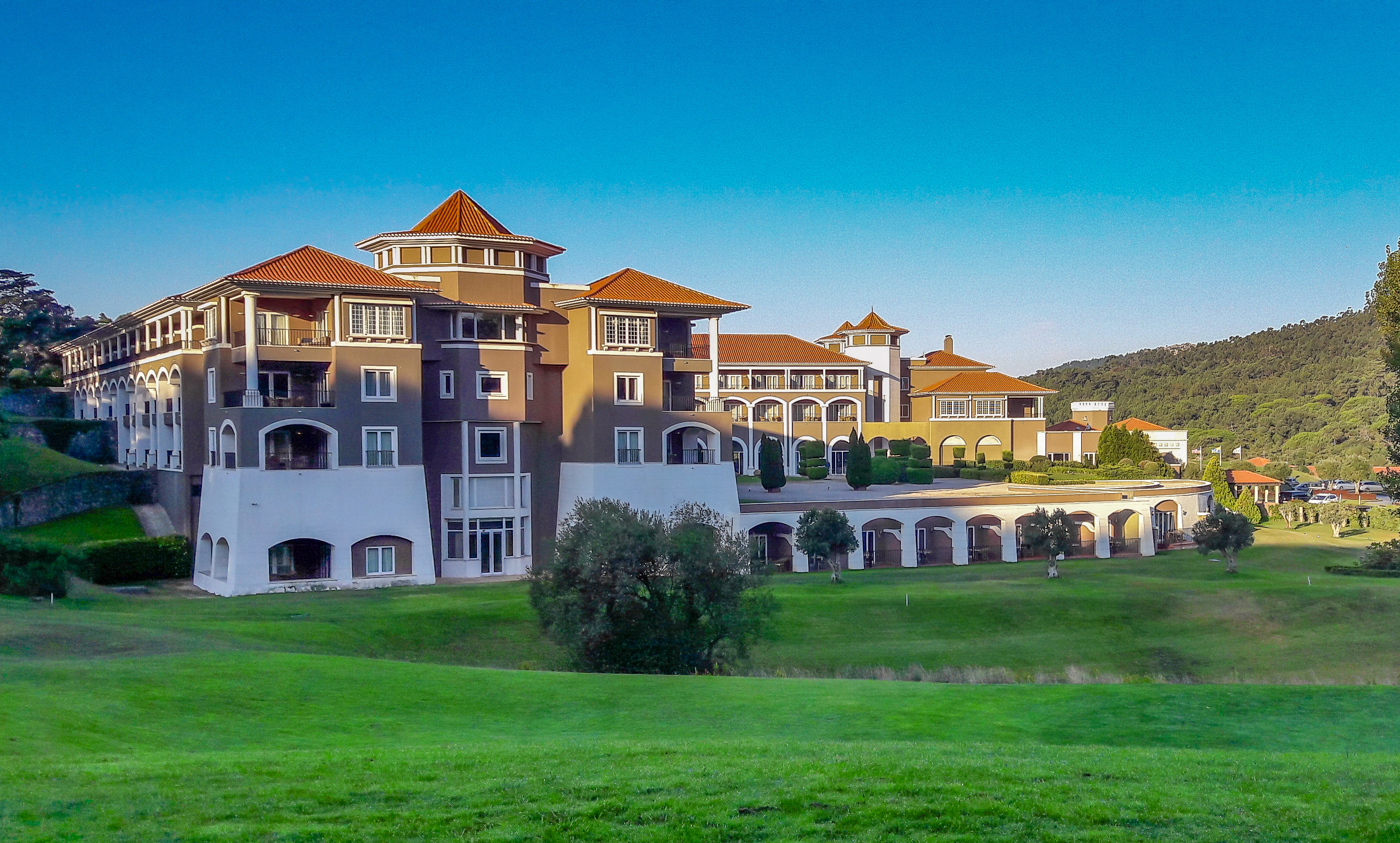
The Ritz-Carlton Penha Longa Resort was voted best resort in the Iberian Peninsula in 2018 and hosted the 1999 Bilderberg Meeting.

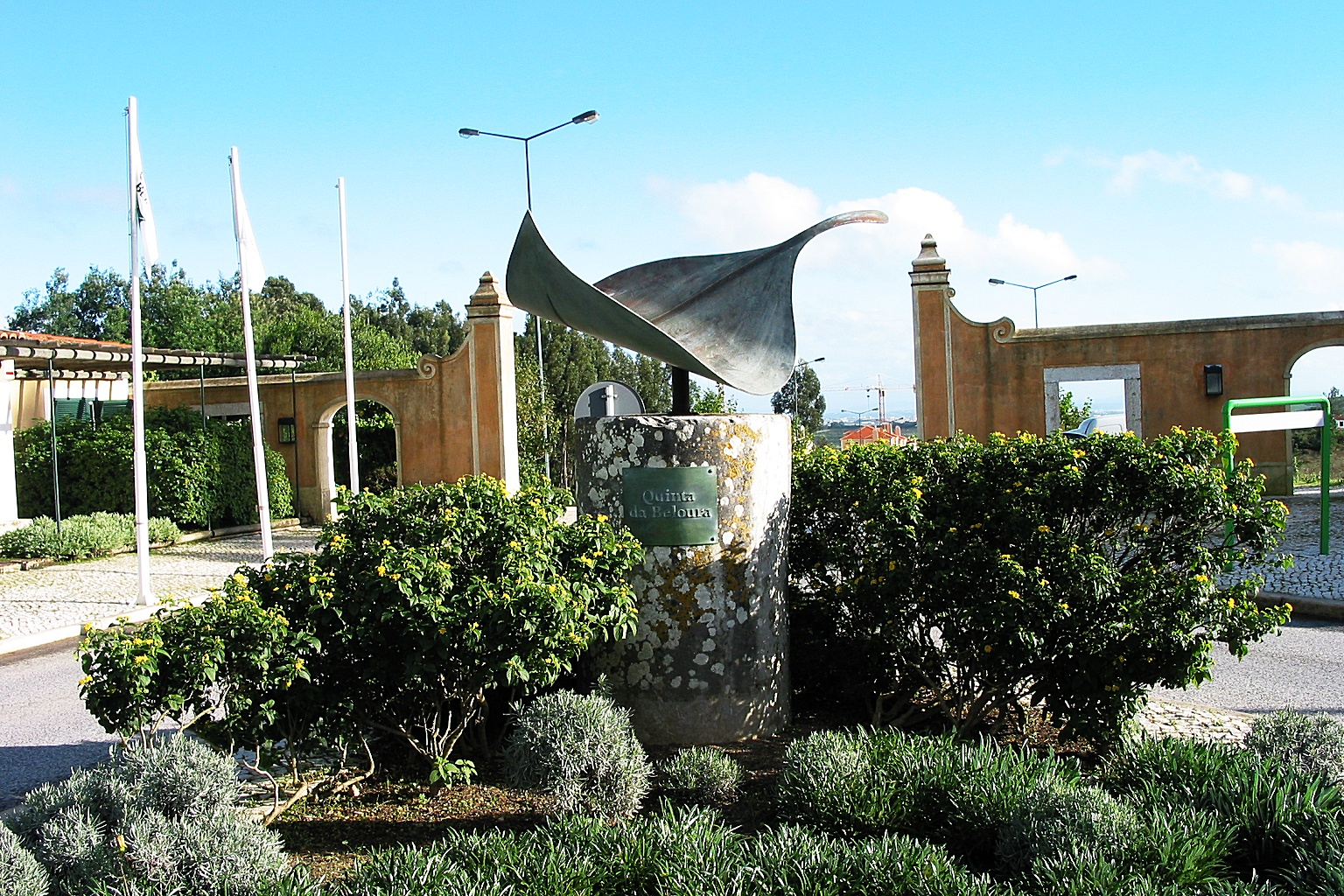
Quinta da Beloura is known for the numerous golf, tennis, and equestrian events it hosts, as well as for being the home of numerous celebrities.

Linhó is near to numerous UNESCO World Heritage Sites, such as Pena National Palace, Queluz National Palace, and the Historic Centre of Sintra, as well as numerous landmarks and sites within the larger Portuguese Riviera. Linhó is a prominent gastronomy, spa, and resort destination.

=== Gastronomy ===
Linhó is home to two Michelin Guide-starred restaurants:

- LAB by Sergi Arola
- Midori

=== Resorts ===
- Pestana Golf Resort - Quinta da Beloura
- Ritz-Carlton Resort - Quinta da Penha Longa

=== Golf ===
Quinta da Beloura's golf courses were designed by American golf architect Rocky Roquemore, and Quinta da Penha Longa's courses were designed by Robert Trent Jones Jr.

Penha Longa has hosted the Open de Portugal three times, the Estoril Challenge de Portugal twice, and the Estoril Open once.

Beloura holds the Portuguese Golf Federation's annual National Senior's Championship.

=== Tennis ===
Linhó's Beloura Tennis Academy (BTA) has hosted the Portuguese Tennis Federation's prestigious Campeonato Nacional Absoluto (National Absolute Championship) in 2017. BTA is known for hosting the annual Beloura Junior Open, a European qualifying tournament.

Since 2017, Beloura annually hosts the BTA Futures, part of the International Tennis Federation's Men's Circuit.

=== Equestrian ===
Linhó's Quinta da Beloura Equestrian Center (Portuguese: Centro Hípico Quinta da Beloura) holds numerous equestrian events including the Portuguese Equestrian Federation's 2015 Taça de Portugal (Portuguese Cup Championship). The Beloura team won this event in 2004.

Beloura hosted the 2017 Portuguese National Horseball Championship, as well as the 2017 and 2018 Troféu de Dressage em Póneis (English: Pony Dressage Trophy), an annual dressage competition held between equestrian academies of the Portuguese Riviera.

== Education ==
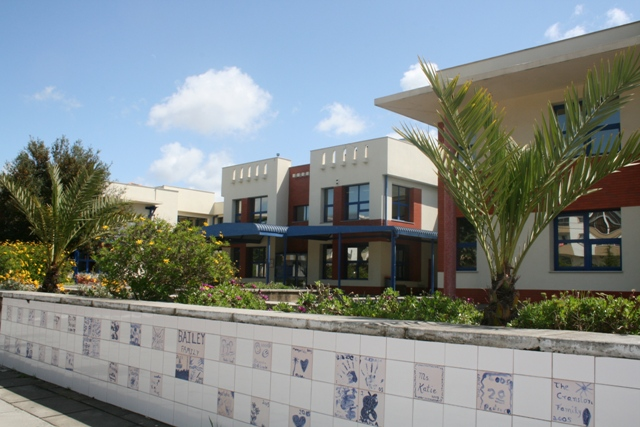
The American International School of Lisbon, in the center of Linhó.

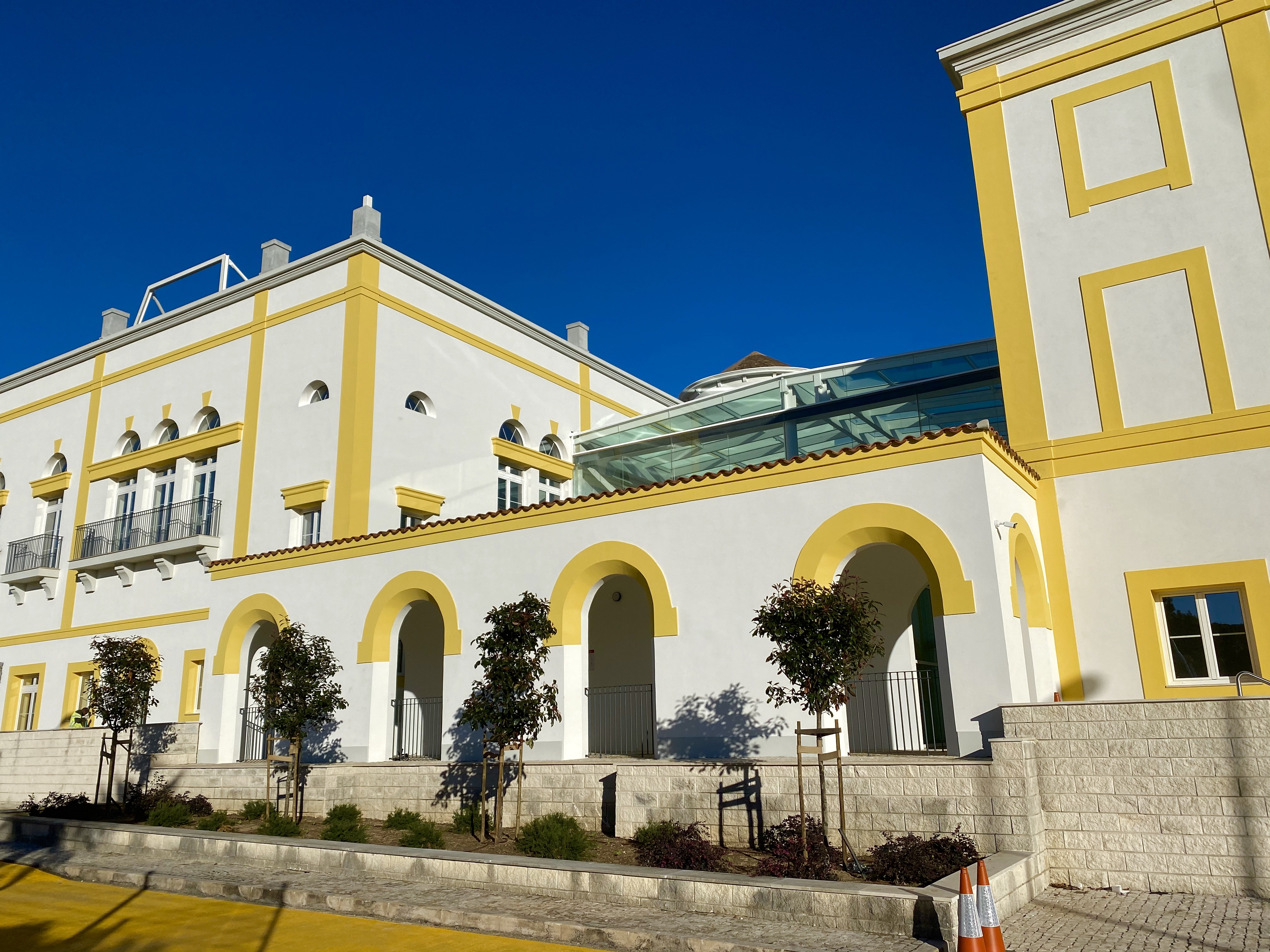
TASIS Portugal, located inside of Linhó's Quinta da Beloura.

The Carlucci American International School of Lisbon is the oldest American school in the Iberian Peninsula and the only U.S. State Department-sanctioned school in Portugal.

In 2020, TASIS Schools, a highly ranked private Swiss group of international boarding schools, established TASIS Portugal in Linhó.

== Notable people ==
- Cristiano Ronaldo, Portuguese footballer
- Bryan Adams - Grammy Award-winning Canadian musician
- Marcelo Caetano, 101st Prime Minister of Portugal
- José Sócrates, 117th Prime Minister of Portugal
- Dânia Neto, Portuguese model and actress
- Roy Campbell, famed South African poet
- Artur Pizarro - Portuguese concert pianist
- Suzanne Anton - Canadian politician, former Attorney General of British Columbia
- Pedro Pinto - Chief of Press for UEFA, former CNN International anchor
- Shahal M. Khan, American owner of the Plaza Hotel in New York City

== See also ==
- Sintra
- Portuguese Riviera
