= TASIS Schools =

Group of international day and boarding schools

TASIS Schools TASIS Foundation

Information
- Type: Group of international boarding schools
- Established: 1956
- Founder: Mary Crist Fleming
- Grades: Pre-K — 12
- Gender: Co-ed
- Colors: Blue and red
- Chairman: W. Thomas Fleming
- TASIS Schools: TASIS Switzerland; TASIS England (United Kingdom); TASIS Portugal; TASIS Dorado (Puerto Rico)
- Website: Official website

TASIS Schools, formally established as the TASIS Foundation, is a private Swiss foundation which operates a group of four international schools (including both day and boarding schools), operating in Switzerland, England, Portugal, and Puerto Rico. The acronym brand TASIS stands for The American School in Switzerland, which was the original school before its expansion internationally.

== History ==
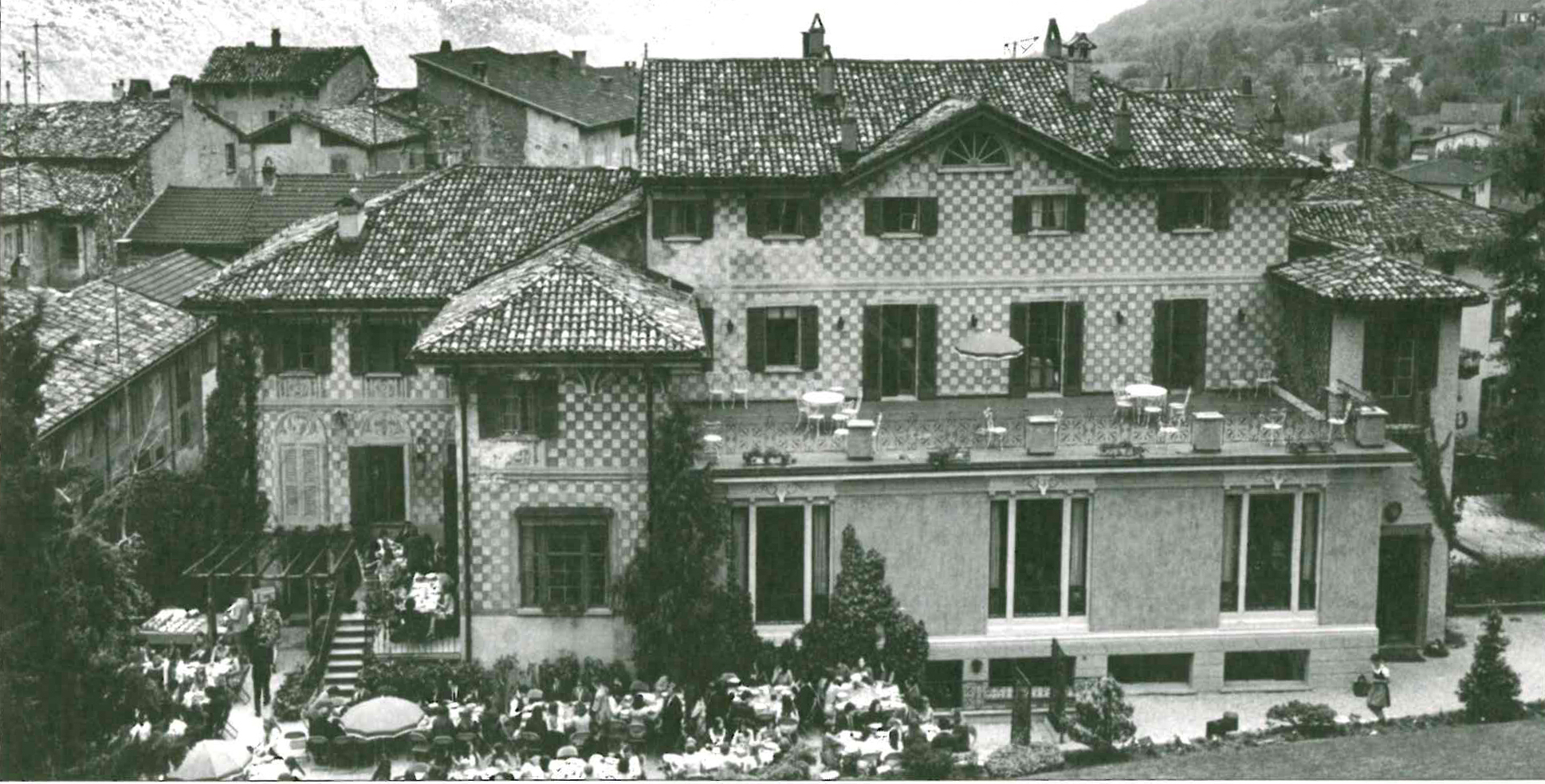
TASIS Switzerland campus in 1972

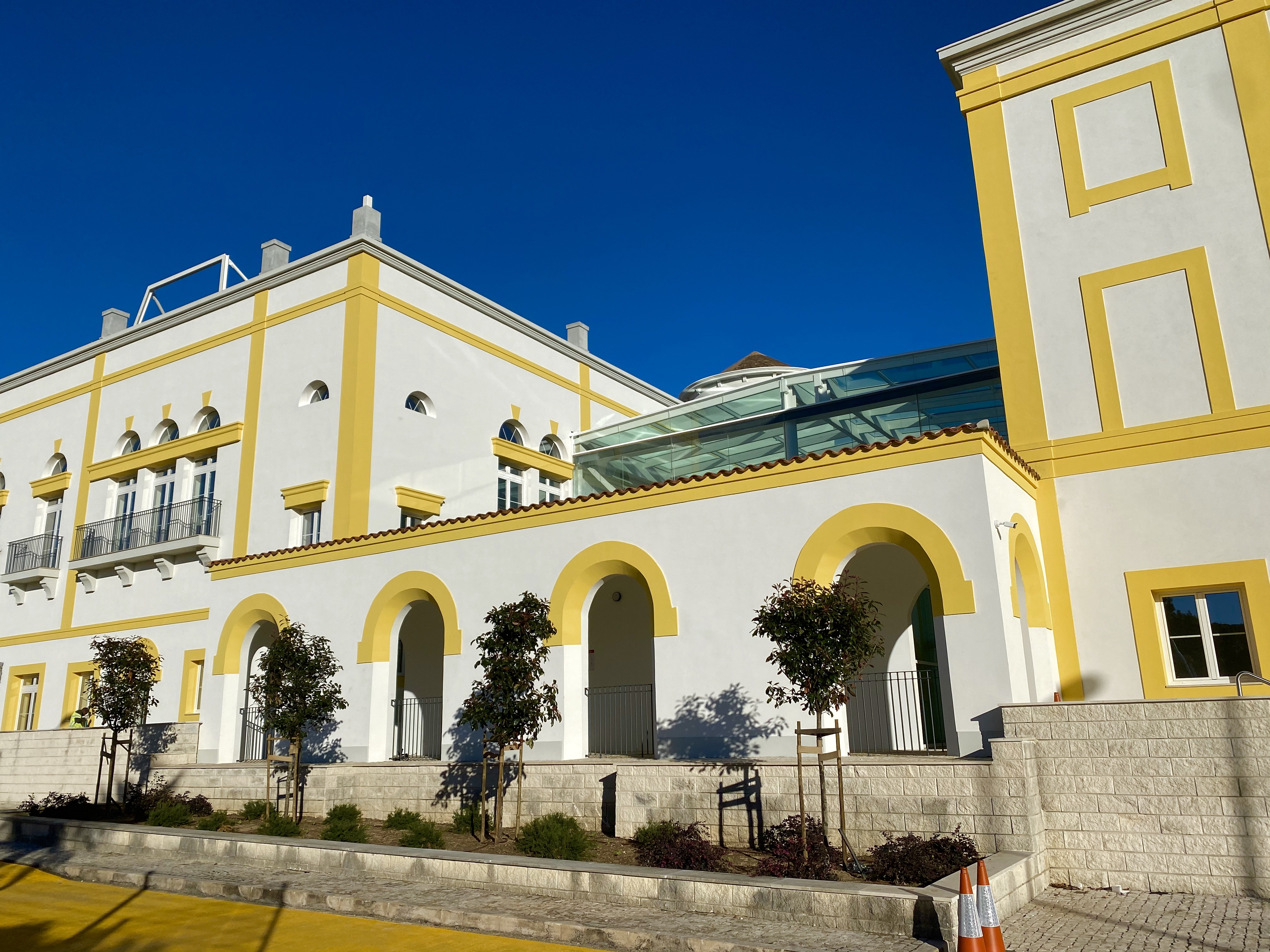
TASIS Portugal campus

The group originated with the foundation of its first boarding school, TASIS Switzerland, in Lugano, Switzerland, in 1956.

TASIS England was founded in 1976, in Thorpe, Surrey, outside of London.

TASIS Dorado was founded in Puerto Rico in 2002.

TASIS Portugal was founded in 2020, in Linhó, Sintra on the Portuguese Riviera, outside Lisbon.

== Schools ==
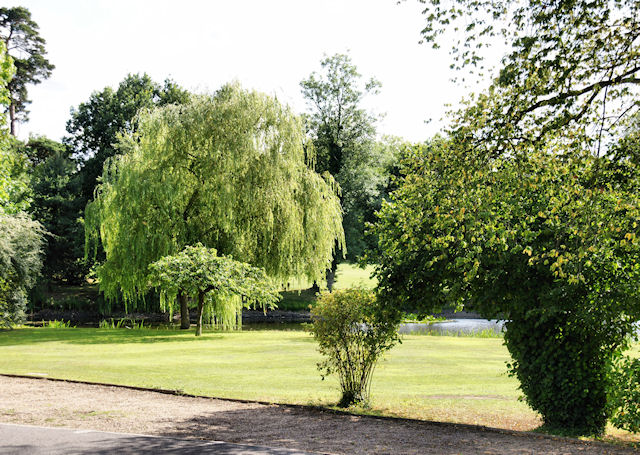
Grounds of TASIS England

- TASIS Switzerland in Montagnola, Collina d'Oro, outside of Lugano
- TASIS England, in Thorpe, Surrey, outside of London
- TASIS Portugal, in Linhó, Sintra, outside of Lisbon
- TASIS Dorado, in Dorado, Puerto Rico, outside of San Juan
