= David Williams (crime writer) =

David Stuart Williams (8 June 1926 – 26 September 2003) was an advertising executive who became a crime writer after suffering a stroke.

Williams was born in Bridgend in Wales and studied at the Hereford Cathedral School and St John's College, Oxford, where he read Modern History. His university studies were interrupted by World War II when Williams spent three years as an officer in the Royal Navy.

He started in advertising as a medical copywriter, rising through the ranks to head David Williams and Ketchum, regarded as one of the largest and most successful advertising agencies in the country. He suffered a severe stroke in 1977 and whilst he eventually made a more or less complete recovery, he suffered partial paralysis and impaired speech for a time and realised that he would not be able to return to the stresses of life in the advertising industry. He had written crime fiction in his spare time, with Unholy Writ being written before his stroke in 1976. He turned from advertising to writing "whodunnits": he wrote 23 novels in all, most featuring Mark Treasure, graduate of Jesus College, Oxford and vice-chairman of a merchant bank, and his successful actress wife Molly. A second series of books featured Chief Inspector Merlin Parry of the South Wales Constabulary, together with Sergeant Gomer Lloyd. His books were twice shortlisted for the Crime Writers' Association Gold Dagger award and he was elected as a member of the prestigious Detection Club in 1988. He also was a churchwarden of St Mary Aldermary and a governor of Pusey House, Oxford.

His ashes are interred in the churchyard of St Mary, Thorpe, Surrey - the nearest Anglo-Catholic parish church to his home, where he had been a cantor and regular worshipper for many years.

== Novels ==
Mark Treasure

- Unholy Writ (1977)
- Treasure by Degrees (1977)
- Treasure in Smoke (1978)
- Murder for Treasure (1980)
- Copper, Gold and Treasure (1982)
- Treasure Preserved (1983)
- Advertise for Treasure (1984)
- Wedding Treasure (1985)
- Treasure in Advent (1985)
- Treasure in Roubles (1987)
- Divided Treasure (1988)
- Holy Treasure! (1989)
- Treasure in Oxford (1990)
- Prescription for Murder (1990)
- Treasure by Post (1991)
- Planning on Murder (1992)
- Banking on Murder (1993)

Chief Inspector Parry

- Last Seen Breathing (1994)
- Death of a Prodigal (1996)
- Dead in the Market (1998)
- A Terminal Case (1998)
- Suicide Intended (1999)
- Practise to Deceive (2003)
