= TASIS Switzerland =

School in Montagnola, Collina D'Oro, Switzerland

Location
- Montagnola, Lugano, Canton of Ticino, 6926; Switzerland
- 45.9829°N 8.9168°E

Information
- School type: American international school (Day & boarding school)
- Established: 1956
- Sister school: TASIS Schools
- Headmaster: Christopher Nikoloff
- Grades: Pre-K — 12
- Enrollment: 700
- Colors: Blue and red
- Mascot: TASIS Tigers
- Affiliations: NEASC
- Website: tasis.ch

TASIS or TASIS Switzerland, formally known as The American School In Switzerland, is a private American international boarding and day school in Switzerland. Located in Montagnola, Collina D'Oro near Lugano, in the Canton of Ticino, the school enrolls approximately 700 pupils from around the world. It offers a primary school, middle school and high school.

== Accreditation ==
=== Switzerland ===
TASIS's (upper) secondary education (middle and high school) is not approved as a Mittelschule/Collège/Liceo by the Swiss Federal State Secretariat for Education, Research and Innovation (SERI), meaning it does not offer the Swiss Federal Matura. It does offer the International Baccalaureate.

=== United States ===
TASIS is accredited by the New England Association of Schools and Colleges.

=== International ===
TASIS is accredited by the European Council of International Schools. It is not accredited by the Council of International Schools.

== History ==
TASIS was founded in 1956 by M. Crist Fleming. For the first few years the school was operating, it was located in Locarno, then in Lugano-Loreto until the purchase of the 17th-century Villa de Nobili in Montagnola in 1960. The school added a post-graduate program in 1959 and summer programs in 1972. Since its establishment, TASIS has expanded to include schools and summer programs in England, Greece, Cyprus, Italy, France, Spain, and Puerto Rico.

The school is owned by the TASIS Foundation, a non-profit organization.

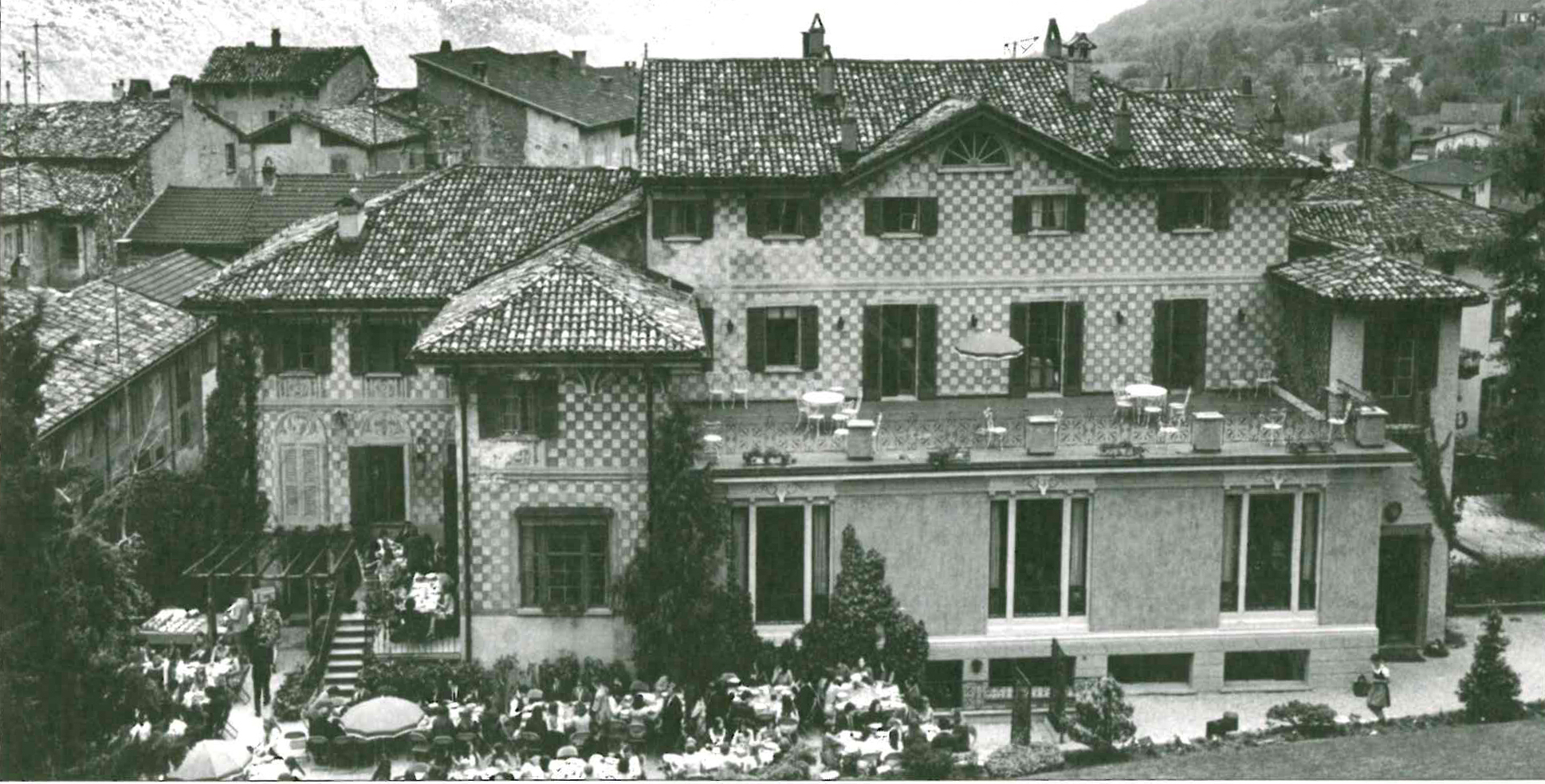
Villa De Nobili, 1972

== Academics ==
Elementary students follow the Core Knowledge Foundation curriculum as well as an Italian Section curriculum. Middle and high school program includes English-as-an-Additional-Language (EAL) content courses, Advanced Placement courses, and the International Baccalaureate program.

Students are required to wear school uniforms.

=== Athletics ===
TASIS offers soccer, volleyball, basketball, swimming, tennis, badminton, track and cross country at the varsity and junior varsity levels. Students travel throughout Switzerland and Europe for tournaments.

TASIS is a member of the Swiss Group of International Schools (SGIS).

== Campus ==
The TASIS campus is located on the Collina d'Oro, overlooking the city of Lugano and Lake Lugano to the North. The most notable campus building is Villa De Nobili, a 17th-century mansion that still contains the suits of armor placed there when the building was owned by Marchese De Nobili, Italian Ambassador to Switzerland. It houses dormitories, classrooms, administrative offices, and the school's dining room. The M. Crist Fleming Library was designed by architect David Mayernik, who received the Palladio award from the Traditional Building (Traditional Homes and Period Homes magazines) for that work. Mayernik also designed the campus of TASIS Portugal and buildings at TASIS England.

== Media coverage ==
Davide Illarietti writing in 2023 for Corriere del Ticino noted the school has "the reputation of the 'school of the oligarchs.'" Illarietti described the scene "after the bell" as security officers escort students to "a parade of mothers" who pick them up in "Mercedes, Bentley's and Ferraris," as looking "like a big time gala,' "

In 2021, Radio Free Europe reported that Leonid Slutsky, a member of Russia's Duma who was sanctioned by the US, had enrolled his daughter at TASIS.

The school has been separately listed by outlets The Independent and SCMP as one of the most expensive both in Switzerland and the world based on its boarding fees.

== Notable alumni ==
- Francys Arsentiev, American mountain climber
- Jeanie Cunningham, American performer, composer, songwriter, producer, writer
- Francesca Gregorini, Italian-American film director and writer
- Victor Kraatz, Canadian ice dancer
- Jennifer Missoni, Italian actress
- Jack Savoretti, Italian-English singer
- Matthew Shepard, American anti-LGBT hate-crime and murder victim
- Isaac Tigrett, co-founder of Hard Rock Café and House of Blues
- Laura Wasser, American attorney
- Billy Zane, American actor and producer

== See also ==
- TASIS Schools
- TASIS England
- TASIS Portugal
- TASIS Dorado
