= Thorpe, Surrey =

Village and parish in Surrey, England

Coordinates: 51°24′25″N 0°32′07″W

Thorpe
- Village
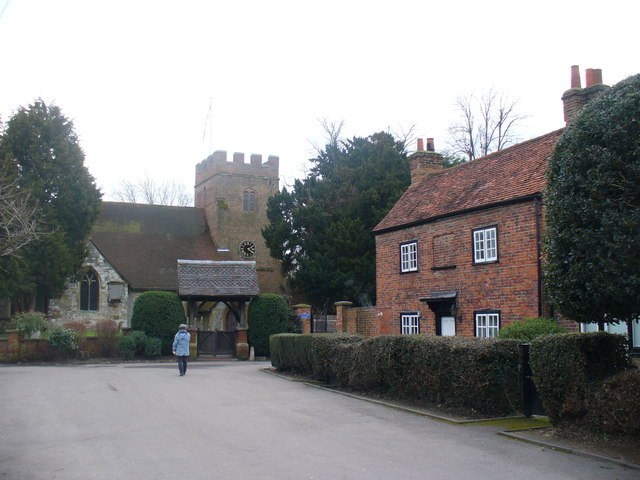
- St Mary's Church at the end of Church Approach

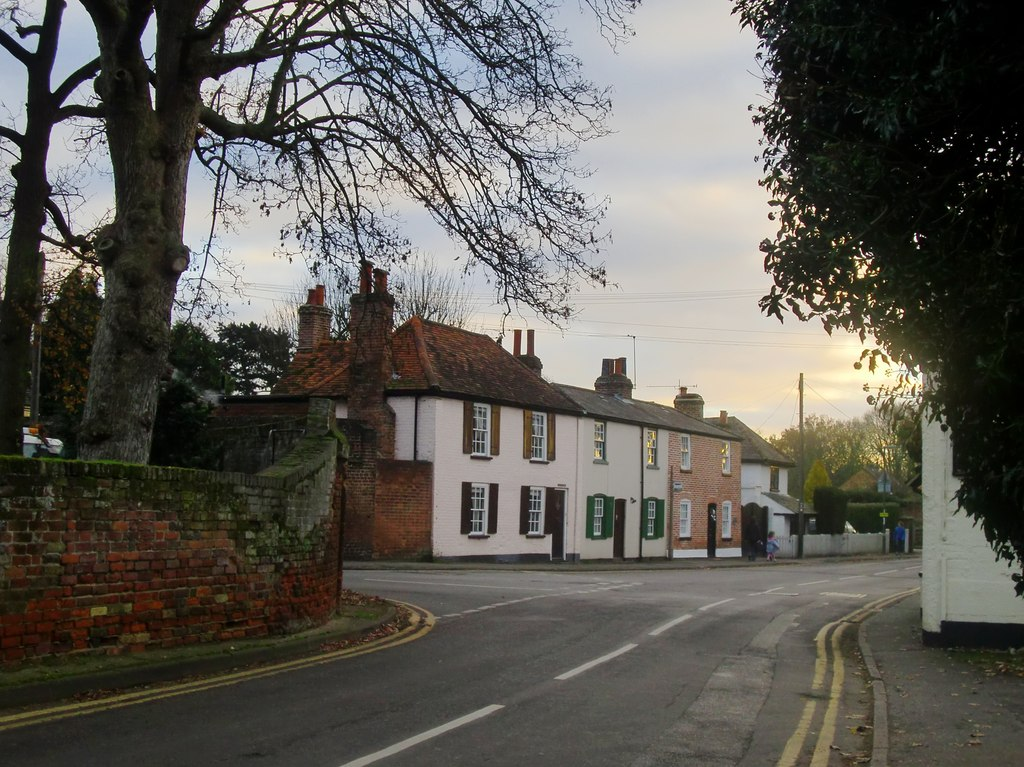
- Cottages in the village

- Location within Surrey
- Population: 5,465 (2011 Census. Ward)
- OS grid reference: TQ019685
- District: Runnymede
- Shire county: Surrey
- Region: South East
- Country: England
- Sovereign state: United Kingdom
- Post town: Egham
- Postcode district: TW20
- Dialling code: 01932
- Police: Surrey
- Fire: Surrey
- Ambulance: South East Coast
- UK Parliament: Runnymede and Weybridge

Thorpe is a village in northwest Surrey, England, around 20 miles (32 km) west of central London. It is in the Borough of Runnymede, between Egham, Virginia Water and Chertsey. It is adjacent to the M25, near the M3 — its ward covers 856 hectares (3.3 mi^{2}). Its traditional area with natural boundaries covers one square mile less. Thorpe is a former civil parish.

Thorpe has been a manor since at least 1066 and has had a Christian place of worship since at least the 7th century. It has never had major industry and relies for much of its amenities on its two main adjoining towns.

The River Bourne or Chertsey Bourne flows through its far south. In the south-east of the ward is Thorpe Park, one of England's largest amusement parks, alongside a separate watersports centre. Its second-tier local authority, Runnymede, is a largely suburban area.

== Geography ==
=== Land use ===
Thorpe is buffered by fields, lakes and woods to all sides (apart from its linear neighbourhood of Thorpe Green) leading to Virginia Water railway station. A very short frontage is provided in terms of borders, to the River Thames to the east, in favour of frontage of outskirts of the larger towns of Chertsey and Egham which border Thorpe to the south and north. Its former rural community partly remains following the construction of nearby motorways and gravel pit extraction. In particular buildings pre-dating 1850 form much of the core of the village centre which is a conservation area. Given the railway line and M25 in the far west of Thorpe, and the M3 to the south, much land use is designated road or buffer, and a considerable amount is taken up by one of the largest theme parks in England, Thorpe Park. A separate watersports centre and one of its five main lakes can be accessed from boat landing stages from the village centre directly.

=== Elevations and soil ===
Elevations are modest but not flat, ranging between 14 and 20m Ordnance Datum as much of the area lies on thin alluvium overlying gravel beds laid over millennia by the River Thames which adjoins the traditional parish to the east.

This range of elevations is greater than central Chertsey but smaller than Egham (in particular to its two upper neighbourhoods or localities of Stroude and Egham Hill). A public road in the south of Thorpe has a wooded backdrop being at the foot of St Ann's Hill marking a north-western boundary of Chertsey.

== Localities ==
=== Thorpe Green ===
Thorpe Green is a relatively sparsely populated, almost rural neighbourhood that has a substantial recreation area and public house to one side of its sole developed road and private housing to the other.

=== Thorpe Lea ===
Thorpe Lea can be considered the southern suburb of Egham. It is contiguous with Egham and the inland part of Egham Hythe with many interconnecting streets on northern sides, the separation being a major seasonal fresh water drainage stream, mainly engineered in the late medieval period from a more sinuous parish boundary. Its housing stock was largely built shortly after the coming of railway in the mid-Victorian period at nearby Egham railway station.

== History ==
Archeological finds in the surrounds point to Bronze and Iron Age as well as Roman settlements. Chertsey Abbey records note a place of worship at Thorpe from the 7th century (seemingly on the same site); the chancel of the parish church was constructed as a chapel of retreat for the private use of Chertsey's Abbot and stands on Roman and pre-Roman foundations. The nave of the present church dates from the 10th century; millennium celebrations at St. Mary's took place in 1990. Accordingly, Thorpe lay in the Godley hundred, so-named for the national religious prominence of this abbey, and percentage of dues payable to it. Sizeable portions of the land of Godley hundred belonged to the medieval Roman Catholic church before the dissolution of the monasteries.

Thorpe Inclosure Act 1807
- Act of Parliament
- Parliament of the United Kingdom
- Long title: An Act for inclosing the Lands of Thorpe in the County of Surrey.
- Citation: 47 Geo. 3 Sess. 2. c. lxiii

Dates
- Royal assent: 1 August 1807

Thorpe appears in Domesday Book of 1086 as Torp. It was held by Chertsey Abbey. Its domesday assets were: seven hides. It had nine ploughlandss compared to 33 of meadow, herbage (typically woodland) worth 24 hogs. It rendered £12 per year. Until the Thorpe Inclosure Act 1807 (47 Geo. 3 Sess. 2. c. lxiii) 'privatised' them here, approximately half of the parish lay in common fields.

In 1951 the parish had a population of 2,449. On 1 April 1974 the parish was abolished.

From the church a path, the 'Monks Walk', runs to the Chertsey abbey (since ruined).

Manor

Having just parted from control of the abbey by a voluntary lease of 30 years in 1509, after approximately five centuries, Chertsey abbey lost the manor for good in 1537 when the abbot surrendered all of his lands to Henry VIII. From 1610, the family of Sir Francis Leigh (later Lord Chichester) owned the very large manor and the neighbouring later manor in the parish, Hall Place, with the exception of a period of 99 years when it saw a complex series of transactions which saw it profit instead Sir Francis Bacon, William Minterne and George Evelyn. Sir John Leigh's two heirs were his female cousins, Ann and Mary (who had the surname Leigh-Bennett). Her male issue went on to inherit the manor. Incidentally in her time as lady of the manor also the two estates were held by them jointly until the passing of an Act of Parliament, 7 Geo. 3. c. 7, by which the legal partition was effected.

In 1870–72, John Marius Wilson's Imperial Gazetteer of England and Wales said Thorpe was 1,495 acres (605 hectares (2.3 mi^{2})) in which lived 552 people in 110 houses. Its real property (housing and businesses) were valued at £3,901 for taxation purposes and Thorpe Lee, Thorpe House, Thorpe Place, and Eastly End were the main houses. It had a National school.

=== Hovels ===
A Local Government Board of inquiry held in 1910 found that many families in Thorpe were living in crowded, unsanitary cottages. One hundred people – one-fifth of the population of Thorpe – were living in just 14 cottages, none of which had more than two bedrooms. Water was obtained from wells, analysis showed that none of this water was of good quality; in one case the water was 'the colour of yellow ochre'. Tenants were reluctant to have their cottages inspected in case repairs were undertaken and their rent increased from the average of 4 shillings per week. In 1909 the overall mortality rate in Thorpe was 16 per 1,000 and infant mortality was 235 per 1,000. Infant mortality was twice the mean for England and Wales of 121 per 1,000.

=== Landmarks ===
The village has 28 listed buildings (excluding any local listing) constructed using the materials and styles of the area.

St Mary's Church

St Mary's Church at Grade II* is part of the conservation area along with a number of other listed buildings locally and nationally dating from the 17th century onwards. Renalds Herne, an 18th-century, brick-built house, stands almost opposite the parish church facing a picturesque close with a thatched cottage and adjacent to another 18th-century brick-built house with a brick-filled window.

Thorpe House

This is the second of three buildings in the Grade II* category and is the only listed building on the north side of the main east–west road leading past the church. It is an ornate building chiefly of the 18th century (partly earlier and later). Thorpe House has walls made of stock brickwork with red brick dressings, an entablature front. Inside are moulded door architraves, many ornate features such as dado rails, marble and cast iron interiors.

The Cottage

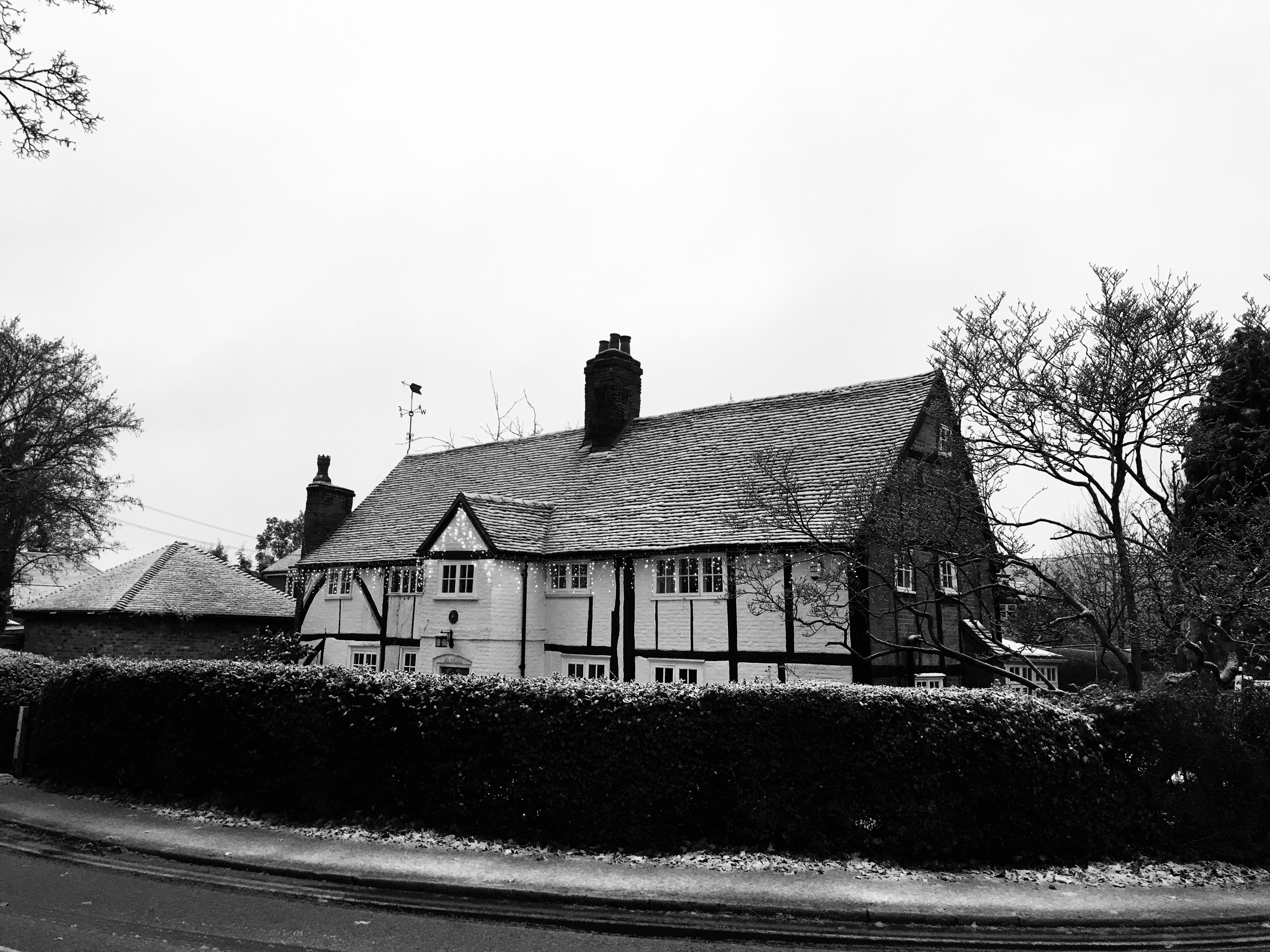
The Cottage - the oldest house in Thorpe.

This is the last of the three buildings in the Grade II* category and is 16th-century with 18th-century additions. Mostly of brick, it has a double timber post and is white-painted with black beams.

==== Grade II listed buildings ====
The Grade II listed buildings and structures in Thorpe are listed alphabetically in the table, together with the Historic England List Entry Number.

Grade II listed buildings and structures in Thorpe
Property or structure	Century originally built	Year listed	List entry No.
Blackhouse Farm Cottages Church Approach	18	1986	1378047
Blossom Cottage Village Road	18	1986	1378050
Brick Wall on the east side Village Road	18	1986	1028937
Chimneys Rosemary Lane	16	1986	1293918
Church Approach No. 1	Medieval	1982	1189236
Church Approach 1 and 2	Medieval	1982	1028927
Church of St Mary (Gates) Coldharbour Lane	18	1951	1190088
Church of St Mary Chapel to north west Coldharbour Lane	20	1986	1028933
Church of St Mary Stable Block Coldharbour Lane	16	1976	1028932
Curlhawes Village Road	16, 17	1986	1190208
Eastley End House Coldharbour Lane	18, 19	1985	1028928
Eastley End Cottage Norlands Lane	16, 18	1951	1190150
Fleetmere Norlands Lane	17	1986	1378049
Goose Green House Clockhouse Lane	17	1986	1294002
Hazlewood Rosemary Lane	18	1986	1190185
Homestead Cottage Clockhouse Lane	17	1976	1190019
Little Timbers Village Road	16	1974	1378070
Manorhouse farm barn Coldharbour Lane	17	1986	1190146
Manorhouse farmhouse Coldharbour Lane	18	1986	1028934
Morley House Village Road	18	1986	1028900
Orchard Cottage Rosemary Lane	16	1986	1028936
Renalds Herne and front wall and railings Coldharbour Lane	18	1986	1190028
Renalds Herne Cottage at rear Coldharbour Lane	17	1986	1028930
Rose and Crown Public House Green Road	17, 19	1951	1028935
Sheila Cottage Village Road	19	1986	1028938
Thatched Cottage Church Approach	17	1986	1378048
The Lodge Church Approach	18	1951	1293997
The Old Post Office Village Road	18	1986	1190205
Farmhouse Village Road	17	1986	1028939
Wall on north side Coldharbour Lane	17	1985	1028929
Wall on south side Coldharbour Lane	–	1985	1294011
Walnut Tree Cottage Village Road	18	1986	1293932
West End Farm Rosemary Lane	16	1975	1028957

=== Population ===
Population of the parish of Thorpe from 1801 to 2019

Year	Pop.	±%
1801	485	—
1811	523	+7.8%
1821	509	−2.7%
1831	471	−7.5%
1841	532	+13.0%
1851	555	+4.3%
1861	552	−0.5%
1871	590	+6.9%
1881	610	+3.4%
1891	549	−10.0%
1901	508	−7.5%

Year	Pop.	±%
1911	590	+16.1%
1921	771	+30.7%
1931	1,280	+66.0%
1951	2,449	+91.3%
1971	3,612	+47.5%
1981	4,845	+34.1%
1991	4,932	+1.8%
2001	5,806	+17.7%
2011	5,465	−5.9%
2019	5,883	+7.6%

NB No data for 1961.

== Economy ==
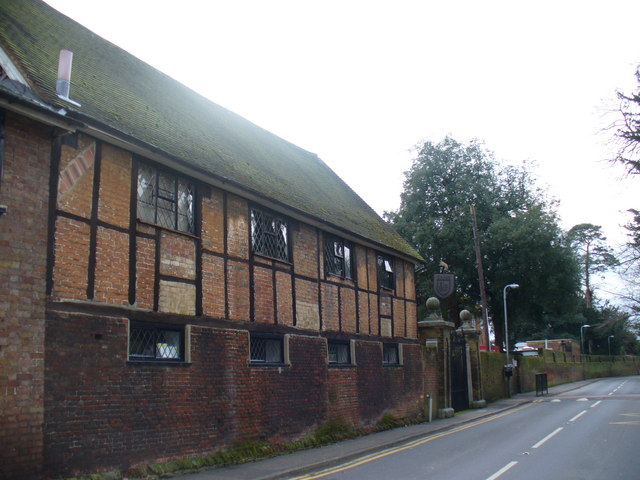
Building in Thorpe used by TASIS England

Official statistics of the 2011 Census reveal that the most significant sectors of employment were Transport & Storage, and Education with 12% and 11% of the workforce respectively. Reflecting national statistics of suburban areas, 0.4% of the population worked in agriculture, forestry, fishing, mining or quarrying. Across the less precise range of wide occupation categories, each had a considerable percentage of Thorpe employees; professional occupations was foremost among these, slightly higher than the next highest category, associate professional and technical occupations, followed by director or senior official level occupations.

The village's most important landowner is Thorpe Park Resort, a theme park which is also a significant employer of the local population. Junctions of motorways providing fast links to London Heathrow airport are accessible in the outskirts of the two adjoining towns. The American School in Switzerland, The American School In England and golf resorts such as Wentworth provide other sources of employment; landscaping being significant in neighbouring Virginia Water and the closest part of Berkshire beyond this, which is Sunningdale.

Thorpe Industrial Estate/Business Park adjoining the village centre by Thorpe Park Lakes is home to Maranello Concessionaires, Ferrari's UK distributor.

== Notable people ==
Notable former residents of Thorpe include Frank Muir, David Williams and Admiral Hardy (1769–1839), captain of HMS Victory during the Battle of Trafalgar.

In 1909, H.E. Malden's edition of the Victoria County History described Thorpe as "picturesque and consists of a group of houses at the cross-roads, with others scattered along a winding road to the east." This volume noted the following homes and owners:

- Thorpe Place: Mr. Henry Currie Leigh-Bennett. (M.P. for Chertsey district 1897–1903) Site of the old manor house.
- Thorpe Lea : Lady Milford (née Lady Anne Jane Howard)
- Thorpe House: Mr. W. C. Scott (for building details see above)
- The Grange: Mr. E. H. Holden

== Gallery ==
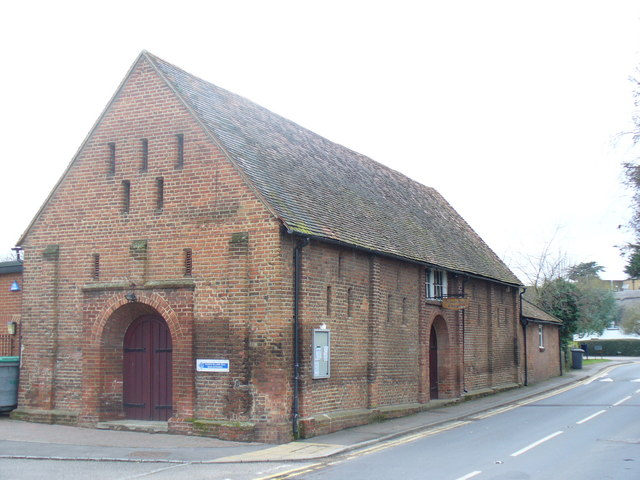
Thorpe Village Hall, built in the 17th century as a barn. Grade II listed building since 1951.

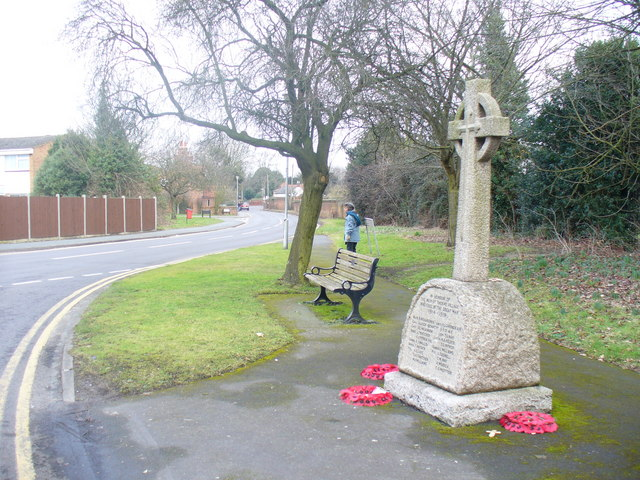
Thorpe War Memorial, on the corner of Village Road and Mill Lane.

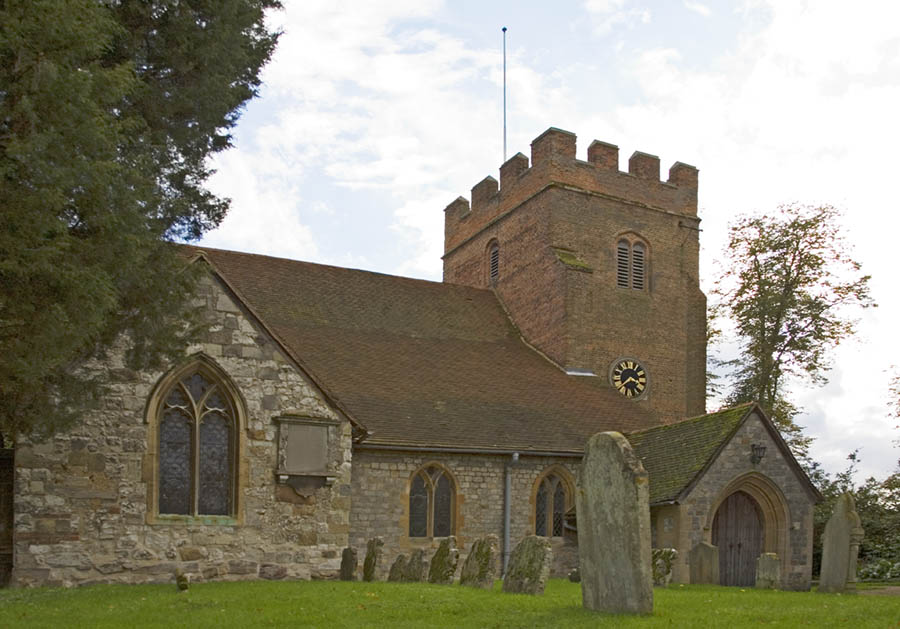
St Mary's Church. Earliest parts 7th-century with brick-built crenellated tower from the early 16th century, restoration in 1893

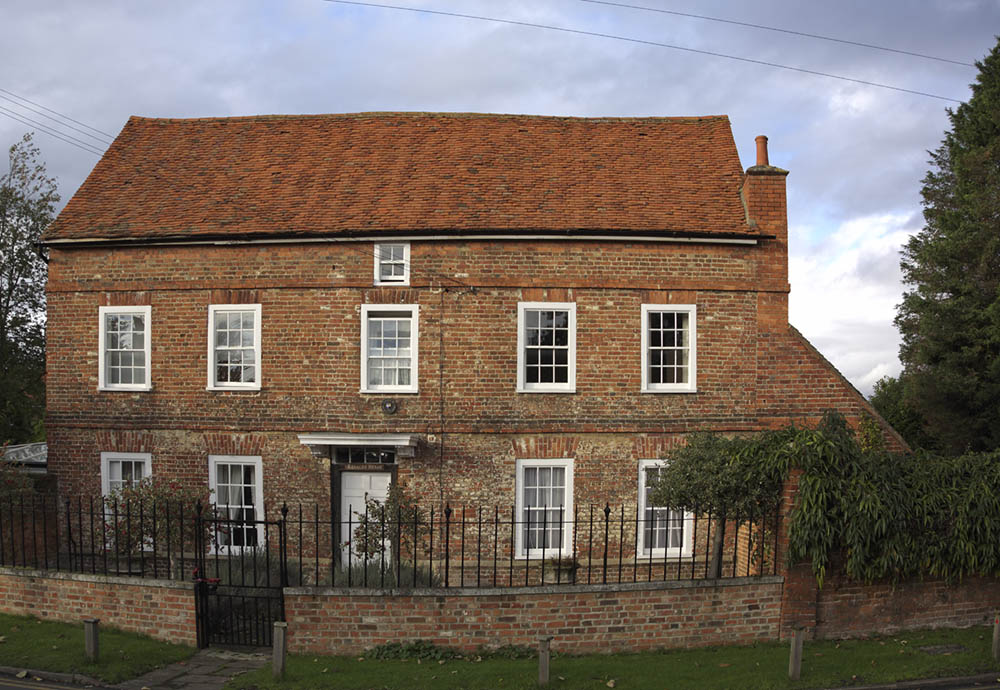
Renalds Herne, an 18th-century, brick-built house constructed of local materials to traditional local design

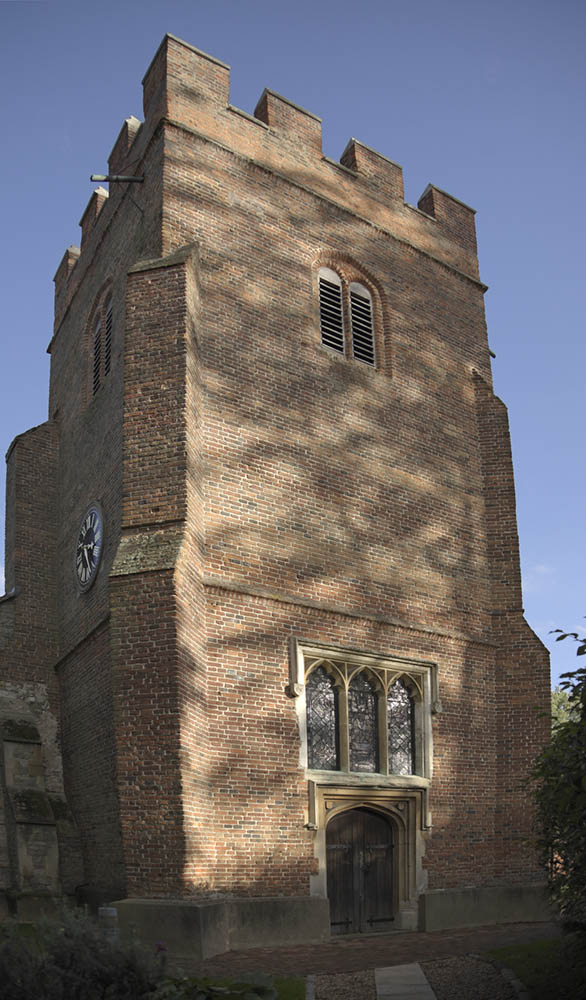
St Mary's brick-built, early 16th-century tower (with later crenellation), diagonal buttresses and square-headed three pane window above wooden door

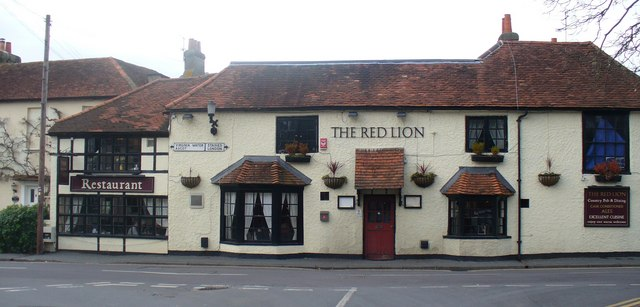
The Red Lion Pub on Village Road. There has been a pub on this site since about 1700.
