= Quinta da Beloura =

- Gated community and Golf resort
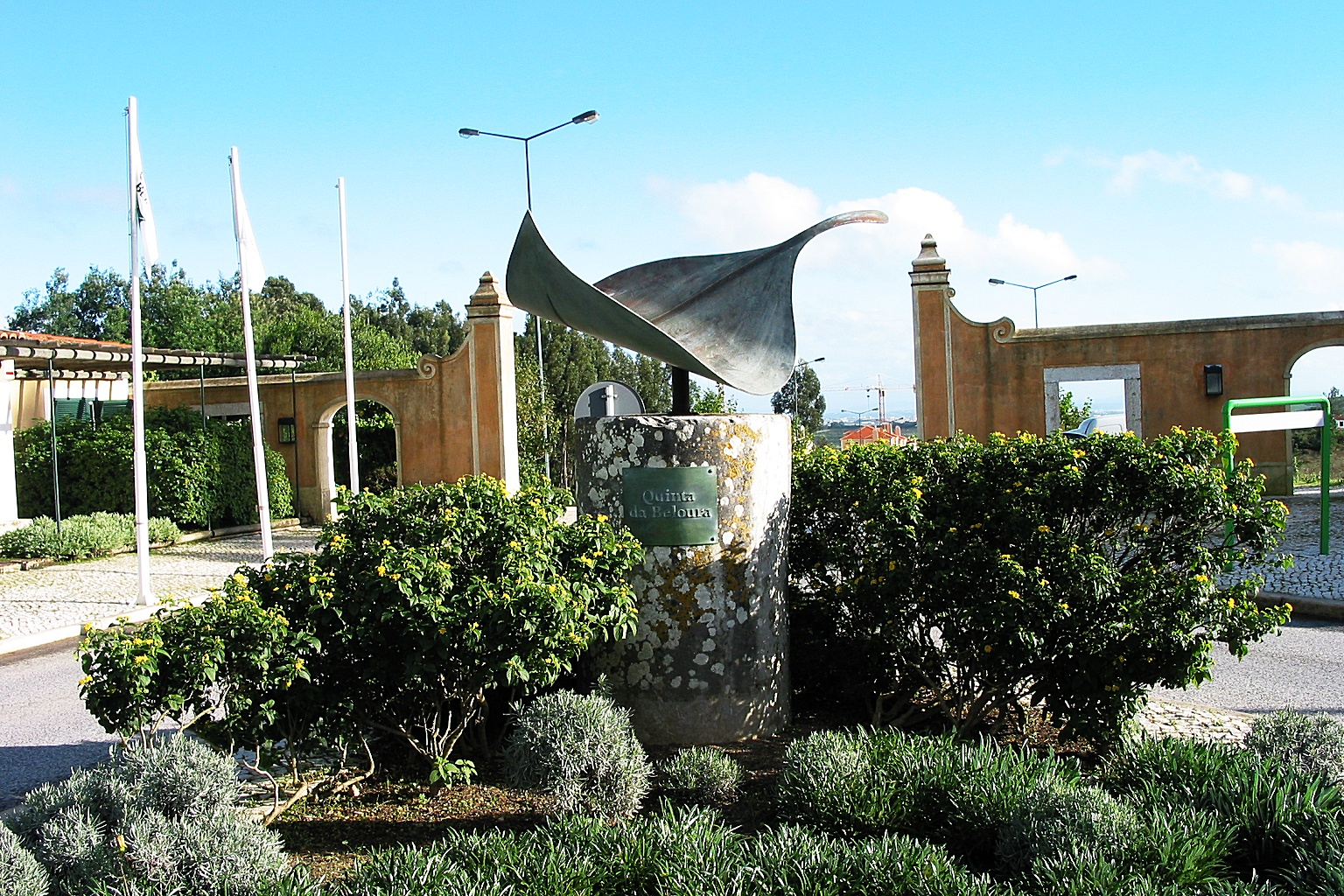
- Interactive map of Quinta da Beloura
- Country: Portugal
- District: Lisbon District
- Region: Portuguese Riviera
- Municipality: Sintra
- Website: www.quintadabeloura.pt

Quinta da Beloura is an affluent gated community and golf resort located in Linhó, Sintra, on the Portuguese Riviera. The community is known for hosting numerous golf tournaments, tennis opens, and equestrian & dressage events, as well as for being the home of numerous famous personalities.

== History ==
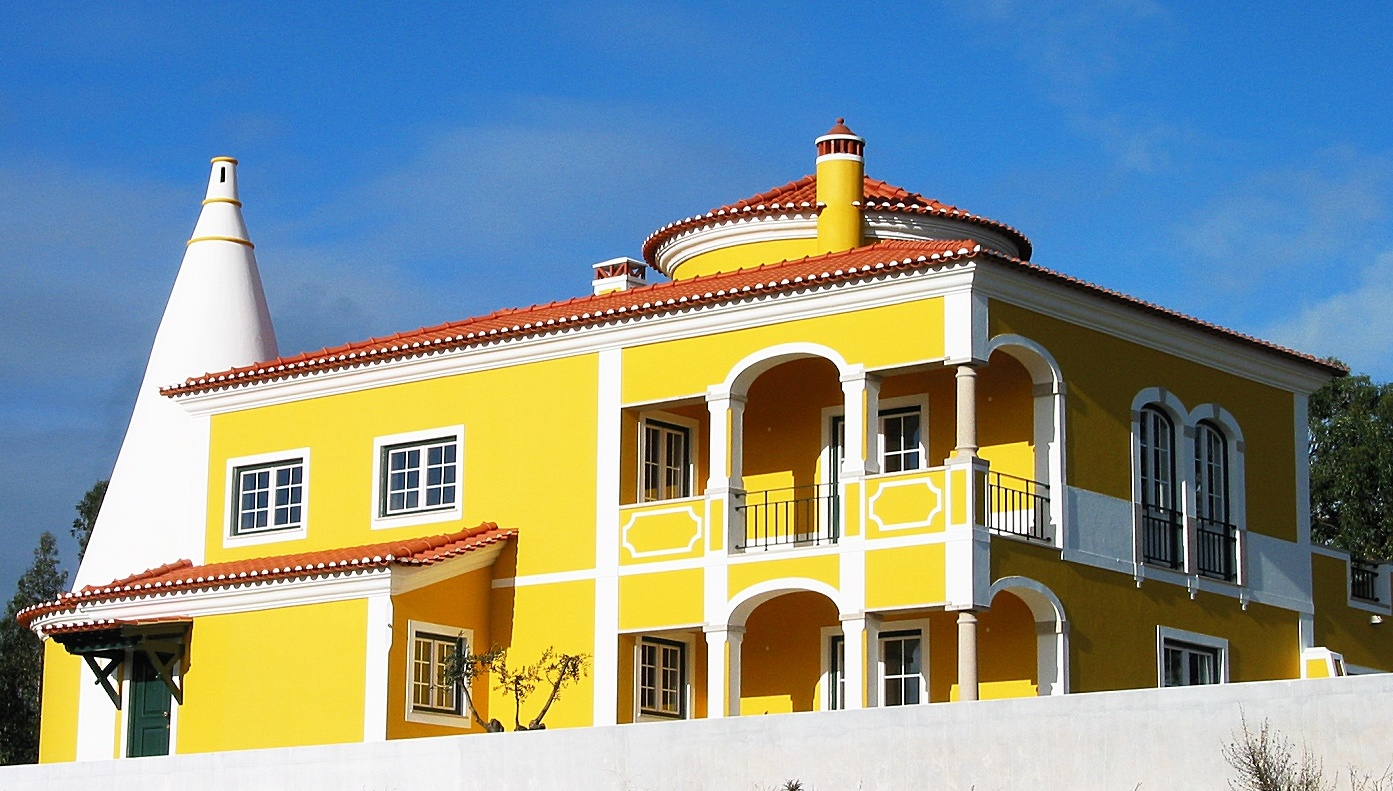
A traditional Portuguese villa in Quinta da Beloura.

Quinta da Beloura was founded as a luxury planned community in the Sintra Mountains, the traditional summer domain of the Portuguese nobility.

=== Resort ===
Quinta da Beloura is home to the Pestana Beloura Golf Resort, part of the Pestana Group, a Portuguese luxury hotel group.

=== Golf ===
Quinta da Beloura
- Interactive map of Quinta da Beloura

Club information
- Location: Sintra, Portuguese Riviera
- Established: 1993
- Type: Private
- Total holes: 18
- Designed by: William Roquemore
- Par: 72

Quinta da Beloura's golf courses were designed by award-winning American golf architect Rocky Roquemore, who also designed the courses at Quinta do Lago and Vale do Lobo in the Algarve.

Beloura holds the Portuguese Golf Federation's annual National Seniors Championship.

=== Tennis ===
Beloura Tennis Academy (BTA) has hosted the Portuguese Tennis Federation's prestigious Campeonato Nacional Absoluto (National Absolute Championship) in 2017. BTA is known for hosting the annual Beloura Junior Open, a European qualifying tournament.

Since 2017, Beloura annually hosts the BTA Futures, part of the International Tennis Federation's Men's Circuit.

=== Equestrian ===
The Quinta da Beloura Equestrian Center (Portuguese: Centro Hípico Quinta da Beloura) holds numerous equestrian events including the Portuguese Equestrian Federation's 2015 Taça de Portugal (Portuguese Cup Championship). The Beloura team won this event in 2004.

The community hosted the 2017 and 2018 Troféu de Dressage em Póneis (English: Pony Dressage Trophy), an annual dressage competition held between equestrian academies of the Portuguese Riviera.

Beloura hosted the 2017 Portuguese National Horseball Championship.

== Notable residents ==
- Cristiano Ronaldo, Portuguese footballer
- José Sócrates, former Prime Minister of Portugal
- Shahal M. Khan, American owner of the Plaza Hotel in New York City
- Dânia Neto, Portuguese supermodel
- Carlos Xavier, Portuguese footballer for Sporting Lisbon
- Bruno Vale, Portuguese footballer for FC Porto
- Miguel Gameiro, Portuguese lead vocalist of Pólo Norte
- Marta Aragão Pinto, Portuguese actress
