= TASIS Portugal =

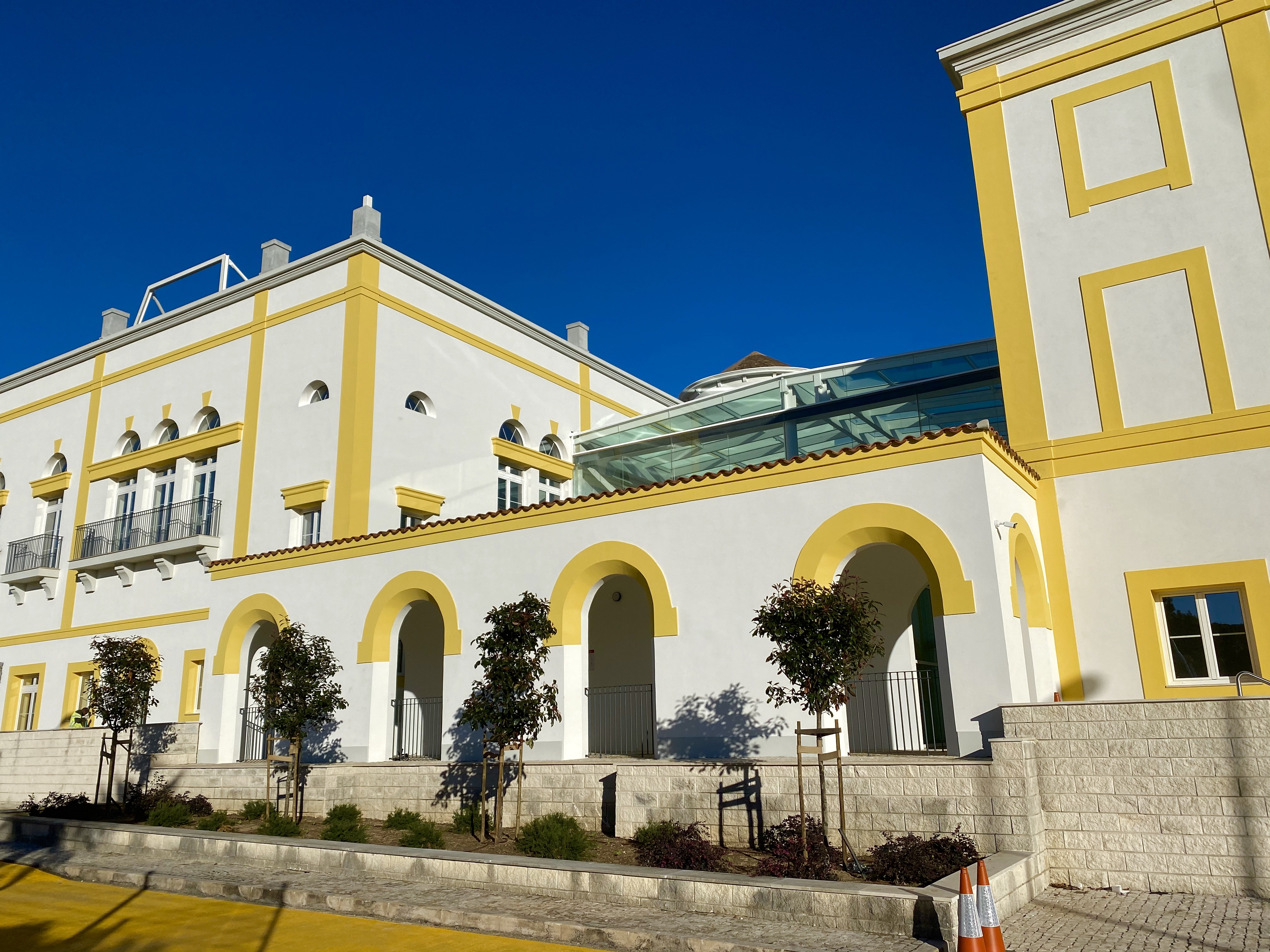

Location
- Linhó, Sintra, Lisbon District, 2710-697; Portugal; 38.7594°N 9.3866°W

Information
- School type: American international school
- Founded: 2020
- Sister school: TASIS Schools
- Headmaster: Dennis Manning
- Grades: Pre-K — 12
- Colours: Blue and red
- Website: Official website

TASIS Portugal, formally known as The American School in Portugal, is a private American international school in Portugal. Established in 2020, it is part of the TASIS Schools, a network of four international schools associated with the TASIS Foundation.

Located in Linhó, Sintra, on the Portuguese Riviera, and serves an international student population.

== History ==
TASIS Portugal was established in 2020 as the fourth school in the TASIS Schools, whose origins date to the founding of The American School in Switzerland by M. Crist Fleming in 1956.

Its campus was founded within the Quinta da Beloura in Linhó, Sintra, on the Portuguese Riviera, west of Lisbon on the site of the former Beloura Shopping Center. It was designed by architect and artist David Mayernik, who previously won the Palladio award from the Traditional Building Conference for his design at TASIS Switzerland. The complex has been progressively adapted and expanded for educational use. Facilities include classrooms, science laboratories, libraries, performing arts spaces, theaters, and indoor and outdoor athletic facilities.

The school became an authorized International Baccalaureate World School on June 20, 2024. Its first graduating class completed Grade 12 in 2026.

== Academics ==
TASIS Portugal is organized into four divisions: Pre-Kindergarten, Elementary School (Kindergarten–Grade 5), Middle School (Grades 6–8), and High School (Grades 9–12).

The school follows the Core Knowledge Foundation curriculum from Pre-Kindergarten through Grade 8, incorporating Singapore Math in elementary and middle school.

High school students follow the Cambridge International General Certificate of Secondary Education (IGCSE) curriculum in Grades 9 and 10, followed by the International Baccalaureate Diploma Programme (IBDP) in Grades 11 and 12.

The school has received Core Knowledge School of Distinction recognition.

=== Academic Results ===
TASIS Portugal's first graduating class, in 2026, achieved an average International Baccalaureate Diploma score of 34.8 points, with a reported diploma pass rate of 98%.

=== Student Life ===
TASIS Portugal offers extracurricular activities in athletics, music, visual and performing arts, public speaking, and student leadership. Activities include Model United Nations, speech and debate, student government, robotics, and the Duke of Edinburgh's Award program.

All students are required to wear school uniforms.

== Administration ==
TASIS Portugal operates within the TASIS Schools network under the TASIS Foundation, a Swiss-based nonprofit organization. The school maintains its own governing board, chaired by Fernando González.

Keith Chicquen served as the school's founding headmaster until the end of the 2025–26 academic year. Dennis Manning was appointed interim headmaster for the 2026–27 academic year.

== Recognition and accreditation ==
TASIS Portugal is authorized by the Portuguese Ministry of Education, through the Directorate-General for Education (Direção-Geral da Educação, DGE). Its academic programs are recognized within the Portuguese education system, with established equivalencies allowing students to transfer between TASIS Portugal and Portuguese schools.

The school is an authorized International Baccalaureate (IB) World School, having received authorization to offer the IB Diploma Programme on June 20, 2024. It is also recognized as a Cambridge International School and a Core Knowledge School of Distinction.

TASIS Portugal is a member of the Council of International Schools (CIS) and is pursuing joint institutional accreditation through CIS and the New England Association of Schools and Colleges (NEASC).

In the 2024–25 academic year, TASIS Portugal established an agreement with the Centre for Evaluation and Certification of Portuguese as a Foreign Language (Centro de Avaliação e Certificação de Português Língua Estrangeira, CAPLE), affiliated with the Faculty of Arts and Humanities of the University of Lisbon. The school serves as an official examination center for Portuguese as a Foreign Language certification.

For university admissions, TASIS Portugal is registered with the College Board and with the United Kingdom's Universities and Colleges Admissions Service (UCAS).
