= Rocky Roquemore =

American golf course architect (born 1948)

William A. "Rocky" Roquemore (born August 10, 1948), is an American golf course architect and designer, with international courses in Portugal, Scotland, France, Venezuela, Columbia and the Caribbean, as well as the across the US. He was owner and operator of Canongate Golf Clubs, a set of private golf courses in the Atlanta area, which were subsequently sold to Sequoia Golf LLC. and later ClubCorp.

== Early life ==
Roquemore grew up in Lakeland, Georgia. He graduated from Lanier County High School in 1966. He was hired in 1969 as an associate of Joe Lee. Roquemore's first assignment under Lee, was onsite supervisor for the construction of the first three golf courses at Walt Disney World. In 1974 Lee Made him a partner in the firm. During the partnership, the two designed and renovated over 100 golf courses. Two of those were chosen as best new course by Golf Digest Magazine, and several other were in the top ten.

== Canongate Golf Clubs ==
His great-grandfather Robert L. Patten founded Patten Seed Company in 1901. In the 1950s, the company became the first commercial producer of turf quality hybrid Bermuda grasses whose first users were golf courses in the Deep South. Bill Roquemore, Rocky' father, changed the name of the Patten Seed Co. to Canongate Golf Clubs, a name people would associate better with the golf business.

=== List of Courses Designed ===
The Roquemore family together had designed and built over 174 courses across the world, and has owned and operated about 23 of them. In addition to courses in International locations include: Portugal,

== Awards and Accomplishments ==
The Roquemores were chosen by the National Golf Foundation as the Jack Nicklaus Golf Family of the year in 1995, and Patten Seed Company, the in 2005.
