= Palladio Award =

Architectural prize

The Palladio Award is an architectural prize given annually for "creative interpretation or adaptation of design principles developed through 2,500 years of the Western architectural tradition". The Awards, in several categories, are presented by the Traditional Building Magazine, Period Homes Magazine, and the Traditional Building Conference.

The Palladio is a "coveted" architectural prize given for excellence in traditional design. It is the only national award in the United States given for excellence in classical design.

== Recipients (alphabetically by year) ==
| 2002 | 2003 | 2004 | 2005 | 2006 |
|---|---|---|---|---|
| CBT/Childs Bertman Tseckares, Einhorn Yaffee Prescott Frazier Associates, G. P. Schafer Architect, PLLC, Historical Concepts, Schooley Caldwell Associates, Wesketch Architecture | Bowie Gridley Architects, Ronald F. DiMauro Architects, Inc., Frens and Frens, LLC, David Jones Architects, FFKR Architects, Barnes Vanze Architects, Peter Zimmerman Architect | Bushman Dreyfus Architects PLC, Historical Concepts, LLC, Geoffrey Mouen Architects, Joseph K. Oppermann - Architect, P.A., G.P. Schafer Architect, Robert A.M. Stern Architects, Eric Watson Architect, P.A., Peter Zimmerman Architects | Archer & Buchanan Architecture, Ltd., BKSK Architects, Schooley Caldwell Associates, Cooper Johnson Smith Architects, Inc., Einhorn Yaffee Prescott Architecture & Engineering, Albert, Righter & Tittmann Architects, Inc., Barnes Vanze Architects, DeWitt Tishmann Architects, David Mayernik Ltd., Robert A.M. Stern Architects, Voith & Mactavish Architects and Victoria Steiger Garden Design | Chael, Cooper & Associates, David Jones Architects, Einhorn Yaffee Prescott Architecture & Engineering P.C., Hartman-Cox Architects, Historical Concepts, Isthmus Architecture, Inc., National Monuments Foundation, Urban Design Associates, Peter Zimmerman Architects |
| 2007 | 2008 | 2009 | 2010 | 2011 |
| Archer & Buchanan Architecture, Ltd., BKSK Architects LLC, Christine G.H. Franck, Inc., Commonwealth Architects, Hartman-Cox Architects, Hanbury Evans Wright Vlattas + Company, Albert, Righter & Tittmann Architects, John Simpson & Partners, Shepley Bulfinch Richardson & Abbott, Zivkovic Associates Architects | Pier Carlo Bontempi Architettura Civile & Disegno Urbano, De la Guardia Victoria Architects & Urbanists, Inc., David Jones Architects, Ferguson & Shamamian Architects, LLP, RMJM Hillier, Khoury & Vogt Architects, Neumann Lewis Buchanan Architects, Andrea Pacciani Architect, Wadia Associates, White & Borgognoni Architects | James Doyle Design Associates, LLC, Rill & Decker Architects, PC, Gardiner Larson Homes, Khoury & Vogt Architects, John B. Murray Architect, LLC, Capitol Restoration Group, Fairfax & Sammons Architects, PC, G. P. Schafer Architect, PLLC, Tsoi/Kobus & Associates, Inc., Urban Design Associates, Ltd., Voith & Mactavish Architects LLP | Richard Anderson Landscape Architect, Atkin Olshin Schade Architects, Braulio Casas Architects, P.A., Ferguson & Shamamian Architects, LLP, Michael G. Imber, Architects, James Merrell Architects, P.C., David Scott Parker Architects, LLC, Khoury & Vogt Architects, John G. Waite Associates, Architects, PLLC, Robert A. M. Stern Architects, LLP, Roman and Williams Buildings and Interiors | James Doyle Design Associates, Glavé & Holmes Architecture, Grandberg & Associates Architects, Michael G. Imber Architects, Glenn Keyes Architects, John Milner Architects, Hilton-VanderHorn Architects, Sachs & Lindores, Duncan G. Stroik Architect |
| 2012 | 2013 | 2014 | 2015 | 2016 |
| Architectural Resource, HBRA Architects, Don B. McDonald Architect, John Milner Architects, Janice Parker Landscape Design, J. Lawton Thies Architects, John G. Waite Associates, Robert A.M. Stern Architects, Treanor Architects | Doyle Herman Design Associates, David Jones Architects, Michael G. Imber Architects, Neumann Lewis Buchanan Architects, Peter Zimmerman Architects, Richard M. Economakis Architectural Design, Runberg Architecture Group, Rynerson O’Brien Architecture, Duncan G. Stroik Architect, Paul Duchscherer | Archer & Buchanan Architecture, Michael Burch Architects, Virginia Burt Designs, Curtis & Windham Architects, Duncan G. Stroik Architect, LLC, John B. Murray Architect, Tsoi/Kobus & Associates, Voith & Mactavish Architects, LLP | BKSK Architects, Curtis & Windham Architects Inc., David Scott Parker Architects, Hamady Architects LLC, Khoury & Vogt Architects, Marcy Wong Donn Logan Architects, Robert A. M. Stern Architects, S/L/A/M Collaborative, Sullivan Buckingham Architects, Treanor Architects, Peter Zimmerman Architects | Architectural Resources Group, Inc., Badger Hill Farm (Neumann Lewis Buchanan Architects), Centerbrook Architects and Planners, Doyle Herman Design Associates, Eric Watson Architect, Fairfax & Sammons Architects, Glavé & Holmes Architecture, HBRA Architects, Inc., Historic Doors, LLC, Kass & Associates, Michael Burch Architects, Neumann Lewis Buchanan Architects, Robert A.M. Stern Architects, Schooley Caldwell Associates, Upper West Side (Fairfax & Sammons Architects) |
| 2017 | 2018 | 2019 | 2020 | 2021 |
| EYP Architects & Engineers, Fairfax & Sammons, Ferguson & Shamamian, Gerner Kronick & Valcarcel Architects, Land Plus Associates, Nequette Architecture Design, O’Brien & Keane, OLSON LEWIS + Architects, PBDW Architects with Herzog + de Meuron, Scott Henson Architect + Stephen B. Jacobs Group, John B. Murray Architect | Anderson Hallas Architects, Beyer Blinder Belle Architects & Planners, Doyle Herman Design Associates, Fairfax & Sammons Architects, Gerner Kronick & Valcarcel Architects, G.P. Schafer Architect, Jeffrey Dungan Architects, John Milner Architects, Michael Burch Architects, Robert A.M. Stern Architects, VanderHorn Architects, Voith & Mactavish Architects | Architectural Resources Group, Doyle Herman Design Associates, Donald B. McDonald, Architect, Harrison Design, HBRA Architects, Jeffrey Dungan Architects, John Canning & Co., LTD, John G. Waite Associates, Architects, PLLC, John Milner Architects, Inc., Jones & Boer Architects, Nequette Architecture & Design, David M. Schwarz Architects, Duncan G. Stroik Architect, Hastings Architecture, Arte 2000 Traditional Cut Stone | The Cooper Group, De la Guardia Victoria Architects & Urbanists, David M. Schwarz Architects, Inc., David Scott Parker Architects, Douglas C. Wright Architects, Fairfax & Sammons Architects, Ferguson & Shamamian Architects, G. P. Schafer Architect, Haver & Skolnick Architects, Janice Parker Landscape Architects, John Canning & Co., McCrery Architects, PLLC, Jones & Boer Architects, John G. Waite Associates, Architects, PLLC | Albert, Righter & Tittmann Architects Inc., Anderson Hallas Architects, PC, B&D Builders LLC, Bories & Shearron Architecture DPC, Charles Hilton Architects, Duncan G. Stroik Architect, Fernando Wong Outdoor Living Design, G. P. Schafer Architect, DPC, Jan Hird Pokorny Associates, Lichten Architects, McMillan Pazdan Smith Architecture, Michael G. Imber, Architects, Robert Orr & Associates, Rosales + Partners, Stantec Architecture, Inc., Trivers, University of Arkansas (Michael G. Imber, Architects) |
| 2022 | 2023 | 2024 | 2025 | 2026 |
| The Architect’s Studio, BELT, Don B. McDonald Architect, AIA, Ltd., Duncan G. Stroik Architect, LLC, EYP, Fair Lane (Heritage Metalworks), Harrison Design, James Doyle Design Associates, John Milner Architects, Inc., Marcy Wong Donn Logan Architects, Moor, Baker & Associates Architects, P.A., Robert A.M. Stern Architects, The S/L/A/M Collaborative, Via Marina | T.S. Adams Studio Architects, Inc., Bories & Shearron Architecture DPC, ESa, Franck & Lohsen Architects, Glavé & Holmes Architecture, Harboe Architects, Hoerr Schaudt, Hull Millwork, LLC, John Milner Architects, Inc., G. P. Schafer Architect, DPC, Robert A.M. Stern Architects, Trivers, Marcy Wong Donn Logan Architects, Peter Zimmerman Architects | Anderson, Chris & Laurie (Garden Iron Collective), Austin Studios, Inc., Craig & Company / Costello Studio, Inc., Dan Gordon Landscape Architects, de la Guardia Victoria Architects & Urbanists, David M. Schwarz Architects, Don B. McDonald Architects, Ekman Design Studio, Fairfax & Sammons Architecture, Ferguson & Shamamian Architects, Hendricks Churchill, Hord Architects, Janice Parker Landscape Architects, O’Brien & Keane, Quinn Evans, R.J. Heisenbottle Architects, P.A., Robert A.M. Stern Architects, 3North | ART Architects, BELT • METAL ART+DESIGN STUDIO, Benjamin Johnston Design, Dan Gordon Landscape Architects, FGS Design, LLC, First Church of Christ – John Canning & Co., Ltd., HBRA Architects Incorporated, Heights Regency, Littlegate, Michael G. Imber Architects, Moody Nolan, Quinn Evans, Robert A.M. Stern Architects, Steven W. Spandle Architect, LLC, Sottile & Sottile | |
