= Cinema Império =

Cinema - Theatre in Lisbon, Portugal (1952 - 1983)

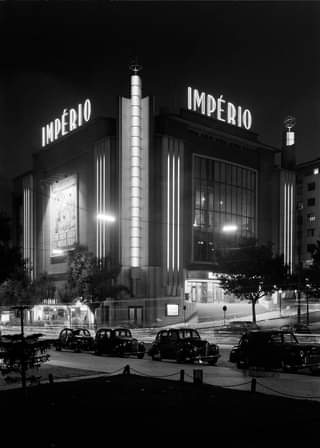
- Interactive map of Cinema Império
- Address: Alameda Dom Afonso Henriques, 35; Lisbon; Portugal
- Coordinates: 38°44′11″N 09°08′03″W
- Capacity: 1,676

Construction
- Opened: May 1952
- Closed: December 1983
- Architect: Cassiano Branco,

Cinema Império (Empire Cinema) was a cinema, theatre, and concert hall in the Portuguese capital of Lisbon that opened on 24 May 1952 and closed in December 1983. Since 1992 it has been used as a place of worship for the Universal Church of the Kingdom of God. Designed by Cassiano Branco, the building is considered one of the major examples of modernist architecture during the period in which Portugal was under the control of the dictatorial Estado Novo regime.

== The building ==
The building is located at the intersection of Alameda Dom Afonso Henriques and Avenida Almirante Reis in the parish of Arroios in central Lisbon. Owned by a consortium including the industrialist Fernando Seixas, the cinema was initially designed by Cassiano Branco, with the work being completed by António Varela, Frederico George, and Raul Ramalho. Interior sculptures were designed by Martins Correia, ceramics by Jorge Barradas and mural painting was by Luís Dourdil. Opened on 24 May 1952, it was considered a classic example of Estado Novo architecture of the 1950s. In 1996, it was classified as a property of public interest by the Direção-Geral do Património Cultural (DGPC) (Directorate-General for Cultural Heritage). The building is now served by the Alameda Metro Station.

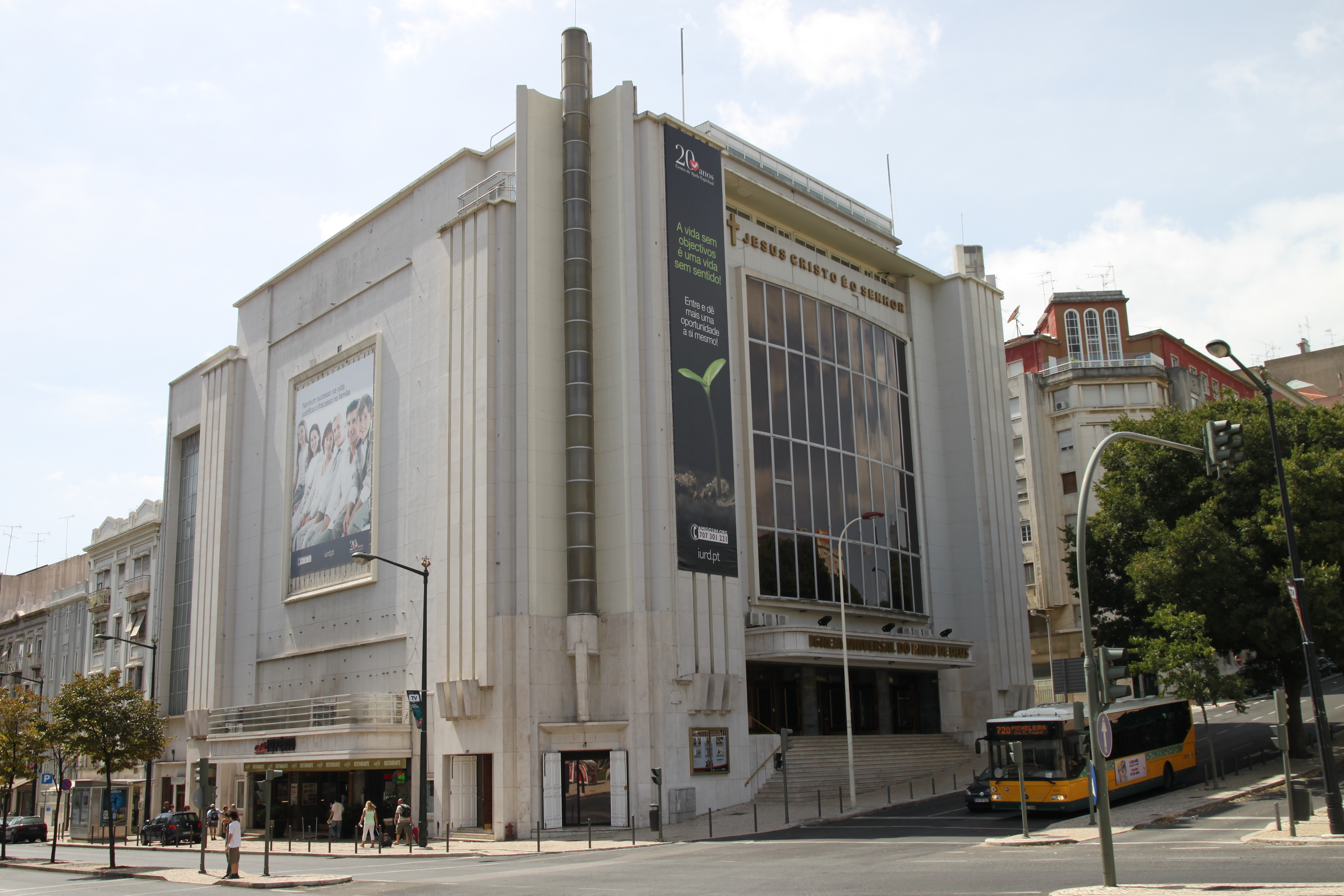
The building after its conversion to a church

== Cinema Império ==
Cinema Império was one of the most prestigious and largest cinemas in Lisbon. It had 1,676 seats in stalls, and two balconies, with a restaurant in the basement with murals by Dourdil. In 1972 a second screen, known as the Studio, was opened on the top floor. The cinema ceased operation at the end of 1983 because of competition from television and the proliferation of multi-screen cinemas in shopping centres.

=== Films ===
The first performance was on 24 May 1952, with a showing of the French film La beauté du diable, directed by René Clair. During its lifetime it screened films by directors such as Ingmar Bergman, Orson Welles and Jean Eustache. Jules et Jim by François Truffaut, The Year of the Cannibals by Liliana Cavani, Juliet of the Spirits and Amarcord by Federico Fellini, Rosemary's Baby by Roman Polanski, and 55 Days at Peking by Nicholas Ray were among the films that proved popular. The Studio screen, on the top floor, showed the more avant-garde films.

=== Music ===
The Império also hosted Portuguese and foreign music shows. International performers included Cliff Richard and The Shadows, France Gall, Quincy Jones, and Count Basie. Portuguese performers included Madalena Iglésias, António Calvário, and Simone de Oliveira. It also hosted the Portuguese Song Festival, together with the Estado Novo's radio station, the Emissora Nacional.

The Império was the location for the Vianna da Motta International Music Competition. The first edition, in 1957, was won by Naum Shtarkman from the Soviet Union, much to the annoyance of the government. After the ministry of education withdrew its support from the event and put pressure on the organisers to hold no further such competitions, the building's co-owner Fernando Seixas was persuaded by the organiser and pianist Sequeira Costa to use his influence with the regime to permit further editions. First prize in the second edition in 1964 was shared by Nelson Freire from Brazil and Vladimir Krainev from the Soviet Union.

=== Theatre ===
Between 1961 and 1965, the Império hosted the Companhia de Teatro Moderno de Lisboa (Lisbon Modern Theater Company) founded by actors such as Carmen Dolores, Rui de Carvalho, and Armando Cortez, who sought to perform shows that they wanted to perform, rather than having to respond to the requirements of impresarios. The company presented plays by writers such as Fyodor Dostoevsky, August Strindberg, John Steinbeck and Georges Feydeau. After a very controversial staging of José Cardoso Pires' play, The Render of Heroes, they were refused permission by the regime's censors to stage Les Cochons d'Inde by Yves Jamiaque. As a result, the company had to close in 1965 after support from the Calouste Gulbenkian Foundation was withdrawn.

== Closure of the Império ==
The building closed its doors as a cinema and theatre on 31 December 1983. In 1992 it was converted into the Portuguese Cathedral of the Universal Church of the Kingdom of God and thus spared demolition, unlike several other buildings from the Estado Novo era.
