= Carlucci American International School of Lisbon =

American school in Portugal

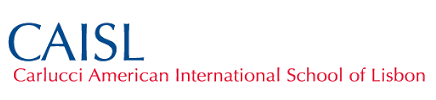

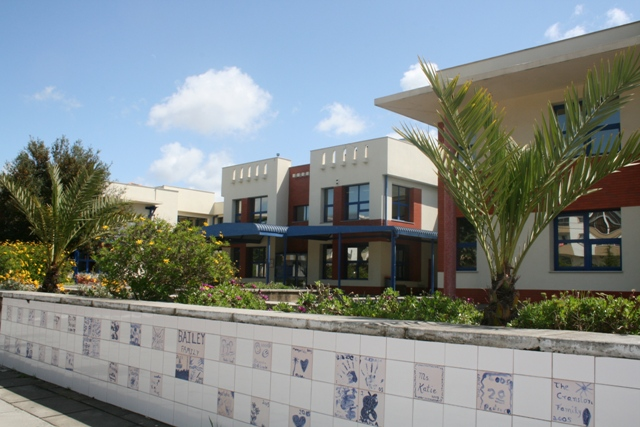

Location
- Linhó, Sintra, Lisbon District, 2710-301; Portugal; 38.768686°N 9.380012°W

Information
- Other name: CAISL
- Former name: St. Columban's School
- Type: Private international school
- Established: 1956
- Founder: Anthony A. McKenna
- Director: Nate Chapman
- Secondary Principal: Ted Fuller
- Principal: Leslie Selberg
- Grades: Pre-K — 12
- Enrollment: 750
- Language: English
- Colors: Blue and red
- Mascot: CAISL Wolves
- Accreditations: U.S. State Department; Ministry of Education; NEASC; CIS; IB
- Annual tuition: €11,000-€21,000
- Official name: Fundação Escola; Americana de Lisboa
- Website: caislisbon.org

The Carlucci American International School of Lisbon (CAISL) is a not-for-profit private international school in Linhó, Sintra, Portugal. Founded in 1956, CAISL is the oldest American school in the Iberian Peninsula and the only U.S. State Department sponsored school in Portugal. It is named in honor of Frank Carlucci, former United States Ambassador to Portugal.

CAISL offers an American High School diploma and the International Baccalaureate (IB) diploma. The student population is about 21% Portuguese, 31% American, 7% Brazilian, 8% Chinese, and 32% coming from over 50 other nations. With the teacher population being about 44% Portuguese, 41% American, 2% Brazilian and 13% from other countries. CAISL has partnerships with other institutions, such as the Gulbenkian Foundation, to support research initiatives into teaching methods, philanthropic outreach, and to host international conferences and cultural exhibitions. In 2025 was endorsed in Responsible AI in Learning for Literacy, Safety & Ethics by the Middle States Association (MSA). In 2024 was awarded MSA Program of Distinction in both Art and Music Programs. In 2016, Hewlett-Packard (HP) awarded CAISL with the HP Award for Innovation in Education. CAISL alumni have gone on to hold influential positions, both abroad and in Portugal, and have included Grammy Award-winning artists, Presidents of Portugal, and Portuguese nobility, among others.

== History ==
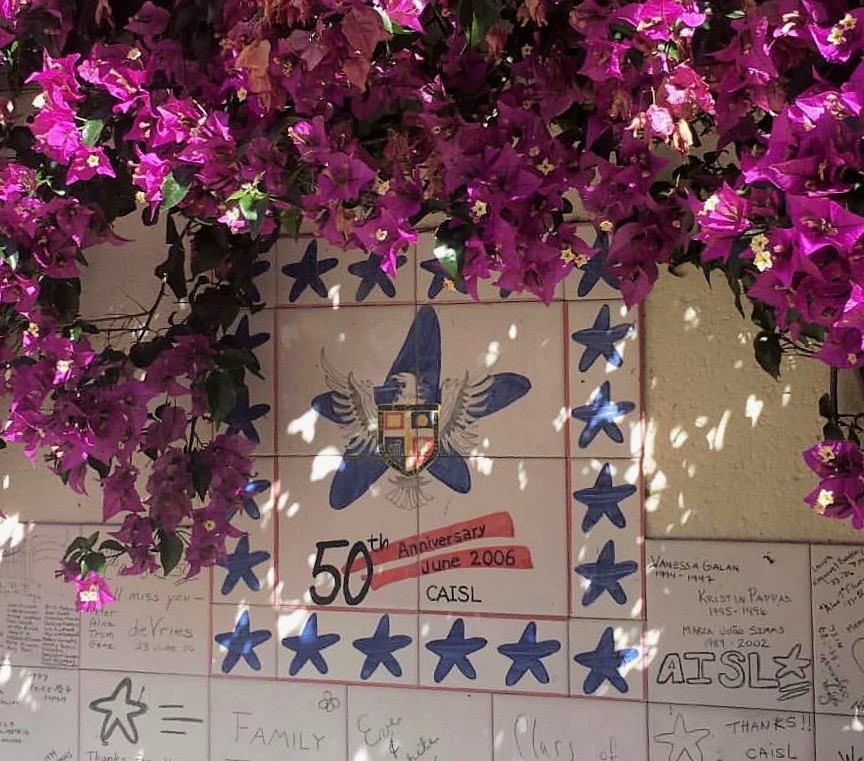
A panel of azulejos celebrating CAISL's 50th anniversary with an image of the old crest of St. Columban's School superimposed in front of CAISL's current emblem.

CAISL's history begins in 1956, when the school was founded as St. Columban's School, by Irish professor Anthony A. McKenna, to serve the children of the American engineers who were in Portugal working on the Salazar Bridge (now 25 de Abril Bridge), in Lisbon, so that the children would be able to reintegrate back into the American system upon their departure from Portugal. During this time, the school was housed in the Quinta da Casa Branca, an 18th-century quinta (manor or estate) in Carnaxide, Oeiras, outside of Lisbon.

The school renamed itself the American International School of Lisbon (AISL) in 1995, when management of the school passed from private ownership to the Fundação Escola Americana de Lisboa (American School of Lisbon Foundation; FEAL), a not-for-profit foundation was created by the American Delegation to Portugal, the Ford Motor Company, and Espírito Santo Financial Group. These three entities became the three, equal members of the school's board of trustees. With the school's new not-for-profit mission and with a new oversight organization, through FEAL, AISL became a U.S. State Department-recognized school.

After the creation of FEAL in 1995, the foundation's main priority was to centralize all of the schools of AISL onto one purpose-built site, as the secondary school, elementary school, and early child center were housed in different facilities spread across the Portuguese Riviera. In 1997, in cooperation with the municipal government of Sintra, a new purpose-built campus was built in Linhó, in the freguesia of São Pedro de Penaferrim, on land granted on a permanent lease by the municipality near the Quinta da Beloura. In 1998, the Linhó campus was inaugurated by Hillary Clinton, then the First Lady of the United States.

In 2001, the school officially changed its name to its current designation as the Frank C. Carlucci American International School of Lisbon, in honor of American diplomat Frank Carlucci, who served as the American ambassador to Portugal from 1974 to 1978. Carlucci, who went on to serve as Deputy Director of the CIA and U.S. Secretary of Defense, played a prominent role in Portugal following the events of the 1974 Carnation Revolution, especially in maintaining good Luso-American relations during the Hot Summer of 1975 as the U.S. stationed the air craft carrier USS Saratoga on the Tagus River in front of the Presidential Palace of Belém.

CAISL has maintained a friendly school rivalry with the British St. Julian's School in Carcavelos, as competitive leading international schools in Portugal.

== Administration ==
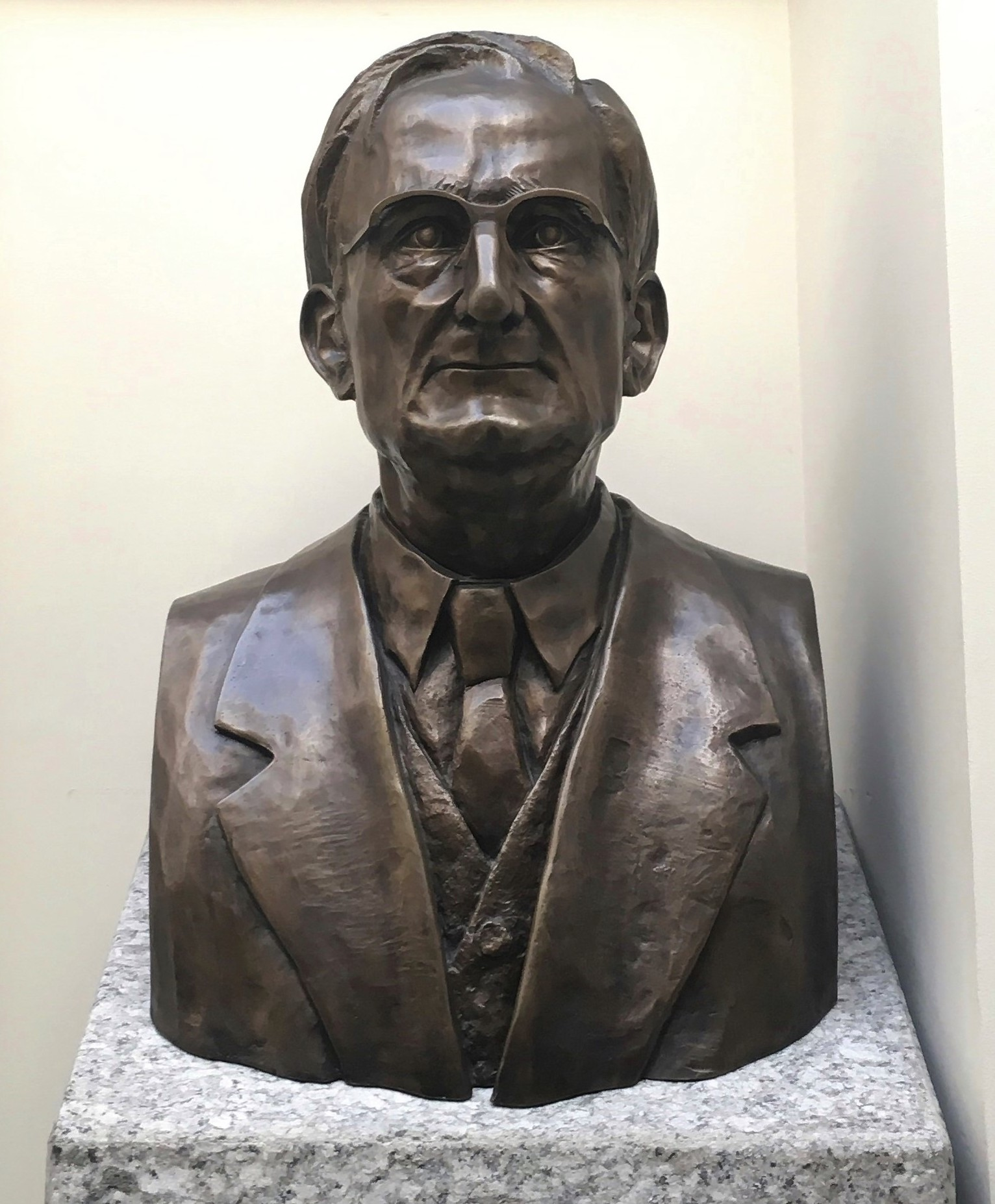
Bust of CAISL school founder Anthony A. Mckenna in the school's library rotunda

CAISL is accredited by the Middle States Association of Colleges and Schools (MSA). The school is licensed by the Portuguese Ministry of Education and an authorized International Baccalaureate (IB) World School. CAISL is the only school in Portugal with support from the U.S. State Department.

Leadership of the school's direction over its curriculum is entrusted by the Board of Trustees to the School Director, currently Mr. Nathan Chapman, who assumed the position in 2022. CAISL is divided into two sections, which are led by their own principals: the elementary school (EC3-5) and the secondary school (6-12). The current Elementary Principal is Leslie Selberg and the current Secondary Principal is Ana Almeida.

=== Governance ===
The school is governed by the Fundação Escola Americana de Lisboa (FEAL; Portuguese for "American School of Lisbon Foundation"), a private foundation under Portuguese Law, which is in turn governed by a three-member Board of Trustees. The Embassy of the United States, Lisbon and Visteon, having played important roles in the formation of CAISL's non-profit status, each appoint trustees (2 from the Embassy and 1 from Visteon) which serve for three-year terms.

The current Board of Trustees of the Fundação Escola Americana de Lisbon is composed of:

- Miguel Espírito Santo Silva de Mello, a member of the banking family Espírito Santo (representing U.S. Embassy, Lisbon and President of the Board)
- Bart Stokes (representing U.S. Embassy, Lisbon)
- Sérgio Mourão (representing Visteon)

The management of CAISL's financial matters is delegated by the Board of Trustees to the Chief Business Officer, currently Paulo Parreira.

== Academics ==
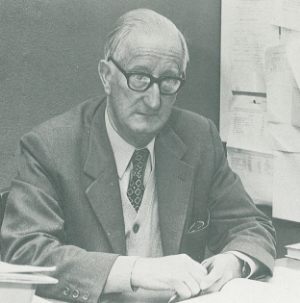
Anthony A. McKenna founded the school in 1956, making CAISL the oldest American school in the Iberian Peninsula.

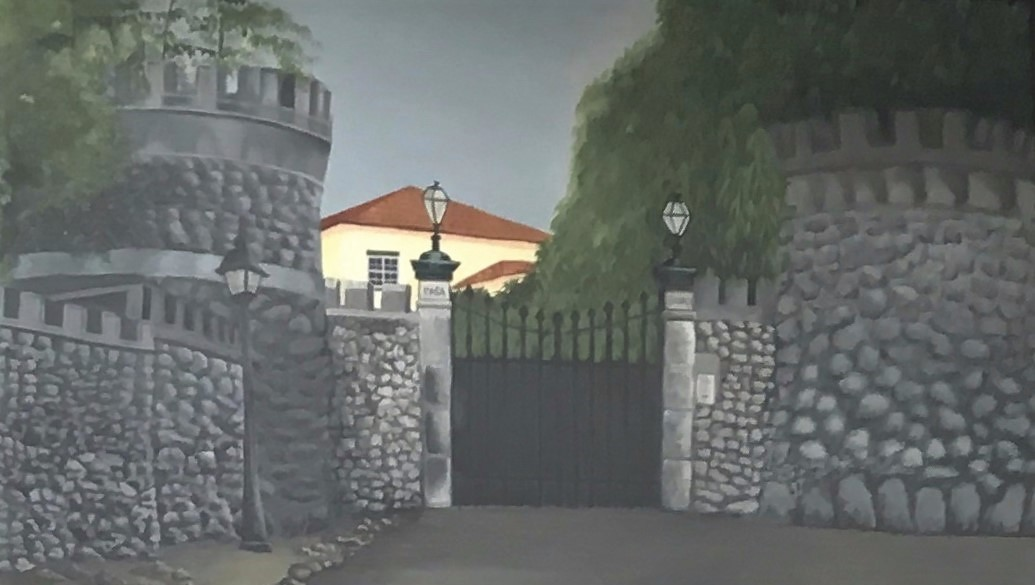
Quinta da Casa Branca, the estate which originally housed the school in Carnaxide.

All students who complete CAISL's graduation requirements earn an American high school diploma. Additionally, those who fulfill the International Baccalaureate (IB) Program requirements, earn an IB diploma. CAISL graduates are eligible to apply for entrance into universities around the world, including the United States, United Kingdom, Portugal and other European countries.

Hewlett-Packard (HP) awarded CAISL with its 2016 Award for Innovation in Education.

=== Sciences ===
CAISL is known within the region as a leader in sciences education, with numerous initiatives and partnerships with institutions, like the Gulbenkian Foundation, Silicon Valley giant Hewlett-Packard, and technology education nonprofit Code.org, to develop innovative methods of teaching science and technology.

In 2025 was endorsed in Responsible AI in Learning for Literacy, Safety & Ethics by the Middle States Association (MSA).

Since 2005, CAISL and the Gulbenkian Foundation, one of the wealthiest foundations in the world, have partnered together to form the Experiential Learning Methods in Sciences Initiative, a project aimed at researching and developing innovative methods and best practices in science education. The initiative, led by a team of Gulbenkian researchers and CAISL professors, has been stated to have had profound effects in the teaching of science education in Portugal.

CAISL is an affiliate school of Code.org in Portugal in participating in the Hour of Code initiative.

CAISL has participated annually in the FIRST Lego League Challenge National Championship, and in the MAIS Middle School Robomed, international robotics competitions, since 2018.

=== Arts ===
CAISL was awarded MSA Program of Distinction in both Art and Music Programs.

CAISL is a member of The Association for Music in International Schools (AMIS) and sends a student delegation annually to the AMIS International Music Festival.

CAISL students also participate annually in the ISTA Theater festival, having hosted the first ISTA Inter-Arts Festival.

CAISL hosts the annual Sintra Theatre Showcase (Portuguese: Mostra de Teatro das Escolas de Sintra), a showcase of school drama departments from across the Sintra area of the Portuguese Riviera.

CAISL hosts art exhibitions throughout the year.

CAISL is also part of the International Thespian Society, and the Tri-M Music Honor Society.

=== Athletics ===
CAISL's athletic teams, known as the CAISL Wolves, compete in sports tournaments on regional, national, and international levels. CAISL is a member of the European Sports Conference, a sports conference of international schools across Europe.

CAISL is a host school of both the Iberian Volleyball Tournament, the Iberian Soccer Tournament, the Iberian Basketball Tournament, and competitions of international schools across the Iberian Peninsula.

== Initiatives ==
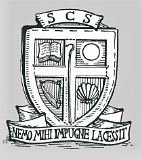
Crest of the old St. Columban's School

=== Research ===
CAISL partners with the Calouste Gulbenkian Foundation in Lisbon in supporting research and development of new teaching methods, allowing CAISL to utilize innovative pedagogical methods in its curriculum.

Since 2011, CAISL has had a partnership with the BPI Portuguese Investment Bank to facilitate investments in primary and secondary education.

In 2013, CAISL hosted its 1st Conference on Early Childhood Learning, in cooperation with Pais&Filhos, an international child education publication.

In 2018, CAISL hosted the Symposium on Intercultural Learning, an event held in partnership with the Council of International Schools.

=== Philanthropy ===
Since 2006, CAISL has partnered with Novabase, the largest information technology firm in Portugal, in an initiative to promote and support English language education in public schools across the Portuguese Riviera, through teacher training and school outreach.

In 2018, CAISL has become an affiliate of the Sharing Foundation, an international philanthropic organization dedicated to promoting literacy and early childhood education.

CAISL and Habitat for Humanity have partnered together since 2007 to send a delegation of students annually to help provide humanitarian relief to disadvantaged people. CAISL also has a long standing partnership with Banco Alimentar, the Portuguese food bank, providing volunteers for goods collection twice a year. In 2022, CAISL also started collaborating with Associação Humanitária DOMUS/The Fuller Center for Housing, among other local and international charities.

=== Culture ===
CAISL has regularly partnered with institutions, such as the American Embassy, the Portuguese Ministry of Culture and the Ministry of Culture of Cabo Verde, among other cultural organizations and government institutions, to host and promote cultural events and awareness.

=== Iberian Model United Nations ===
CAISL founded and hosts one of Europe's largest model United Nations conferences, the Iberian Model United Nations, since 1995. The conference is held in the Centro Cultural de Belém, in Lisbon. IMUN's keynote speakers have included politicians, diplomats, United Nations officials, and rights activists, such as internationally awarded author Richard Zimler and U.S. Ambassador Robert A. Sherman, and East Timorese Ambassador to Portugal Pascoela Barreto. For the 2017 edition of IMUN, President of Portugal Marcelo Rebelo de Sousa served as keynote speaker.

=== Demographics ===
At the beginning of the 2022–23 school year, enrollment was 737, with 175 Portuguese students enrolled, 176 American students enrolled, and 386 of other nationalities. Additionally, there were 97 full-time faculty members, of which 67% were fluent English speakers. At the beginning of the 2019–20 school year, enrollment was 705, with 295 students enrolled in the elementary program and 380 enrolled in the secondary program.

== Notable people ==
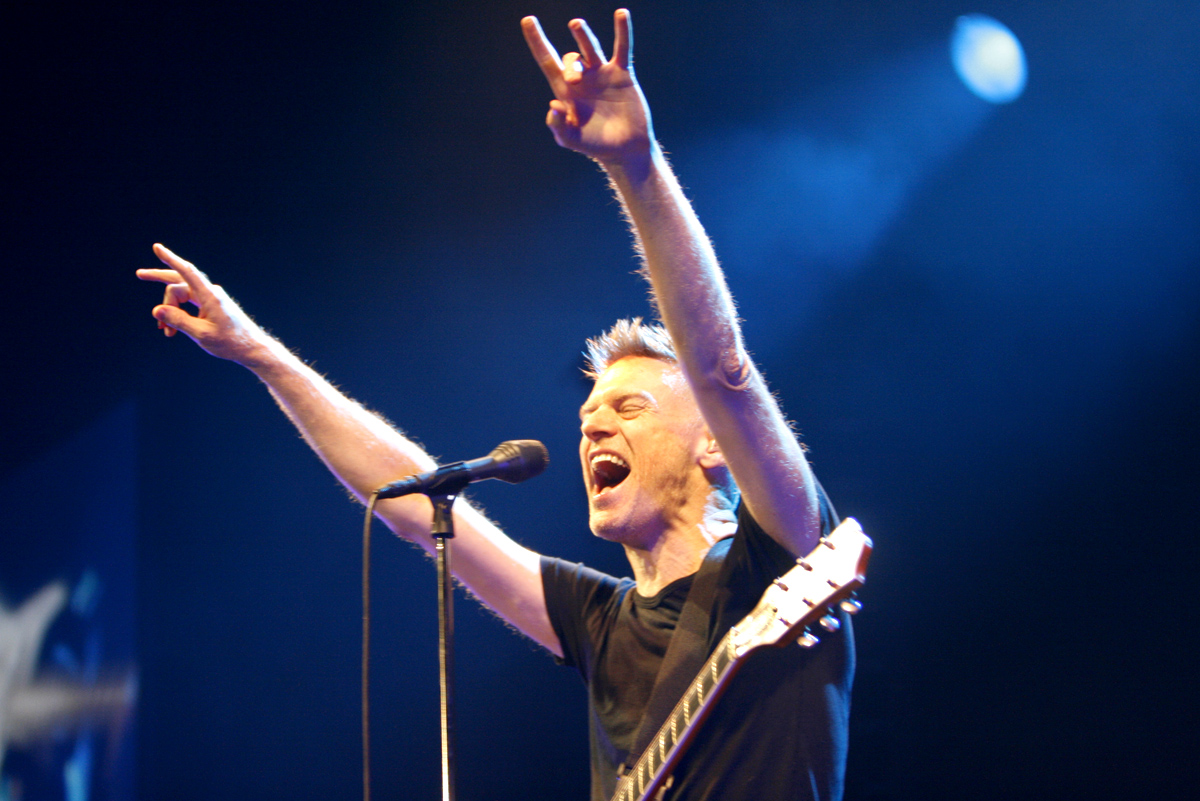
Grammy-winner, Bryan Adams (Class of '70).

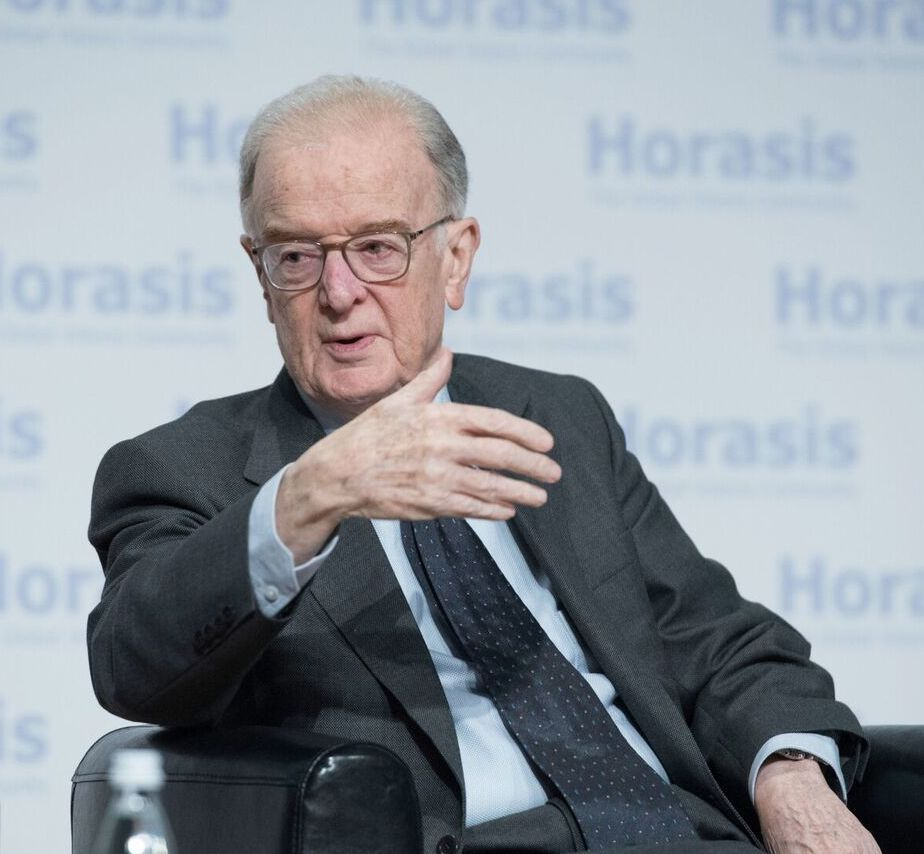
Former President of Portugal, Jorge Sampaio.

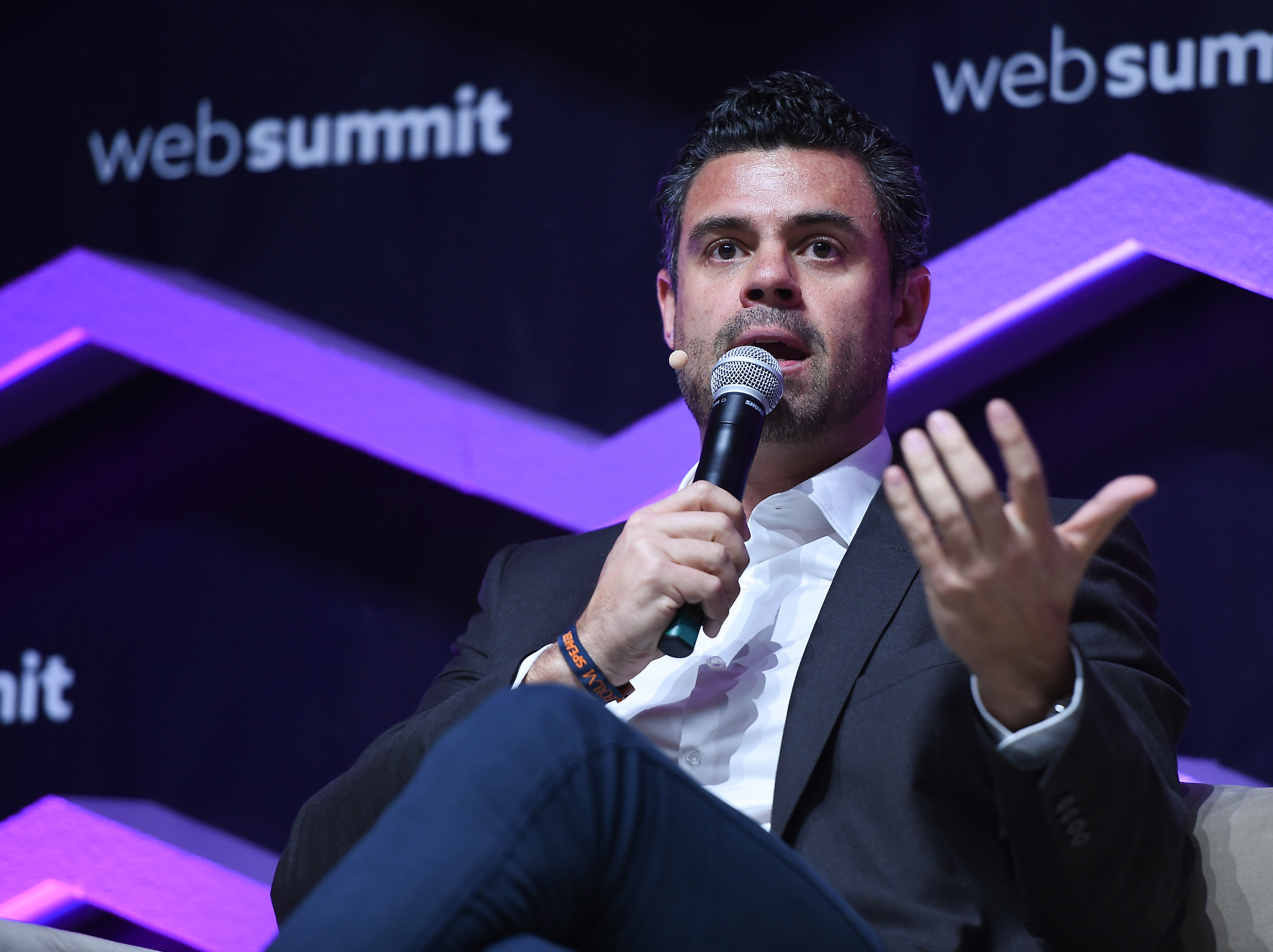
Chief of Press of UEFA, Pedro Pinto (Class of '92).

Alumni

- Jorge Sampaio - 1996—2006 President of Portugal
- Bryan Adams - Canadian musician
- Pedro Pinto - Portuguese-American journalist, former Chief of Press for UEFA and former CNN International anchor
- Diana de Cadaval - Portuguese author
- Artur Pizarro Portuguese concert pianist
- Mariana Bandhold - Portuguese singer and actress
- Mishlawi - American rapper

Faculty

- Suzanne Anton - Former Attorney General of British Columbia
