= Artur Pizarro =

Portuguese pianist

- Born: 1968 (age 57–58); Lisbon, Portugal
- Education: University of Kansas
- Occupation: Classical pianist
- Awards: Vianna da Motta International Music Competition

Artur Pizarro (born Lisbon, 1968) is an internationally acclaimed Portuguese concert pianist. Designated with the prestigious title of Yamaha Artist, Pizarro won first prize in the 1987 Vianna da Motta International Music Competition and first prize in the 1990 Leeds International Pianoforte Competition. His piano technic/knowledge is linked directly to Liszt himself (3 generations apart): his teacher for 17 years (and also his stepfather), Sequeira Costa, was a great Portuguese pianist who had studied with José Vianna Da Motta, another world famous Portuguese pianist who was one of the last pupils of Liszt.

He performs internationally in solo recitals, in duos, with chamber music groups, and as a soloist with the world's leading orchestras, including the Gulbenkian Orchestra and the Scottish Chamber Orchestra. He has an extensive discography and record deals with Linn Records, Naxos Records, Hyperion, and Collins Classics, among others.

== Early career ==
=== Studies ===
Artur Pizarro began his piano studies in Lisbon with Campos Coelho, professor of piano at the Lisbon Conservatory of Music, at age three. At age five, he began studying with pianist Sequeira Costa, also in Lisbon. In 1977, after Sequeira Costa accepted a position as Distinguished Professor of Piano at the University of Kansas, Artur followed him to Lawrence, Kansas, in the United States. He continued working with Sequeira Costa until 1990, except for a brief interruption during which Artur also worked with other teachers, including Aldo Ciccolini, Géry Moutier and Bruno Rigutto at the Conservatoire de Paris. He attended the American School of Lisbon in his youth.

=== Early performances ===
Artur Pizarro gave his first public performance at the age of three, at the Lisbon Conservatory of Music. He made his television début on Portuguese television at the age of four. He refrained from public performance for the next nine years, while he concentrated on his music studies. The young Pizarro began performing publicly again at the age of 13 with a recital début at the São Luíz Theatre in Lisbon and made his concerto debut with the Gulbenkian Orchestra later in the same year.

=== Music competition ===
Artur Pizarro won first prize in the 1987 Vianna da Motta Competition, first prize in the 1988 Greater Palm Beach Symphony Competition, and first prize in the 1990 Leeds International Pianoforte Competition.

== Current career ==
=== Performance ===
Artur Pizarro performs internationally in solo recitals, in duos, with chamber music groups, and as a soloist with the world's leading orchestras. He has worked with conductors Charles Dutoit, Sir Simon Rattle, Jean Fournier, Philippe Entremont, Yan Pascal Tortelier, Sir Andrew Davis, Esa-Pekka Salonen, Yuri Temirkanov, Vladimir Fedoseyev, Ilan Volkov, Tugan Sokhiev, Yakov Kreizberg, Yannick Nézet-Séguin, Libor Pešek, Vladimir Jurowski, and Sir Charles Mackerras. Mr. Pizarro is also very active in chamber music performance and appears regularly at chamber music festivals throughout the world, such as the Spannungen chamber music festival in Heimbach. In 2005 he formed the Pizarro Trio with violinist Raphaël Oleg and cellist Josephine Knight. He performed as a piano duo with Vita Panomariovaite. He currently performs as a piano duo with Rinaldo Zhok. Throughout 2010, Artur Pizarro performed a cycle of the complete solo piano works of Chopin over nine recitals at St. John's, Smith Square, London. The complete cycle marked the 200th anniversary of Chopin's birth.

=== Discography ===
Artur Pizarro has an extensive discography available on Linn Records, as well as on Naxos, Hyperion, Collins Classics, and other labels.

Linn Records

- CKD 355 Albéniz Iberia and Granados Goyescas (Released July 2010)
- CKD 336 Beethoven Piano Concertos 3, 4 & 5
- CKD 315 The Complete Works of Ravel Vol. 2
- CKD 293 (with Vita Panomariovaite) Rimsky-Korsakov – Piano Duos
- CKD 290 The Complete Works of Ravel Vol. 1
- CKD 250 Chopin Piano Sonatas
- CKD 248 Reminiscences – Frédéric Chopin
- CKD 244 Beethoven Piano Sonatas
- CKD 225 Beethoven: Last Three Piano Sonatas

Harmonia Mundi

- HMI 987022 Capricho Pintoresco (with Joan Enric Lluna) Miguel Yuste – Capricho Pintoresco, Turina – Sonata no.2 Op.82, Miguel Yuste – Vibraciones del alma, Eduard Toldrà – 3 Sonets, Granados /Guinovart – Fantasia sobre Goyescas, Robert Casadesus – Sonata Op.23 bis

Hyperion Records

- CDA 67014 Darius Milhaud ( with Stephen Coombs) Scaramouche, Kentuckiana, Le Bal Martiniquais, Les Songes, Carnaval à la Nouvelle-Orléans, La Libertadora, Le Boeuf sur le Toit
- CDA67163 José Vianna da Motta Piano Concerto in A major, Ballada, Fantasia Dramatica ( with Martyn Brabbins and Orquestra Gulbenkian)

Naxos

- 8.557272 Artur Pizarro Rodrigo Piano Music Naxos

Brilliant Classics

- 92790 Liszt Hungarian Rhapsodies (complete)

KLARA

- Klara KTC 4013 Arthur de Greef Concerto Nr 2 for Piano & Orchestra Flemish Radio Orchestra Cond. Yannick Nezet-Seguin.

Collins Classics

- 13572 Liszt Sonata in b minor, 3 Petrarch Sonnets, Two Legends
- 13942 Scriabin Complete Mazurkas
- 14182 Kabalevsky The Piano Sonatas, 4 Preludes Op.5, Recitative and Rondo Op.84
- 14342 Rodrigo Piano Works – Cinco Piezas del Siglo XVI, Tres Evocaciones, Cuatro Piezas para piano, Deux Berceuses, Cuatro Estampas Andaluzas, A l'ombre de Torre Bermeja
- 14582 Vorisek Piano Works Vol. 1 – Fantasie Op.12, Sonata Op.20, Variations Op.19, Impromptus Op.7
- 14662 Musiques d'Espagne ( with Sequeira Costa) Granados – El Pelele, Infante – Trois Danses Andalouses, Musiques d'Espagne, Cassado – Requiebros, Albeniz – Navarra, Falla – Two Dances from " La Vida Breve", Pantomime, Ritual Fire Dance
- 14772 Vorisek Piano Works Vol.2 – 12 Rhapsodies Op.1, Le Desir Op.3, Le Plaisir Op.4 14962 Scriabin – Shostakovich 24 Preludes Op.11, 24 Preludes Op.34
- 14982 Bach transcribed by Liszt Fantasie and Fugue BWV542, 6 Organ Preludes and Fugues BWV 543, 544, 545, 546, 547, 548
- 15052 Rachmaninov – Scriabin Concerto no.3 in d minor Op.30, Concerto in f sharp minor Op.20 (with the NDR Hannover Radio Philharmonie and Martyn Brabbins)
- 15152 Mompou Cançons i danses (Songs and Dances), Impressiones Intimas

Royal Philharmonic Records

- CDRPO 7024 (with Sequeira Costa) Rachmaninov Suite no.1 "Fantasie-Tableaux" Op.5

=== Media appearances ===
As a prominent classical musician performing frequently in the United Kingdom, Artur Pizarro can be heard regularly on BBC Radio 3 both in live performances (such as from Wigmore Hall, St. John's Smith Square, or from the BBC Proms series from the Royal Albert Hall) as well as in numerous interviews and commentary. BBC Radio 3 broadcast Artur Pizarro's live performances of the complete cycle of Beethoven's 32 piano sonatas. This was a series of broadcasts from St. John's Smith Square, London. The cycle earned Artur a Royal Philharmonic Society nomination for "Best Series." BBC Radio 3 broadcast Artur Pizarro's live performances of the complete solo works of Ravel and Debussy. All six concerts occurred in London.

== Critical acclaim ==
- Regarding Pizarro's 2009 recording of the Beethoven Piano Concertos 3, 4, & 5 on Linn Records with the Scottish Chamber Orchestra and Sir Charles Mackerras (Classic FM's CD of the Week, April 16, 2009): "This must be one of the very best…"(Musical Pointers)
- Regarding Pizarro's 2007 recording of Ravel's complete piano music on Linn Records: "This is a very grown-up disc on all counts. I would definitely recommend it and look forward to hearing the second volume."(BBC Music Online)
- Regarding Pizarro's 2006 recording of Chopin Piano Sonatas on Linn Records: "The majestic Third Sonata can hardly be bettered and with the fine natural recorded sound we could very well have the Chopin release of the year." (Marius Dawn, Pianist Magazine, March 2007)
- Regarding Pizarro's 2005 recording of Chopin pieces, Reminisces on Linn Records: "Even alongside legendary recordings by such pianists as Rubinstein, this collection features some of the finest Chopin playing on record." (The Herald)
- Regarding Pizarro's 2003 recording of Beethoven Piano Sonatas on Linn Records: "Let no one say there is no room for another set of established masterpieces when the pianist is possessed with this sort of recreative energy and exuberance." (Bryce Morrison, Gramophone, August 1, 2004) "In every way, a disc to be sought out." (The Herald)
- "There was nothing to prove – he had done it all; the audience just wanted to hear more and made it a point to shout for it as well."(Johann D'Souza, Inkpot.com, Singapore)
- "Artur Pizarro is a poet among pianists. His playing can sing. He can trace the finest of melodic lines with a purity that will catch your breath. He can colour a harmony with the subtlest of shades. He has sensitivity and power in rare balance. … Enough said?" (Michael Tumelty, The Herald)
- "Pizarro is an aristocrat, producing flowing lines in a style almost unfamiliar these days. He must be one of the best pianists of the younger generation (and arguably, of any other generation)." (Michael Tumelty, The Herald)
