= Maria Grinberg =

Russian pianist and teacher (1908–1978)

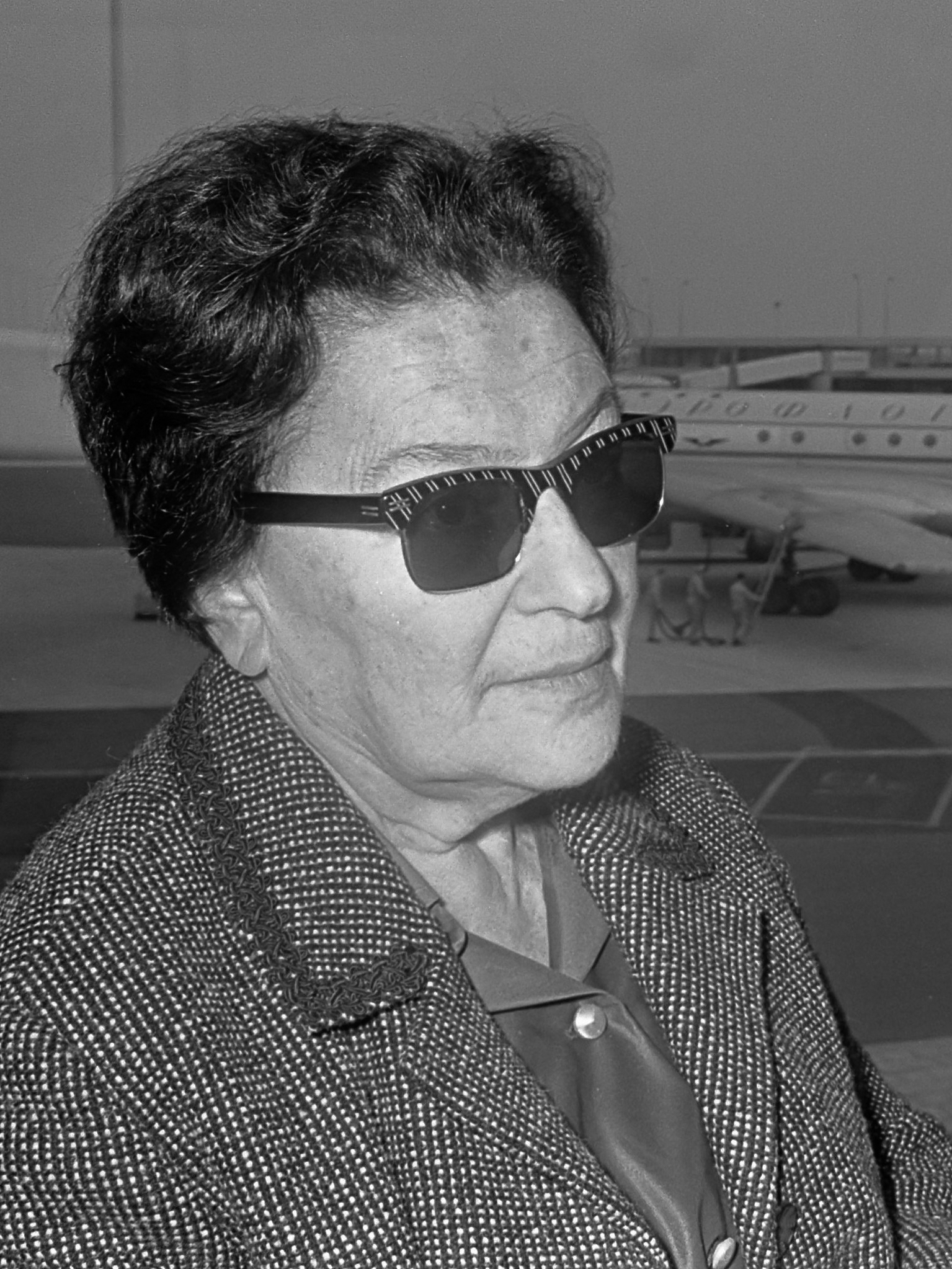
Maria Grinberg in 1968

Maria Israilevna Grinberg (Russian: Mария Израилевна Гринберг; September 6, 1908 – July 14, 1978) was a Russian pianist.

== Biography ==
She was born in Odessa, Russian Empire. Her father was a Hebrew scholar and her mother taught piano privately. Until the age of 18, Maria took piano lessons from Odessa's noted teacher David Aisberg. Eventually she became a pupil of Felix Blumenfeld (who also taught Vladimir Horowitz) and later, after his death, continued her studies with Konstantin Igumnov at the Moscow Conservatory. In 1935, she won the Second Prize at the Second All-Union Pianist Competition.

Grinberg became a major figure of the Russian piano school. She was married to baritone Peter Kirichek, with whom she also performed. In 1935 she married the Polish poet, publicist and communist Stanislaw Stande, who emigrated to the Soviet Union in 1931. With him she had a daughter, Nika, who was also a pianist. However, in 1937 both her husband and her father were arrested and executed as "enemies of the people". The pianist was fired by the state-run management and got a job as an accompanist of an amateur choreography group. During that time, she occasionally participated in concert performances playing timpani. Somehow, she later was readmitted as a piano soloist. She became a much-sought-after pianist in Moscow, with concerts in Leningrad, Riga, Tallinn, Voronezh, Tbilisi, Baku and other cities all over the Soviet Union.

At the age of 50, after Joseph Stalin died, she was finally allowed to travel abroad. In all, Grinberg went on 14 performing tours – 12 times in the Soviet bloc countries and twice in the Netherlands where she became a nationally acclaimed figure. Critics compared her performances with those of Vladimir Horowitz, Arthur Rubinstein, and Clara Haskil.

Only at the age of 55, was she granted her first – and last – honorary title of Distinguished Artist of the Russian Soviet Federation. At 61, she was given a professorship at the Gnessin Institute of Music, where she had a close friendship with pianist Maria Yudina, who said Grinberg was the "one person she wanted to play at her funeral". Among those on the long list of her pupils are Michael Bischoffberger, Naum Shtarkman and Regina Shamvili.

In 1970, her 13-LP album set featuring all of Beethoven's 32 piano sonatas was released. This was the first time a Russian pianist recorded the complete set of the Beethoven piano sonatas. Three months before Grinberg's death in 1978, a review by critic Yudenich in the Sovetskaya Muzyka magazine called these recordings "a true feat of art".

When she was in her late 40s, she noticed that her vision had become significantly worse. She addressed the problem, and it turned out that she had a brain tumor which required surgery. Within a few months, she celebrated her 50th birthday by performing three piano concertos in one evening – Bach's f minor, Beethoven Third, and Rachmaninoff's Third with Moscow Philharmonic Orchestra.

Maria Grinberg died on July 14, 1978, in Tallinn, Estonia, ten weeks before her seventieth birthday. The Gnessin Institute's director, chorus master Vladimir Minin (who a year before had forced Grinberg to resign from her teaching position), refused to hold a memorial ceremony on the Institute's premises, and it was only thanks to the efforts of Deputy Minister of Culture Kukharsky, the great pianist was given her last honor in a proper way.

Her sense of humor was legendary. Those who knew her recall a story. Her patronymic was Israilyevna (that is, "daughter of Israel", Israel being the first name of her father). In 1967, during the period of heightened tension between the Soviet Union and the State of Israel which the Soviets always addressed as "Israeli aggressors," Grinberg introduced herself as "Maria Aggressorovna."
