= Embassy of Ukraine, Lisbon =

Embassy of Ukraine in Portugal

Embassy of Ukraine in Portugal
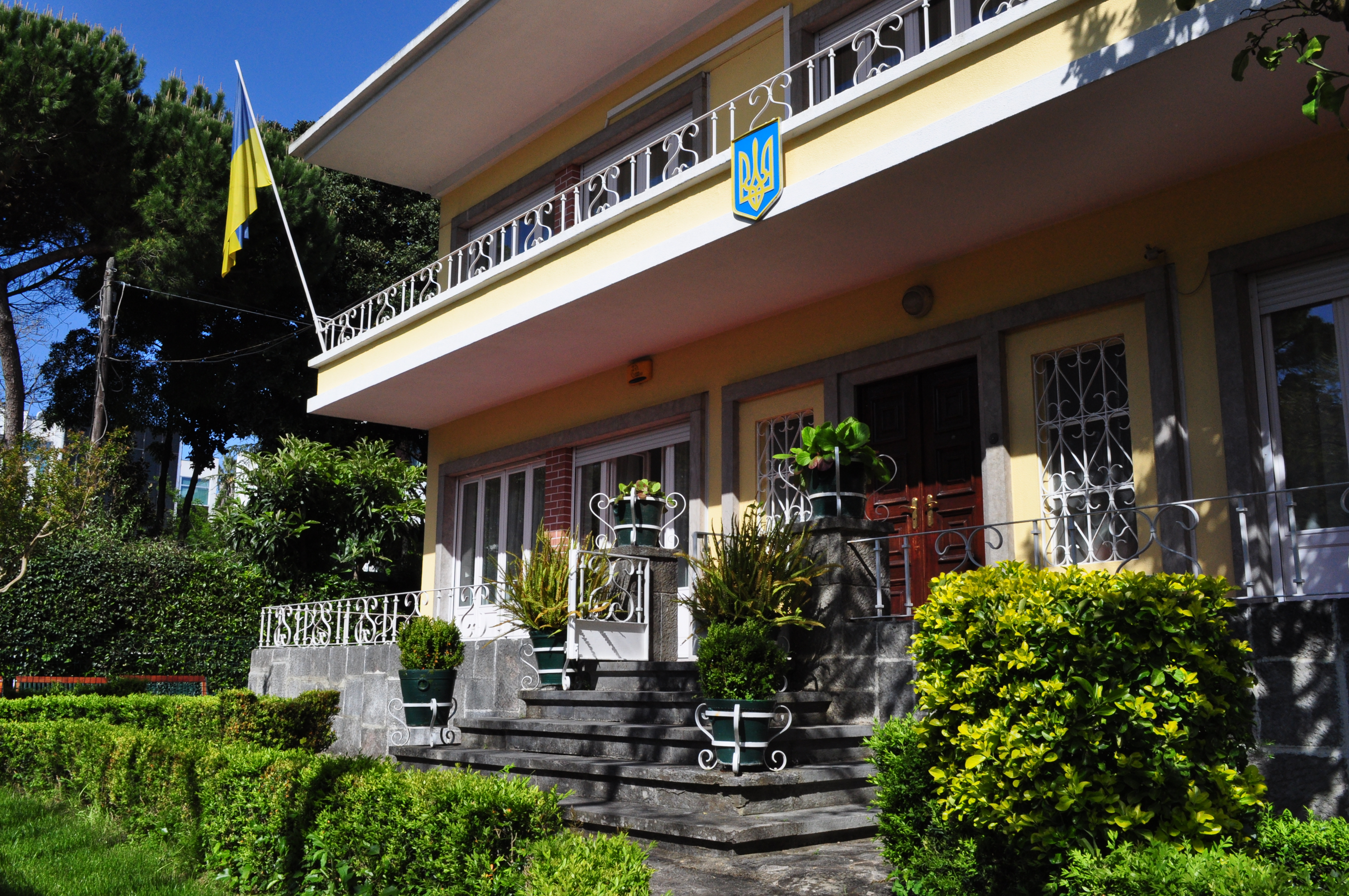
- Embassy of Ukraine in Lisbon
- Location: Lisbon, Portugal
- Address: Avenida das Descobertas, nº18 – Restelo 1400-092
- Coordinates: 38°42′24″N 9°12′57″W
- Ambassador: Inna Ohnivez since 2015
- Website: Official Website

Embassy of Ukraine in Portugal (Ukrainian: Посольство України в Португалії) is the diplomatic mission of Ukraine in Lisbon, Portugal. Since 2015, the Ukrainian ambassador in Portugal has been Inna Ohnivez.

== History of diplomatic relations ==
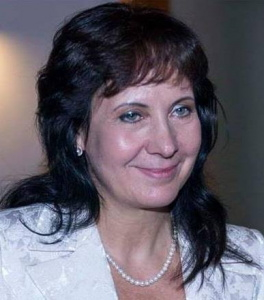
Inna Ohnivez

Portugal recognized the independence of Ukraine on January 7, 1992. Diplomatic relations between two countries were established on January 27, 1992. The embassy of Ukraine in Lisbon was opened in March 2000.

== See also ==
- Portugal-Ukraine relations
- List of diplomatic missions in Portugal
- Foreign relations of Portugal
- Foreign relations of Ukraine
