= List of diplomatic missions in Portugal =

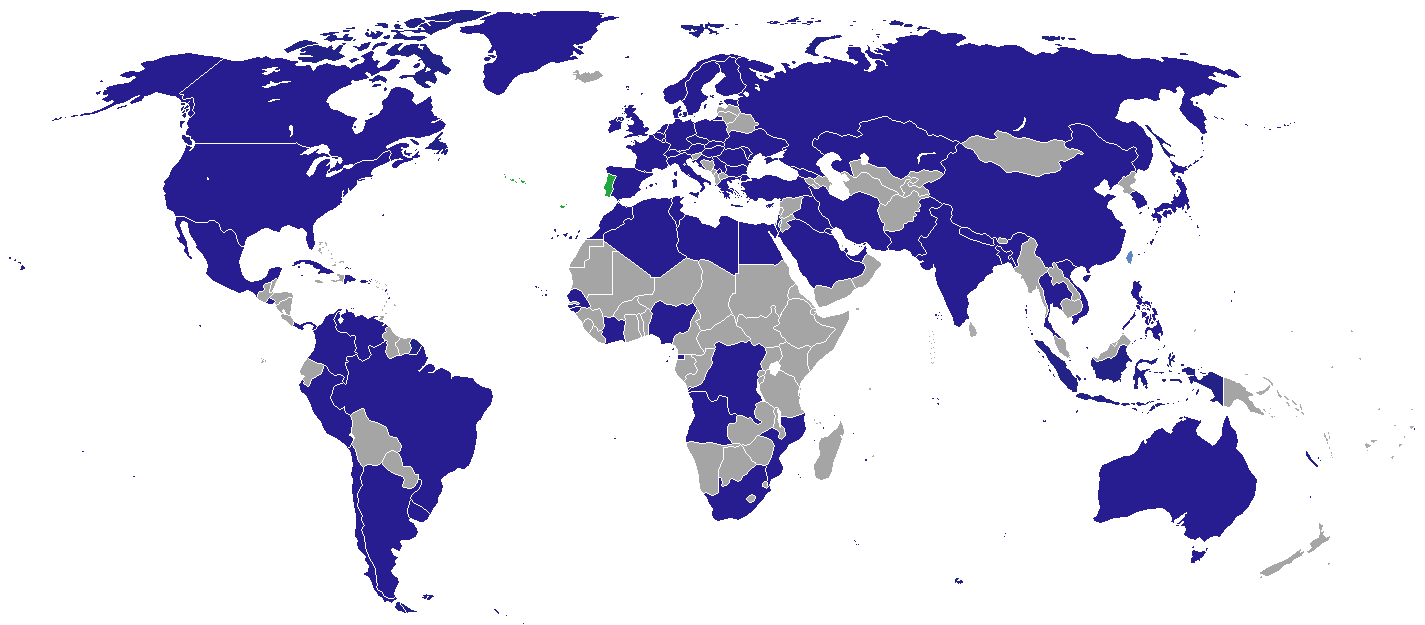
Map of diplomatic missions in Portugal

This article lists diplomatic missions resident in Portugal. At present, the capital city of Lisbon hosts 89 embassies. In addition are consulates in Porto and other major cities. As Lisbon is also the seat of the Community of Portuguese Language Countries (CPLP), a few of the organization's member-states maintain permanent missions to it, separate from their respective embassies.

Several countries have ambassadors accredited to Portugal, with most being resident in Paris.

This listing omits honorary consulates.

== Diplomatic missions in Lisbon ==
Country	Mission type	Photo	Location	Parish	Link
Algeria	Embassy		Rua Duarte Pacheco Pereira, 58	Belém	
Andorra	Embassy		Rua do Possolo, 76	Estrela	
Angola	Embassy		Avenida da República, 68	Avenidas Novas	
Argentina	Embassy		Avenida João Crisóstomo, 8	Areeiro	
Australia	Embassy		Avenida da Liberdade, 200	Santo António	
Austria	Embassy		Avenida Infante Santo, 43	Estrela	
Bangladesh	Embassy		Estrada do Forte do Alto do Duque, 1587	Belém	
Belgium	Embassy		Rua Castilho, 75	Santo António	
Brazil	Embassy		Estrada das Laranjeiras, 144	Avenidas Novas	
Bulgaria	Embassy		Rua do Sacramento à Lapa, 31	Estrela	
Canada	Embassy		Avenida da Liberdade, 200	Santo António	
Cape Verde	Embassy		Avenida do Restelo, 33	Belém	
Chile	Embassy		Avenida da República, 32	Avenidas Novas	
China	Embassy		Rua de São Caetano à Lapa, 2	Estrela	
Colombia	Embassy		Palácio Sotto Mayor, Avenida Fontes Pereira de Melo, 16	Arroios	
Congo-Kinshasa	Embassy		Rua Fernão Gomes, 14	Belém	
Croatia	Embassy		Rua Dom Lourenço de Almeida, 24	Belém	
Cuba	Embassy		Rua Pêro da Covilhã, 14	Belém	
Cyprus	Embassy		Avenida da Liberdade, 229	Santo António	
Czech Republic	Embassy		Rua Pero de Alenquer, 14	Belém	
Denmark	Embassy		Rua Castilho, 14	Santo António	
Dominican Republic	Embassy		Campo Grande, 35, 12A	Alvalade	
Egypt	Embassy		Avenida Dom Vasco da Gama, 8	Belém	
El Salvador	Embassy		Avenida João Crisóstomo, 25	Avenidas Novas	
Equatorial Guinea	Embassy		Avenida João Crisóstomo, 25	Avenidas Novas	
Estonia	Embassy		Rua Filipe Folque, 10-J	Avenidas Novas	
Finland	Embassy		Rua do Possolo, 76	Estrela	
France	Embassy		Palácio do Marquês de Abrantes, Rua de Santos-o-Velho, 5	Estrela	
Georgia	Embassy		Rua Fernão Soares, 6-A	Belém	
Germany	Embassy		Campo dos Mártires da Pátria, 38	Arroios	
Greece	Embassy		Rua do Alto do Duque, 13	Belém	
Guinea-Bissau	Embassy		Rua de Alcolena, 17-A	Belém	
Holy See	Apostolic Nunciature		Avenida Luís Bivar, 18	Avenidas Novas	
Hungary	Embassy		Calçada de Santo Amaro, 85	Alcântara	
India	Embassy		Rua Pêro da Covilhã, 16A	Belém	
Indonesia	Embassy		Avenida Dom Vasco da Gama, 40	Belém	
Iran	Embassy		Rua do Alto do Duque, 49	Belém	
Iraq	Embassy		Rua Arriaga, 9	Estrela	
Ireland	Embassy		Avenida da Liberdade, 200	Santo António	
Israel	Embassy		Rua António Enes, 16	Avenidas Novas	
Italy	Embassy		Largo Conde de Pombeiro, 6	Arroios	
Ivory Coast	Embassy		Avenida Dom Vasco da Gama, 36A	Belém	
Japan	Embassy		Rua Ramalho Ortigão 51, 6º andar	Avenidas Novas	
Kazakhstan	Embassy		Rua Pêro da Covilhã, 20	Belém	
Kosovo	Embassy		Rua Gonçalo Velho Cabral, 33	Belém	
Kuwait	Embassy		Rua de Alcolena, 28	Belém	
Libya	Embassy		Avenida das Descobertas, 24	Belém	
Luxembourg	Embassy		Rua das Janelas Verdes, 43	Estrela	
Malta	Embassy		Avenida da Liberdade, 245	Santo António	
Mexico	Embassy		Estrada de Monsanto, 78	Benfica	
Moldova	Embassy		Rua Gonçalo Velho Cabral, 31	Belém	
Monaco	Embassy		Rua Domingos Sequeira, 27 r/c esq.	Estrela	
Morocco	Embassy		Rua do Alto do Duque, 21	Belém	
Mozambique	Embassy		Rua Filipe Folque, 10-J	Avenidas Novas	
Nepal	Embassy				
Netherlands	Embassy		Avenida Infante Santo, 43-5.°	Estrela	
Nigeria	Embassy		Avenida Dom Vasco da Gama, 3	Belém	
Norway	Embassy		Avenida Dom Vasco da Gama, 1	Belém	
Pakistan	Embassy		Rua António Saldanha, 46	Belém	
Palestine	Embassy				
Panama	Embassy		Rua Pero de Alenquer, 5	Belém	
Peru	Embassy		Avenida da Liberdade, 144, 8.º Esq.	Santo António	
Philippines	Embassy		Rua Barata Salgueiro, 30, 3.º	Santo António	
Poland	Embassy		Avenida das Descobertas, 2	Belém	
Qatar	Embassy		Avenida do Restelo, 34	Belém	
Romania	Embassy		Rua de São Caetano à Lapa, 5	Estrela	
Russia	Embassy		Rua Visconde de Santarém, 57	Arroios	
São Tomé and Príncipe	Embassy		Rua Laura Alves, 12, 3.º	Avenidas Novas	
Saudi Arabia	Embassy		Avenido do Restelo, 42	Belém	
Senegal	Embassy		Avenida Vasco da Gama, 4	Belém	
Serbia	Embassy		Rua de Alcolena, 11	Belém	
Slovakia	Embassy		Avenida da Liberdade, 200	Santo António	
South Africa	Embassy		Avenida Luís Bivar, 10	Avenidas Novas	
South Korea	Embassy		Avenida Miguel Bombarda, 36	Avenidas Novas	
Sovereign Military Order of Malta	Embassy		Rua São Francisco de Borja, 42B	Estrela	
Spain	Embassy		Palácio Mayer, Rua do Salitre, 1	Santo António	
Sweden	Embassy		Rua Miguel Lupi, 12, 2.°	Estrela	
Switzerland	Embassy		Travessa do Jardim, 17	Estrela	
Thailand	Embassy		Rua de Alcolena, 12	Belém	
Timor-Leste	Embassy		Largo dos Jerónimos, 3	Belém	
Tunisia	Embassy		Rua Rodrigo Rebelo, 16	Belém	
Turkey	Embassy		Avenida das Descobertas, 22	Belém	
Ukraine	Embassy		Avenida das Descobertas, 18	Belém	
United Arab Emirates	Embassy		Praça do Príncipe Real, 14	Misericórdia	
United Kingdom	Embassy		Rua de São Bernardo, 33	Campo de Ourique	
United States	Embassy		Avenida das Forças Armadas, 133	Avenidas Novas	
Uruguay	Embassy		Rua Marquês de Fronteira, 111, 4.º esq.	Avenidas Novas	
Venezuela	Embassy		Avenida das Descobertas, 22	Belém	
Vietnam	Embassy				

== Other delegations, missions and consulates-general in Lisbon ==
Country	Mission type.	Photo
Angola	Consulate-General	
Brazil	Consulate-General	
Catalonia	Delegation	
Macau	Macau Economic and Trade Office	
Paraguay	Consulate-General	
Republic of China (Taiwan)	Economic & Cultural Centre	
Venezuela	Consulate-General	

== Consulates in other cities ==
Country	Mission type	City	Photo	Link
Angola	Consulate-General	Porto		
Brazil	Consulate-General	Faro		
Brazil	Consulate-General	Porto		
Guinea-Bissau	Consulate-General	Albufeira		
Mozambique	Consulate-General	Porto		
Spain	Consulate-General	Porto		
Ukraine	Consulate	Porto		
United Kingdom	Vice-Consulate	Portimão		
United States	Consulate	Ponta Delgada		
Venezuela	Consulate-General	Funchal		

== Permanent Missions to the Community of Portuguese Language Countries (CPLP) in Lisbon ==
Country	Mission type	Photo	Reference
Angola	Permanent Mission		
Brazil	Permanent Mission		
Mozambique	Permanent Mission		
Portugal	Permanent Mission		
Timor-Leste	Permanent Mission		

== Non-resident embassies ==
=== Resident in Brussels, Belgium ===
- Bhutan
- Fiji
- Grenada
- Jamaica

=== Resident in London, United Kingdom ===
- Antigua and Barbuda
- Botswana
- Costa Rica
- Ecuador
- Eswatini
- Lesotho
- Malawi
- Maldives
- Lithuania
- Sierra Leone

=== Resident in Paris, France ===
- Afghanistan
- Albania
- Belarus
- Benin
- Brunei
- Burkina Faso
- Burundi
- Cambodia
- Cameroon
- Central African Republic
- Chad
- Comoros
- Congo-Brazzaville
- Djibouti
- Gabon
- Gambia
- Ghana
- Guatemala
- Honduras
- Haiti
- Iceland
- Kenya
- Laos
- Liberia
- Malaysia
- Mali
- Mauritania
- Mauritius
- Mongolia
- Namibia
- New Zealand
- Nicaragua
- Niger
- North Macedonia
- Oman
- Rwanda
- Seychelles
- Singapore
- South Sudan
- Sri Lanka
- Sudan
- Tanzania
- Uganda
- Yemen
- Zambia
- Zimbabwe

=== Resident in Rome, Italy ===
- Armenia
- Lebanon
- Myanmar
- North Korea

=== Resident elsewhere ===
- Azerbaijan (Rabat)
- Bosnia and Herzegovina (The Hague)
- Bolivia (The Hague)
- Bahrain (Rabat)
- Ethiopia (Geneva)
- Jordan (Bern)
- Kiribati (New York City)
- Latvia (Tallinn)
- Montenegro (Podgorica)
- Slovenia (Ljubljana)
- San Marino (San Marino)

== Closed missions ==
Host city	Sending country	Mission	Year closed	Ref.
Lisbon	Albania	Embassy (Note: Resident in Paris, Ile-de-France, France)	2014	
Lisbon	Ecuador	Embassy (Note: Resident in London, England, United Kingdom)	2014	
Lisbon	Latvia	Embassy (Note: Resident in Tallinn, Harju, Estonia)	2015	
Lisbon	Lithuania	Embassy	2014	
Lisbon	North Korea	Embassy (Note: Resident in Rome, Lazio, Italy)	1993	
Lisbon	Rhodesia	Mission	1975	
Lisbon	Slovenia	Embassy (Note: Resident in Ljubljana, Central Slovenia Statistical Region, Slovenia)	2012	
Faro	Angola	Consulate-General	2018	
Funchal	United Kingdom	Consular office	2006	
Ponta Delgada	Brazil	Consulate	2019	
Porto	France	Consulate-General	2015	
Porto	United Kingdom	Consulate	2012	
Porto	United States	Consulate-General	2004	
Porto	Venezuela	Consulate-General	2019	
Valença	Spain	Consulate	2014	
Vila Real de Santo António	Spain	Consulate	2014	

== See also ==
- Foreign relations of Portugal
- List of diplomatic missions of Portugal
