= Taipei Economic and Cultural Center, Lisbon =

Taipei Economic and Cultural Center in Portugal 駐葡萄牙台北經濟文化中心
- Centro Económico e Cultural de Taipei em Portugal

Agency overview
- Formed: 1992
- Jurisdiction: Portugal (including Azores and Madeira); Cape Verde; Guinea-Bissau; São Tomé and Príncipe
- Headquarters: Lisbon, Portugal
- Agency executive: Grace Ya-kuang Chang, Representative
- Website: Centro Económico e Cultural de Taipei em Portugal

The Taipei Economic and Cultural Center in Portugal (Chinese: 駐葡萄牙台北經濟文化中心) (Portuguese: Centro Económico e Cultural de Taipei em Portugal) represents the interests of Taiwan in Portugal in the absence of formal diplomatic relations, functioning as a de facto embassy.

There is currently no counterpart organisation representing Portugal in Taipei.

The Centre was established in 1992. It is headed by a Representative, Vivia Chun-Fei Chang.

In addition to responsibility for Portugal, including the Autonomous Regions of the Azores and Madeira, it also has responsibility Cape Verde, Guinea-Bissau and São Tomé and Príncipe in Africa.

== History ==
From 1950 to 1975, Portugal recognised Taiwan as the Republic of China, which had a legation in Lisbon, as well as a Consulate in Dili in the then Portuguese Timor. In March 1975, following the Carnation Revolution the previous year, the new Portuguese government ordered Taipei to close its Legation and severed diplomatic relations with it. Portugal later established diplomatic relations with the People's Republic of China in 1979.

Taiwan was also represented in Macau when it was under Portuguese administration by the "Special Commissariat of the Ministry of Foreign Affairs of the Republic of China". However, following the "12-3" riots in 1966, the Portuguese government agreed to close its office down.

== See also ==
- Portugal–Taiwan relations
- List of diplomatic missions of Taiwan
- List of diplomatic missions in Portugal
