= Regina Shamvili =

American pianist

- Born: October 1, 1945; Tbilisi, Soviet Georgia
- Died: April 2, 2025 (aged 79); New York, New York
- Occupation: Pianist

Regina with John Paul II

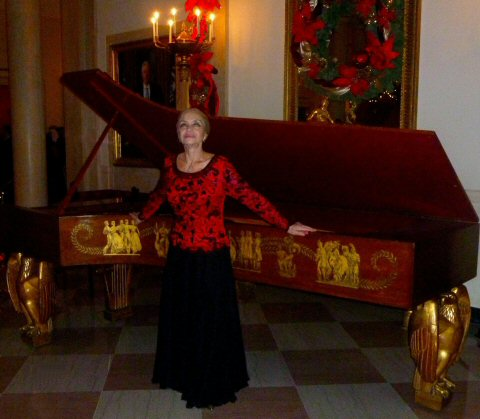
The White House Concert

Performance at the Concord Pavilion

Regina Shamvili (/rɪˈdʒɪnə/ rij-IN-ə) was an American concert pianist and an artist of the United States Department of State. She was born in Tbilisi, Georgia, and lived much of her life in New York City.

Shamvili graduated from both the Tbilisi State Conservatory and the Moscow Conservatory. She studied with such legendary pianists as Maria Grinberg, Yakov Flier and Grigory Ginzburg, and became a professional pianist when she was 17. She toured the length and breadth of the Soviet Union every year and performed regularly on television and radio. For twenty years she was a household name in Moscow, Leningrad, Samarkand, Novosibirsk, Tashkent and the hundreds of small towns and cities in between. She recorded three albums in Russia with works by Schubert, Schumann, Beethoven, Chopin, Mendelssohn and Glinka on the Melodia label in Russia. She won many national awards, but was refused permission to travel abroad. That led her to emigrate in 1983.

Shamvili was a citizen of the United States from 1983 until 2013, and performed concerts in over one hundred countries around the world. Venues ranging from Concord Pavilion in California to Teatro Coloseo in Buenos Aires to medieval Teatro Olimpico di Vicenza... Recordings on the PolyGram (Netherlands) and VDE-Gallo Records (Switzerland).

The US Ambassador of goodwill for the United States. Cultural programs under auspices of the US Embassies around the world. "She reinforced the important role of culture in our bilateral relationship and marked a milestone in our cultural exchange activities" - John Negroponte.

Shamvili gave several UNESCO sponsored concerts in Asia and Africa. She was the first Western musician in recent times to give live performances in Saudi Arabia - BBC Music Magazine. She also gave command performances at the White House, Vatican City and Castel Gandolfo.

Shamvili's international appeal was documented by the Bureau of Public Affairs in a special TV presentation; TROS (The Netherlands), BRTN (Belgium), Russia Today TV programs aired by National TV channels. CNN worldwide coverage of a return performance in Moscow.
