= Grigory Ginzburg =

Russian pianist (1904–1961)

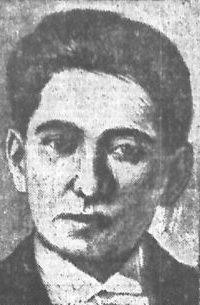
Ginzburg c. 1926

Grigory Romanovich Ginzburg (Russian: Григо́рий Рома́нович Ги́нзбург; 29 May 1904 in Nizhny Novgorod – 5 December 1961 in Moscow) was a Soviet pianist.

== Biography ==
Ginzburg first studied with his mother before being accepted as a student in Aleksandr Goldenweiser's class at Moscow Conservatory. In 1927 he gained fourth prize in the Warsaw I International Chopin Piano Competition. He was recognized as one of the finest musicians in the Soviet Union and toured Europe several times. He became an important professor at the Moscow Conservatory in 1929. Some of his best-known students are Gleb Axelrod, Sergei Dorensky, Regina Shamvili and Sulamita Aronovsky.

Ginzburg was best known for his piano touch that had ties with the tradition of 19th century players such as Franz Liszt. His eclectic repertoire and his art of transcription made of him one of the most unique performers in piano history.

== Discography ==
- Grigory Ginzburg: Live Recordings, 3 volumes (6CDs), Vox Aeterna, 2006
- Russian Piano School: Goldenweiser & Ginzburg, RCD, 2004
- Great Pianists of The 20th Century, Vol.37 Grigory Ginsburg, Philips, 1999
- The Gregory Ginzburg Legacy, 10 Volumes (11CDs), Arlecchino
- Grigory Ginzburg ロシアピアノの巨匠達, 3 volumes, Triton
- Russian Piano School Vol.12 - Liszt Opera Paraphrases, BMG/Melodiya
- Tchaikovsky / Rachmaninov Piano Concertos - Grigory Ginsburg, Lev Oborin, Konstantin Ivanov, Vista Vera
- Great Artists in Moscow Conservatoire: Liszt - Grigory Ginzburg, Moscow State Conservatory
- Frederic Chopin: Piano music 1 - Gregory Ginzburg, Monopole
- Russian Treasure - Liszt, Rubinstein, Multisonic
- Russian Treasure - Tchaikovsky, Schumann, Multisonic
- Grigory Ginzburg: His Early Recordings, 2 Volumes, APR
- Grigory Ginzburg Studio Recordings (4CDs), Vox Aeterna
- Keyboard Fireworks by Liszt, Sterling Classics
- The Art of Grigori Ginsburg (3CDs), Venezia (CDVE00018)
- Rubinstein & Liszt Piano Works - Grigori Ginzburg, Mobile Fidelity
- Tchaikovsky / Arensky Piano Concertos, Russian Disc
- Liszt Piano Concertos, Russian Disc
- Dvorak / Kabalevsky Piano Concertos, Russian Disc
- Mozart / Rubinstein Piano Concertos, Russian Disc
- Russian Pianists II, Green Door
- 「ショパン・コンクールの歴史 第一集」, DIW Classics
- Legendary Russian Pianists, Brilliant Classics
- The Great Piano Music of the World 7: Liszt - G. Ginsburg, Melodiya (for the educational purpose, not for sale)
- Melodiya LP

Bach: Violin Sonata BWV 1017 (vn L. Kogan)
Bach/Busoni: Toccata and Fugue BWV 565
Beethoven: Für Elise
Beethoven: Violin Sonata No.1 & No.3 (vn L. Kogan)
Beethoven/Liszt: Ruinen von Athen Fantasia (Cond. A. Gauk / Radio Symphony Orchestra)
Bellini/Liszt: Norma Fantasia
Chopin: Ballade No.4
Chopin: Etudes Op.10-1&3
Chopin: 12 Etudes Op.25
Chopin: 4 Impromptu
Chopin: Mazurka No.17, No.16, No.48, No.52, No.14, No.57 & No.13
Chopin: Polonaise No.2, No.3, No.6 & No.12
Chopin: Waltz No.2, No.3, No.5 & No.7
Gerter: Waltz
Gershwin: 3 Preludes
Grieg: Cello Sonata Op.36 (vc Y. Slobodkin)
Grieg: Piano Sonata Op.7
Haydn: Violin Sonata (Arr. from Piano Sonata No.26)(vn L. Kogan)
Haydn: Violin Sonata No.4 & No.7 (vn L. Kogan)
Gounod/Liszt: Waltz from Faust
Liszt: Au Lac de Wallenstadt, Au bord d'une source, Le mal du pays, Les cloches de Genève & Vallée d'Obermann
Liszt: Concert Etudes No.2 La Leggierezza & No.3 Un sospiro
Liszt: Concert Etude No.2 Gnomenreigen
Liszt: Gondliera & Tarantella
Liszt: Hungarian Rhapsodies No.17 & No.18
Liszt: Polonaise No.1
Liszt/Busoni: Totentanz (Cond. N. Anosov / State Symphony Orchestra)
Medtner: Sonata Reminiscence Op.38-1
Mozart: Fantasia KV 475
Mozart: Piano Concerto No.25 (Cond. K. Kondrashin / Radio Symphony Orchestra)
Mozart: Piano Sonata No.8
Mozart: Violin Sonata KV 376 (vn L. Kogan)
Mozart/Liszt: Don Giovanni Fantasia
Mozart/Liszt/Busoni: Figaro Fantasia
Myaskovsky: Song and Rhapsody Op.58
Paganini/Liszt: Paganini Etude No.3, No.4 & No.5
Paganini/Schumann: Paganini Etude Op.3 No.1 & No.2
Prokofiev: Piano Sonata No.3
Rachmaninov: 6 Duets Op.11 (pf. A. Goldenweiser)
Rachmaninov: Suite No.1 Op.5 (pf. A. Goldenweiser)
Rameau/Godowsky: 2 Menuets, Rigaudon & Elegie
Rossini/Ginzburg: Cavatina of Figaro
Rubinstein: Etude Op.23-2
Rubinstein: Piano Concerto No.4 (Cond. A. Shereshevsky / State Orchestra)
Ruzhitsky/Ginzburg: Kasanova Fantasia
Schubert/Liszt: Erlkönig, Aufenthalt, Gretchen am Spinnrade
Schumann: ABEGG Variations
Schumann: Toccata
Scriabin: 6 Etudes Op.8-6,3,1,7,11,12
J.Strauss II/Grünfel: Waltz Frühlingsstimmen
J.Strauss II/Schulz-Evler: Arabesque on theme by Waltz 'An der shönen blauen Donau'
J.Strauss II/Tausig: Waltz Caprice No.2
Verdi/Liszt: Rigoletto Paraphrase
Weber: Perpetuum Mobile
Weber: Rondo Brillante
Weber: Violin Sonata No.1, No.2 & No.5 (vn L. Kogan)
