= Gleb Axelrod =

Russian pianist

Gleb Borisovich Axelrod
- Глеб Борисович Аксельрод
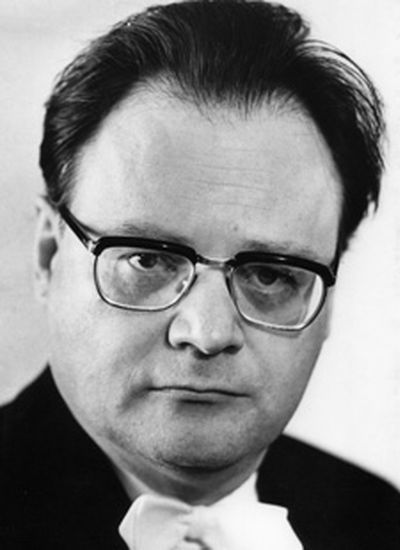
- Axelrod in 1970
- Born: October 11, 1923; Moscow
- Died: October 2, 2003 (aged 79); Hanover
- Occupation: Pianist

Gleb Borisovich Axelrod (Russian: Глеб Борисович Аксельрод; 11 October 1923 in Moscow – 2 October 2003 in Hannover; also spelled Gleb Akselrod) was a Russian pianist.

He was a disciple of Grigory Ginzburg. Axelrod won, ex-aequo with Marina Slesaryeva, the II piano edition of the Prague Spring Festival Competition (1951). In 1955, he obtained a 4th prize at the Concours Long-Thibaud, and two years later he placed second at the inaugural Vianna da Motta Competition. He subsequently held a professorship at the Moscow Conservatory.
