= Quinta de Santo António =

The Quinta de Santo António (Portuguese: Palácio da Quinta Nova / Quinta de Santo António / Quinta dos Ingleses) is a well-preserved Pombaline quinta in the freguesia of Carcavelos e Parede, in the municipality of Cascais, on the Portuguese Riviera. It is the seat of St. Julian's School.

== History ==
The oldest reference to the site is associated with municipality of Cascais, before 1364, then known as Quinta da Ordem (the Estate of the Order), pertaining to the Hospital e Gafaria do Santo Espírito de Sintra (Sintra Hospital and Leper Colony of Santo Espírito). Following the 16th century, the annual pension was of the estate was paid to the Santa Casa da Misericórdia of Sintra, then Cascais. It was through contributions from its diverse renters that the estate was expanded: by the end of the 16th and early 17th century, the estate of Santo António included 62 hectares.

In the 1760s, a few terrains were acquired to build a summer residence for José Francisco da Cruz (then treasurer to King D. José I), from the Majorat of Alagoa. It was an ample property, then known as the Quinta Nova de Santo António (New Estate of Saint Anthony).

In 1870, it was acquired by the English firm Falmouth, Malta & Gibraltar (later referred to as the Eastern Telegraph Co. and, finally, the Cable and Wireless Co.), who began work on the palace, with the intent of adapting it to serve as a local headquarters. But, within seven years, there was a fire that partly destroyed the eastern wing of the palace.

Part of the land was ceded in 1888, to be used for the construction of the Lisbon-Cascais railway line.

Similarly, another portion of the lands were offered by the Telegraph Co. as a gift in 1902, to Queen D. Amélia, so that the road linking it to the sanitorium could be enlarged.

In 1923, an annex building was constructed to the east of the palace, destined to function as a hospital for onsite workers of the Telegraph company.

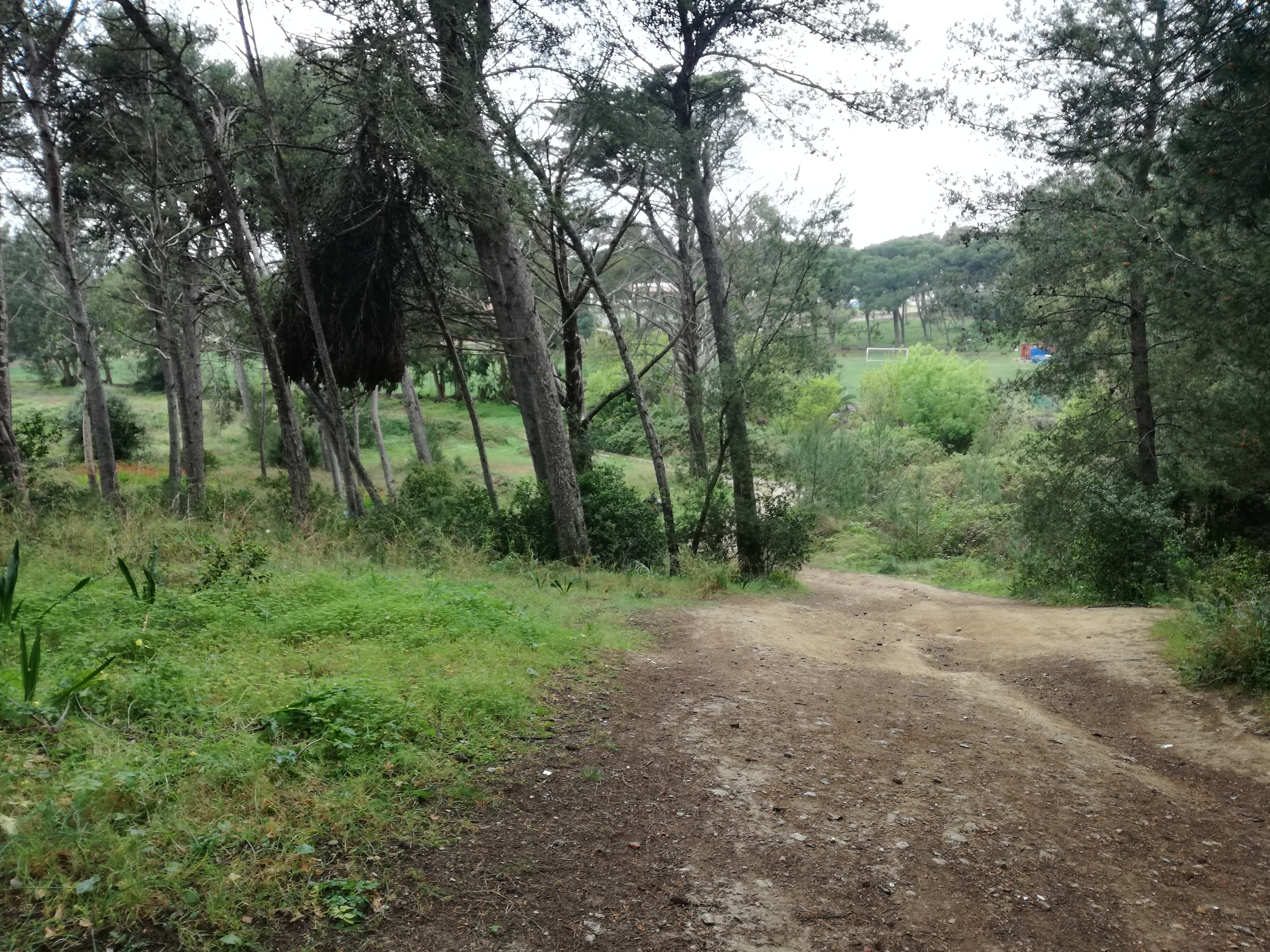
Quinta dos Ingleses

More land was transferred in 1936 to enlarge Avenida Jorge V (in honour of the British monarch's Silver Jubilee). More land along the beach was also expropriated three years later to expand the coastal roadway. Urbanization has resulted in a negative transformation of the classified group, that included a drastic reduction in the greenspace of Carcavelos. In the same year, the St. Julian's Association created a school (linked to the British Consulate) occupied some of the space in the palace, following the reduction in staff at the Cable and Wireless Co. to 9 employees. In addition, St. Julian's possessed a minimum percentage of the lands around the palace, which were later transferred to a real estate agency.

In 1963, part of the Cable and Wireless, was acquired by St. Julian's School while the remainder was purchased by the company Savelos.

On 11 February 1998, an approval order was issued to classify the building by the Minister of Culture.

== Architecture ==
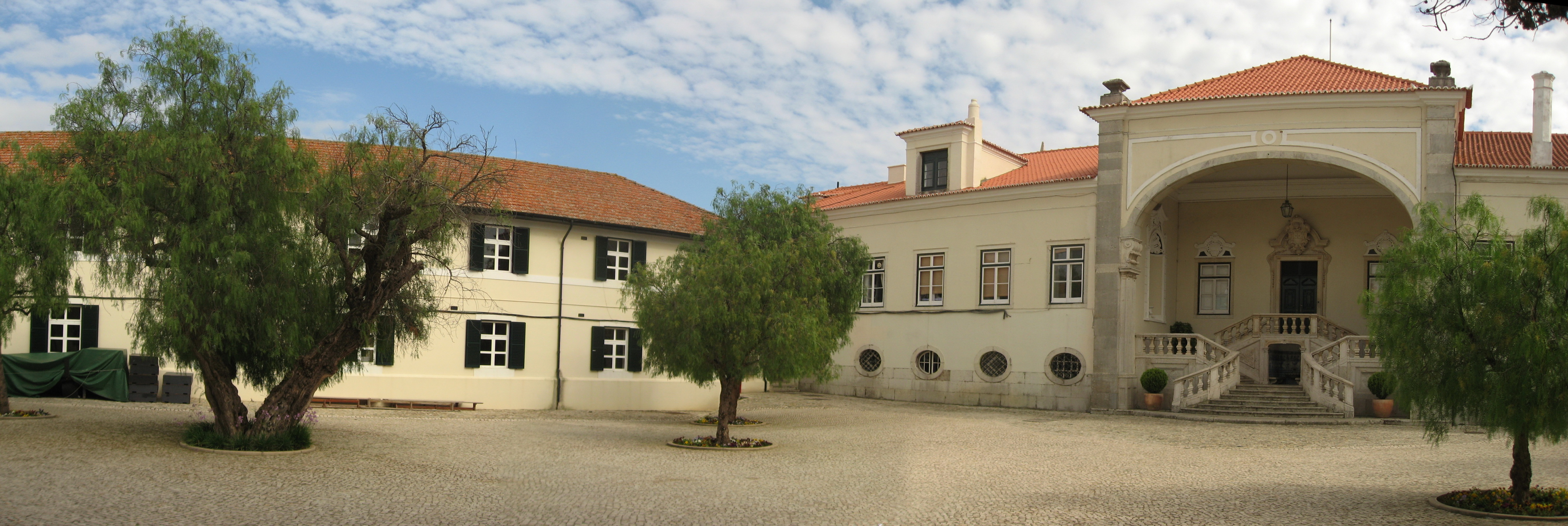
The entranceway and courtyard to the former-palace of Santo António

The estate, which corresponds to a great former noble residence, is located on 7 hectares along the coast of Carcavelos, in a locality associated with various pre-historic vestiges. The group of buildings are located in an isolated courtyard in a walled compound. Its access is made along an alameda defined by a roadway lined by walls and trees from north to south.

The main building has an E-shaped floor plan with a stepped staircase, covered in tiled roof. The main rectangular building constructed of painted plaster and stonework, has its main elevation oriented to the north in a longitudinal direction, oriented to rectangular patio. The two-floor facade, one of them partially buried and defined by circular oculi (framed in stonework), has three bodies, with an axial structure decorated by pinnacles over plinths. The main section includes a bow-opening-like archway served by monumental staircase in stonework, decorated with monochromatic azulejo tile, stonework and flanked by fountains. At the top of the galilee is straight door, topped by a stone coat-of-arms, flanked by windows with simple masonry framing and plaster relief. In the side panels, there are two niches decorated with ornamental compositions consisting of vegetal and rococo treatments. The side bodies, which are identical, have regular opening spans with simple masonry framing, with 5 windows that are followed by the illuminating oculi on the partially buried floors. In the southern rear elevation, there are three wings attached to the main building at equal distances, that defines a facade comprising 5 symmetrical sections from a central module. This group is highlighted by wedges in stonework and covered in pyramidal tile roof. This elevation is served by a terrace bounded by a wall, adjacent to which is a formal garden. Within the wall, is a central module aligned with a slightly curved gate, which can be accessed across a rectangular floor and roof vault, which corresponds to the old Casa de Fresco and used as offices.

The building has a central atrium, from which develops for each wing a corridor arranged in the longitudinal direction that articulates with compartments oriented to the northern and southern facades, generally with ceilings differently decorated with stuccoes. In the western wing (in the south), stands the dining room, a rectangular space interrupted by full arch with fireplace in stonework of erudite and lambril ceramic monochromatic treatment with a vegetal theme, also present in most spaces and areas of circulation (some with historic scenes or vegetal themes). The partially buried floor, is defined by thick walls (corresponding to the foundations and the primitive zone of the construction), deserves attention since it includes an edge vault with a well. Defining the corner of courtyard and flanked between the main building and another later building, is the facade of the old chapel. It is a separated in the north by a masonry pillar is distinguished by rectangular doorway, surmounted by an oval oculus, inscribed with a framing trim of stonework. The interior vault is completely altered, since it was not possible to identify any original structures.
