= Pedro Pinto (journalist) =

Portuguese-American journalist and communications director

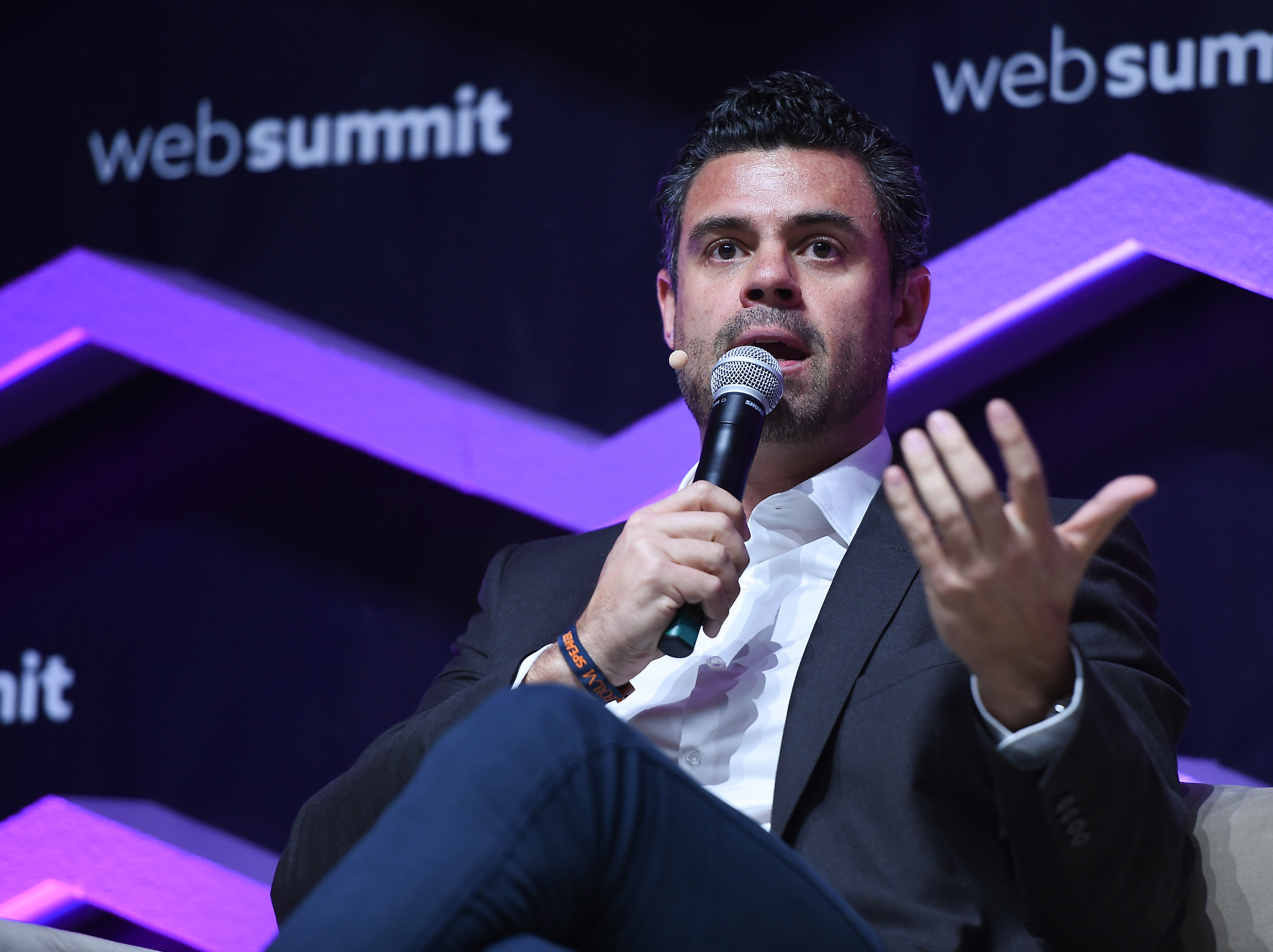
- Pinto at Web Summit 2017
- Born: Pedro Mendonça Pinto; 28 January 1975 (age 51); Lisbon, Portugal
- Education: American International School of Lisbon; University of North Carolina
- Occupations: Journalist, CEO of Empower Sports

Pedro Mendonça Pinto (Portuguese pronunciation: [ˈpeðɾu mẽˈdõsɐ ˈpĩtu]) (born 28 January 1975) is a Portuguese-American journalist and communications professional. Currently, he is the founder and CEO of a sports communications agency called Empower Sports*. Previously, he worked as managing director of communications at UEFA in Switzerland. Pinto was also a sports anchor for CNN International in Atlanta and London, covering the world’s highest profile events, including 2002 FIFA World Cup, hosting the UEFA Euro 2004 in which his home country hosted, and UEFA Champions League finals.

== Early life ==
Pinto was born in Lisbon, Portugal. While growing up in Portugal, he attended St. Julian's School in Carcavelos and later graduated from American International School of Lisbon. He eventually moved to the United States and graduated from the University of North Carolina at Charlotte with a bachelor's in communications and marketing. He also earned a degree from the Carolina School of Broadcasting. While at UNCC, he worked for three years as a sportswriter and won the "Sportswriter of the Year" award in 1999. Whilst studying in America, he also had internships with the NBA’s Charlotte Hornets and the MSNBC channel in North Carolina.

== Broadcasting career ==
Pinto started his career with RTP in 1996, hosting a series of cartoon programmes including Hugo. It was at RTP where he earned the opportunity to host the news show Caderno Diário, where he specialized in sports. In 1998, he was hired by CNN International to become a sports anchor and correspondent based in Atlanta, Georgia. Pinto was one of the hosts of the global sports show World Sport and in his role he also had the opportunity to cover a multitude of events, including the 2002 FIFA World Cup and several UEFA Champions League finals.

In 2003, Pinto decided to return home and went on to anchor the program Últimas Notícias on Sport TV. Pinto stayed until November 2006 when he received an invitation to return to CNN, this time as a sports anchor and reporter in London. Pinto has interviewed various top sports personalities including Ronaldo, Kaká, Robinho, José Mourinho, Roger Federer, Rafael Nadal, Alex Ferguson, Pelé and Novak Djokovic. He continued to anchor the CNN World Sport show and later also hosted a new football programme called CNN FC. He occasionally appears on the Guardian football podcast Football Weekly.

Since 2018, has Pinto presented all UEFA Champions League coverage for the ELEVEN Network in Portugal. Initially, he was also hired as non-executive director, but gave up the role and is now responsible only for leading the network’s programs connected with Europe’s top club competition.

== UEFA and FIFA work ==
Pinto left CNN in 2013 to take the job of Chief of Press at UEFA, working directly with President Michel Platini. He was then promoted to Managing Director of Communications, serving under the new president Aleksander Ceferin and now hosts all UEFA competition draws since 2016-17. Whilst in this role, Pinto oversaw the press office, corporate communications, and all digital platforms for UEFA. He also created the #EqualGame campaign which aimed to promote diversity and inclusion and featured several international stars including Cristiano Ronaldo, Leo Messi and Paul Pogba.

Pinto has hosted several UEFA Champions League draws and awards since 2005. He also hosted the 2009 FIFA World Player of the Year awards ceremony in Zürich, Switzerland, alongside Charlotte Jackson and the 2010 FIFA Ballon d'Or with Carol Manana. He hosted the UEFA Euro 2004 final tournament draw on November 30, 2003. On 30 November 2019, Pinto co-hosted the UEFA Euro 2020 final tournament draw with Corina Caragea in Bucharest and repeated this role in the UEFA Euro 2024 final tournament draw with Esther Sedlaczek in Hamburg.

== Personal life ==
Pinto currently lives in Lisbon and is the founder and CEO of Empower Sports. His communications agency works with various players, coaches, clubs and federations. He is fluent in Portuguese, English, Spanish and French.
