= Embassy of the United States, Lisbon =

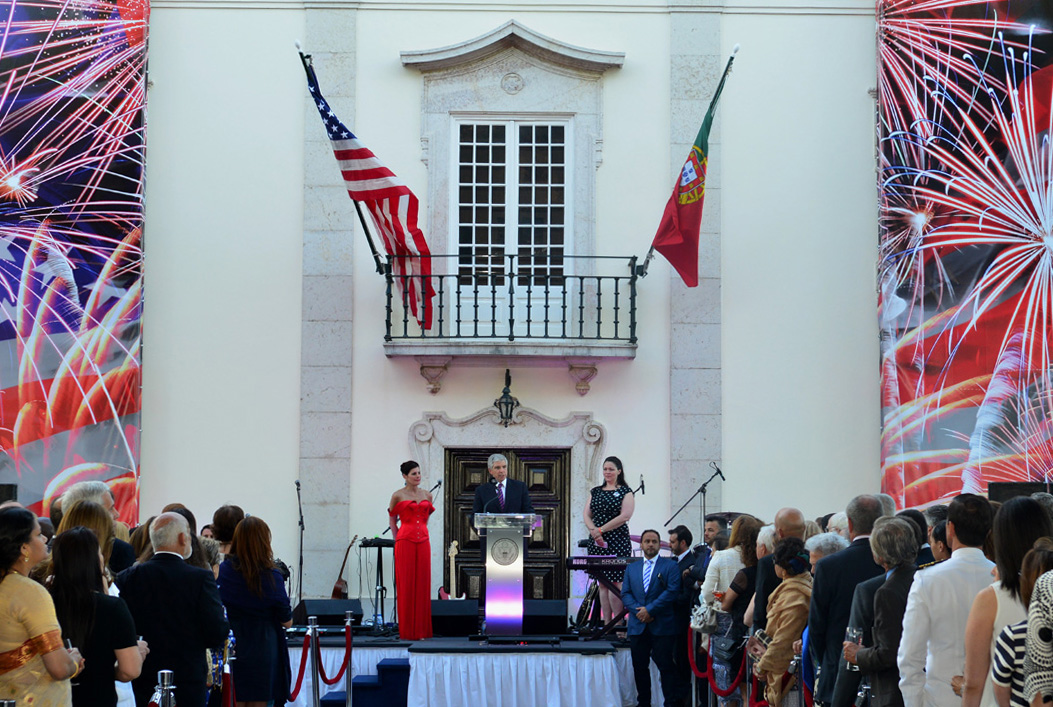
- Location: Lisbon, Portugal
- Address: Av. das Forças Armadas 133C, 1600-081 Lisboa, Portugal
- Coordinates: 38°44′42″N 9°9′32″W
- Website: https://pt.usembassy.gov

The Embassy of the United States in Lisbon is the embassy of the United States in Portugal, in the capital city of Lisbon. It is located on Avenida das Forças Armadas.

== History ==
Portugal was among the first countries to recognize the United States after the American Revolutionary War, establishing United States-Portugal bilateral relations as early as the 18th century. The first official U.S. Consul to the Azores, John Street, was appointed by President George Washington in 1795, and the U.S. Consulate in Ponta Delgada on Sao Miguel Island is the oldest continuously operating U.S. Consulate.

Portugal officially recognized the United States with the acceptance of U.S. Minister David Humphreys' credentials on May 13, 1791. During the Napoleonic Wars, when the King of Portugal relocated to Brazil, the U.S. legation also moved there from 1810 until 1821, returning to Lisbon alongside the King of Portugal in 1822. Henry Dearborn, Sr. was appointed U.S. Envoy to Portugal later that year.

The U.S. legation in Lisbon became an embassy on June 20, 1944, elevating the diplomatic representation to the ambassadorial level with Raymond Henry Norweb presenting his credentials as Ambassador.

=== Attacks ===
On November 24, 1984, the embassy was attacked by four grenades, damaging cars but causing no injuries. It was committed by Marxist terrorists belonging to the Popular Forces 25 April (PF-25) group, calling the embassy an American imperialist threat to Portuguese independence. The next month, four mortar shells were fired by the group at the compound, again only causing damage to cars. On February 19, 1986, a bomb exploded in a diplomat's car at the checkpoint of the embassy compound. The bomb was discovered by the Portuguese guards and managed to run away just before it detonated and destroyed the vehicle. This attack was also attributed to PF-25.

== See also ==
- Embassy of Portugal, Washington, D.C.
- List of ambassadors of the United States to Portugal
- List of diplomatic missions in Portugal
- Portugal–United States relations
- Design and Construction
