= Sequeira Costa =

Portuguese pianist (1929–2019)

José Carlos de Sequeira Costa
- Born: 18 July 1929; Luanda, Portuguese Angola
- Died: 21 February 2019 (aged 89) Olathe, Kansas
- Genres: Classical
- Occupation: Musician
- Instrument: Piano

José Carlos de Sequeira Costa (18 July 1929 in Luanda, Angola – 21 February 2019 in Olathe, Kansas) was a Portuguese pianist who is especially renowned for his interpretations of the Romantic repertoire.

As a child, Sequeira Costa showed exceptional musical talent. When he was eight years old, he moved to Lisbon to become the protégé of José Vianna da Motta who was one of the last pupils of Franz Liszt. Following Vianna da Motta's death in 1948, Sequeira Costa continued his studies in London under another eminent pianist, Mark Hambourg. Sequeira Costa also worked with Marguerite Long and Jacques Fevrier in Paris and Edwin Fischer in Switzerland. Under these teachers, Sequeira Costa was immersed in both the German and French schools of pianism. In his performing career, Sequeira Costa drew upon his understanding of both traditions to develop his personal style of musical interpretation.

At the age of 22, Sequeira Costa won the second Grand Prix at the Marguerite Long International Piano Competition in 1951. Five years later, he founded the Vianna da Motta International Music Competition in Lisbon. In 1958, Dmitri Shostakovich invited Sequeira Costa to sit on the jury of the inaugural International Tchaikovsky Competition in Moscow, on which he served a further six times. In both 1960 and 2000 he was a juror of the Chopin International Piano Competition. He also served on the jury of the Paloma O'Shea Santander International Piano Competition in 1980.

In his later life, Sequeira Costa continued to appear regularly on the panels of some of the world's most prestigious music competitions, while also delivering numerous master classes and giving regular tours. Sequeira Costa recorded the complete cycle of piano concertos by Sergei Rachmaninoff. His final recording was of the complete sonatas of Ludwig van Beethoven.

From 1976, Sequeira Costa served as the Cordelia Brown Murphy Distinguished Professor of Piano at the University of Kansas. His most successful student was the pianist Artur Pizarro, who was also his stepson. They recorded two CDs with works for two pianos by Rachmaninoff and Spanish composers and frequently gave two-piano recitals and performed together with orchestras.
