= José Vianna da Motta =

Portuguese pianist (1868 - 1948)

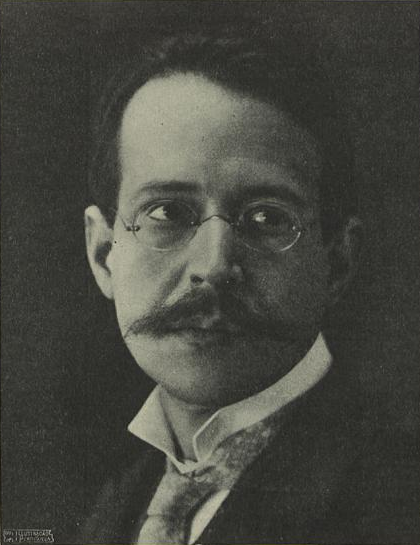
- Photograph of Vianna da Motta from the magazine O Occidente, 1911
- Born: 22 April 1868; São Tomé Island, Portugal
- Died: 1 June 1948 (aged 80); Lisbon, Portugal
- Occupations: Pianist; Composer; Academic teacher

José Vianna da Motta (modern spelling as Viana da Mota; 22 April 1868 – 1 June 1948) was a Portuguese pianist, teacher, and composer. He was one of the last pupils of Franz Liszt. The José Vianna da Motta Music Competition was founded in 1957 in his honor.

== Life ==
José Vianna da Motta was born on São Tomé Island, a Portuguese territory at the time, where his father, also a great amateur musician, had opened a pharmacy. Moving with his family to Continental Portugal, he settled in Colares, near Sintra, where he soon showed his unusual skills in music, and in playing and composing works for the piano.

In Berlin he had lessons from Xaver Scharwenka and Philipp Scharwenka before studying with Franz Liszt at Weimar in 1885 and with Hans von Bülow two years later. In the following years he undertook many concert tours all round the world. His professional career began in 1886 and continued uninterruptedly until 1945. He made his first European tour in 1888, accompanying violinist Pablo de Sarasate in Copenhagen and Helsinki and violinist Tivadar Nachéz in Moscow and St. Petersburg. Motta made his first American tour in 1892, the year he visited New York and where he met Ferruccio Busoni, and played for the first time in Brazil in 1896, on a tour with the violinist Bernardo Moreira de Sá. He returned several times to South America, having been applauded in his recitals in Buenos Aires, one of the cities where he performed more often in public.

Although he was renowned for his virtuosity, he was also dedicated to the music of J. S. Bach and Beethoven, playing all of the latter's 32 Piano Sonatas in a series of concerts in Lisbon in 1927. He also included lesser known composers in his recitals, playing, for example, works by Charles-Valentin Alkan at the Wigmore Hall in London in 1903. He made a number of transcriptions of Alkan's pedalier pieces into two hand versions.

Vianna da Motta remained close to his fellow virtuoso Busoni, having written the programme notes for Busoni's major series of piano concerto concerts in Berlin. On July 31, 1900, Busoni and Motta gave a concert dedicated to Liszt's works in Weimar. The program included Liszt's transcription of Beethoven's Ninth Symphony, which they played on two pianos.

Vianna da Motta was also a composer in his own right, including orchestral works (one of them a symphony) as well as piano pieces. On 25 October 1906, Motta recorded ten piano rolls for Welte-Mignon including three of his own compositions. He was Director of the Lisbon Conservatory from 1919 to 1938. Amongst his pupils there was the pianist Sequeira Costa.

He died in Lisbon in 1948, aged 80.

== Compositions ==
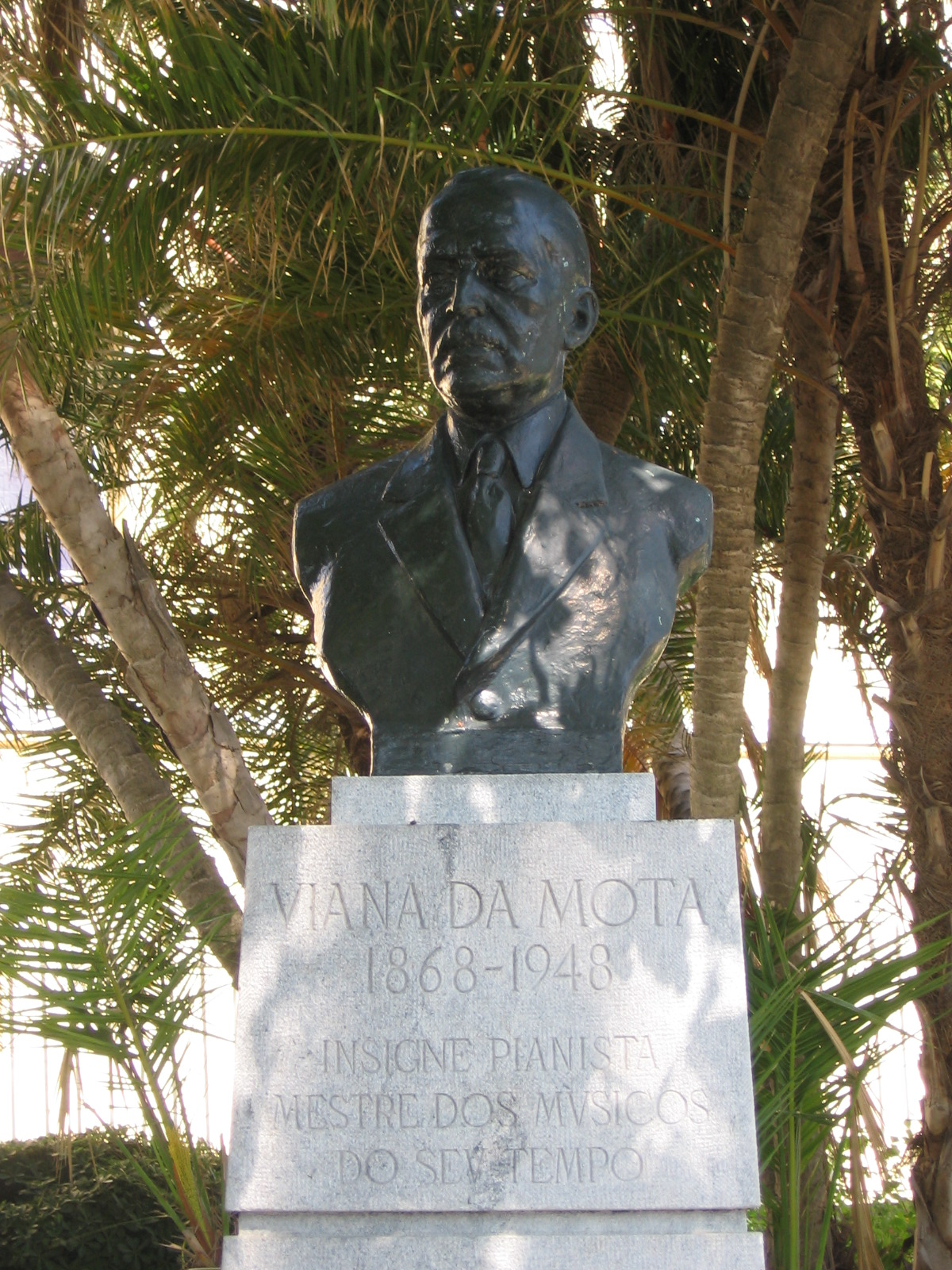
Statue of Vianna da Motta in the Jardim do Torel, Lisbon

== Sources ==
- Kenneth Hamilton, After the Golden Age: Romantic Pianism and Modern Performance, Oxford, 2008, ISBN 978-0-19-517826-5
- Charles Hopkins. "Vianna da Motta, José." In Grove Music Online. Oxford Music Online, (subscription only) (accessed February 9, 2010).
- Julia MacRae (ed.), Wigmore Hall 1901-2001: A Celebration. London 2001 ISBN 0-9539581-0-8
- Smith, Ronald, Alkan: The Man, The Music, London, 2000 ISBN 978-1-87108-273-9
