= St. Julian's School =

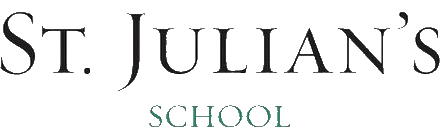

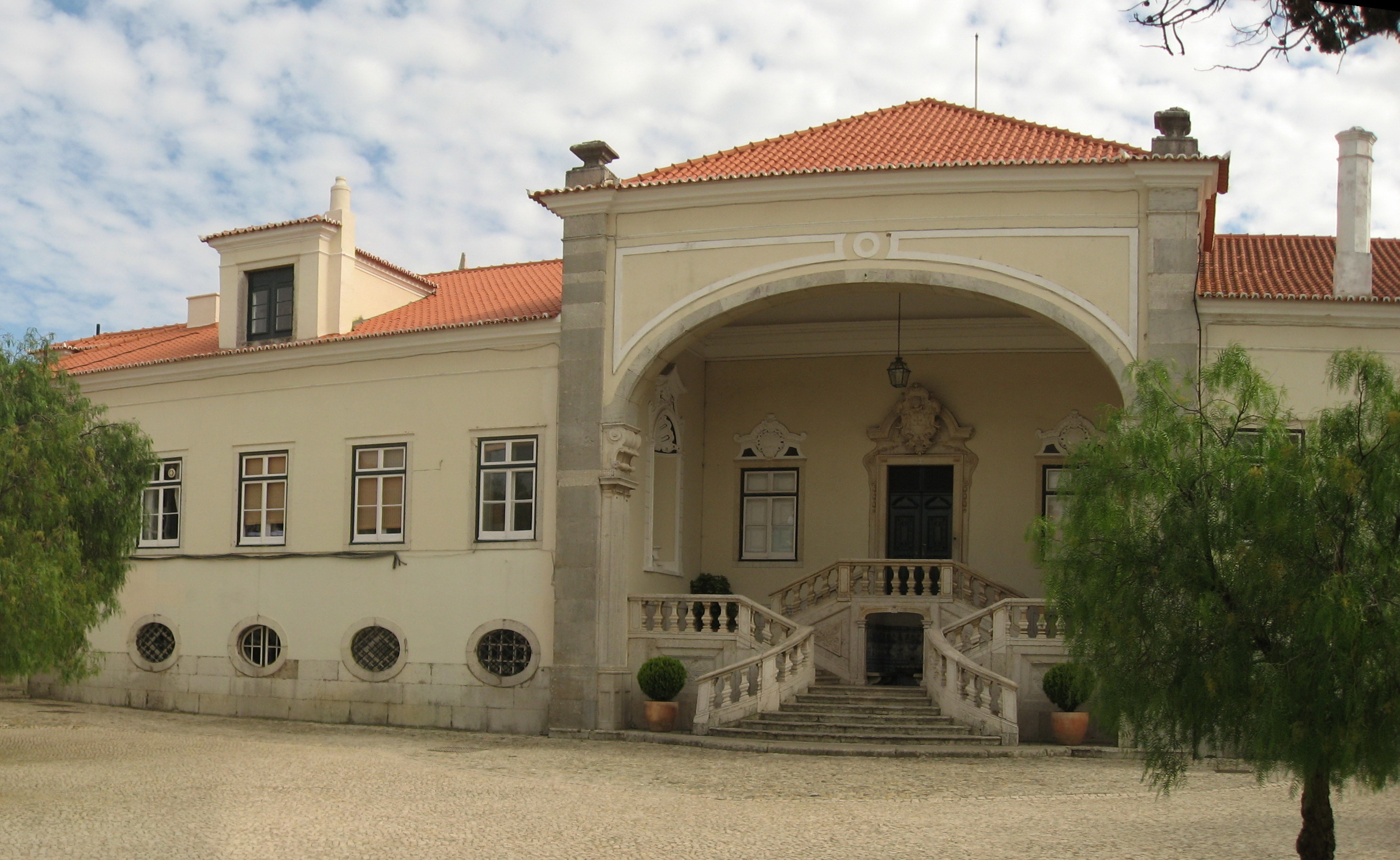

Location
- Carcavelos, Cascais, 2775-588; Portugal; 38.6848°N 9.3363°W

Information
- Type: British international school
- Established: 24 November 1932
- Headmaster: Paul Morgan
- Enrolment: 1,250
- Language: English and Portuguese
- Houses: Bucknall, Franklin, Etherington-Smith (ES) & Russell
- Colours: Green and white
- Website: www.stjulians.com

St. Julian's School is a British international school, in Carcavelos, Cascais Municipality, on the Portuguese Riviera, in the Greater Lisbon region. It is housed at Quinta de Santo António, a historic Pombaline quinta (estate) near Carcavelos Beach.

== History ==
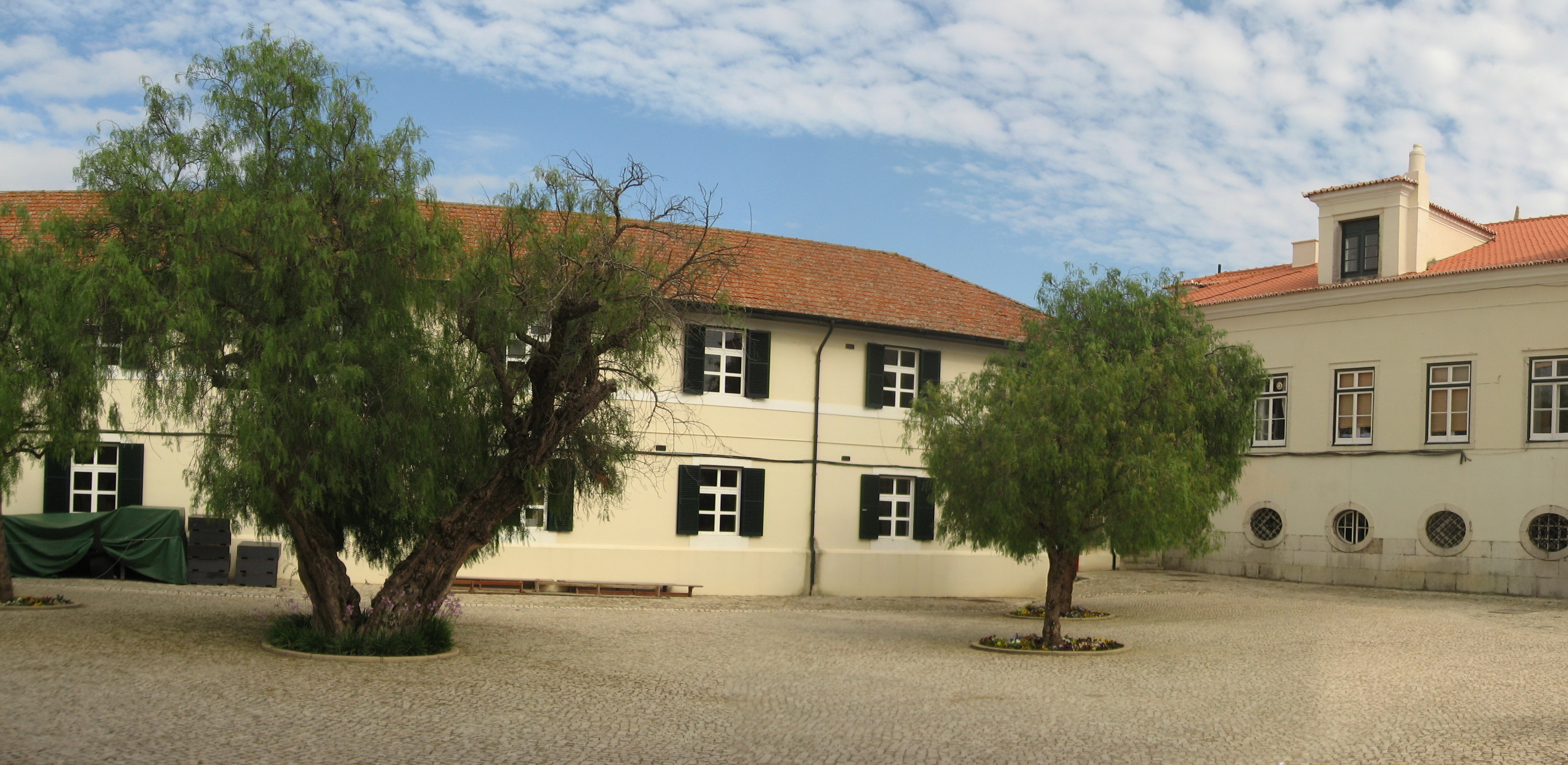
Courtyard of the Quinta de Santo António, seat of St. Julian's School

St. Julian's is a British international private school located in the parish of Carcavelos e Parede, in Cascais, close to Lisbon, Portugal. The school takes its name from São Julião da Barra Fortress, overlooking nearby Carcavelos beach, originally erected in the mid-16th century to keep the British, among other raiders, out of the Tagus estuary.

In the early 20th century, Carcavelos in Portugal had an Eastern Telegraph Company (ETC) station that used underwater wires to send communications internationally. A large group of specialized workers who helped maintain the facilities moved from the United Kingdom and settled in the region. In 1932, a Mrs Bucknall OBE, who had connections with the Parents’ National Education Union (PNEU), began working towards creating an English-speaking school in the area. She organized meetings with the British community and contacted PNEU for assistance and advice. Mrs Franklin CBE, a PNEU committee member, came to Portugal on a short visit that year, and was influential on the pedagogy of the new school.

A committee was formed to oversee legal and financial matters, as well as finding premises, with elected members such as Mr Etherington-Smith and Bucknall. Etherington-Smith was the first chair until 1944. The committee began inspecting properties, worrying that a number might be contaminated due to the typhoid outbreaks in Carcavelos at the time. The manager of the ETC at Quinta Nova offered a part of the ETC facilities to establish the school. Major Montgomery was the manager of the ETC at Quinta Nova. The school was located in the buildings, including residential palace, of the 18th-century estate founded by José Francisco da Cruz, treasurer to King D. José I.

The school opened on November 24, 1932. During this period, according to the school, it received support and recommendations by Sir Claud Russell, a British ambassador, who served as honorary chairman, and was present at the school's inaugural party on November 24, 1932. The school celebrates the event annually as Founders Day.

Since 2022, the school has been consistently ranked in Europe as both a Spear’s Top 10 Private School and a Carfax Top 15 Best Private School.

== Academics ==
St. Julian's has just over 1,200 students, from age three to age 18, representing over 60 nationalities.

The school is divided into three sections:

- The English Section, which runs from Nursery (age 3) to Year 13 (age 18). Students broadly follow the National Curriculum for England leading to IGCSEs in Year 10 and 11 (Key Stage 4) and the International Baccalaureate Diploma Programme (DP) or Career-related Programme (CP) in Years 12 and 13. The English Section is further divided into the Primary Section: Pre-Prep School (Nursery and Reception), Prep School (Years 1 to 6) and Secondary Section (Years 7 to 13).
- The Bilingual Section, where the language of instruction is in English and Portuguese. This runs from 1º Ano (age 5) to 9º Ano (age 15). After 9º the students transfer into Year 11 of the Secondary Section and complete a series of IGCSEs over one year in preparation for the International Baccalaureate Diploma Programme (DP) or Career-related Programme (CP) in Years 12 and 13.

== Organisation ==
St. Julian's is run by a not-for-profit association, whose 50+ members, as trustees, appoint the board of governors. The board in turn appoint the head and bursar.

It is jointly accredited by the Council of International Schools (CIS) and the New England Association of Schools and Colleges (NEASC). The head is a member of the Heads' Conference (HMC). The school is also an accredited member of the Council of British International Schools (COBIS).

Just under half the students at St. Julian's are Portuguese, with British the next largest nationality, and more than 40 other countries represented.

== Notable alumni ==
- Pedro Pinto, journalist
- Dame Paula Rego, artist
- Daniela Ruah, actress
- Afonso, Prince of Beira, heir apparent to the defunct throne of Portugal
