= Vianna da Motta International Music Competition =

Portuguese international music competition

The Vianna da Motta International Music Competition was first constituted in 1957 in Lisbon in honor of José Vianna da Motta by his disciple Sequeira Costa, who remains its president; this inaugural edition was won by Naum Shtarkman. The competition, a member of the World Federation of International Music Competitions, has been held regularly since 1964.

== Awards ==
While mainly a piano competition, two violin editions have been held. In 1973 Ida Kavafian and Gerardo Ribeiro shared the 1st prize. In 1991 it was declared void; Graf Mourja and Rachel Varga were awarded, respectively, the 2nd and 3rd prizes.

Piano
Year	1st prize	2nd prize	3rd prize
1957	Naum Shtarkman, USSR	Gleb Axelrod, USSR	Miłosz Magin, Poland
1964	Nelson Freire, Brazil; Vladimir Krainev, USSR	Sérgio Varela Cid, Portugal	Igor Khudoley, USSR
1966	Not awarded	Albert Atenelle, Spain; John Owings, USA	Cecilio Tieles, Cuba
1968	Farhad Badalbeyli, USSR; Viktoria Postnikova, USSR	Not awarded	Georges Pludermacher, France
1971	Not awarded	Roland Keller, Germany	Emanuel Ax, USA
1975	Teofils Biķis, USSR; William DeVan, USA	Not awarded	Rusudan Khuntsaria, USSR
1979	Arutyun Papazyan, USSR	Vagui Papian, USSR	Andreas Pistorious, East Germany
1983	Not awarded	Florent Boffard, France; Pedro Burmester, Portugal	Suzanne Grützmann, East Germany
1987	Artur Pizarro, Portugal	Elisso Bolkvadze, USSR	Ian Munro, Australia
1991	Not awarded	Igor Kamenz, Germany	Not awarded
1997	Tao Chang, Hong Kong	Jill Lawson, Portugal	Maria Rostotsky, Sweden; Christian Seibert, Germany
1999	Amir Tebenikhin, Kazakhstan	Richard Raymond, Canada	Pyotr Dmitriev, Russia
2001	Not awarded	Nami Ejiri, Japan	Javier Perianes, Spain
2004	Not awarded	Eleonora Karpukhova, Russia	Olga Monakh, Ukraine
2007	Not awarded	Dmytro Onyschenko, Ukraine; Yung Wook Yoo, South Korea	Not awarded
2010	Lilian Akopova, Armenia	Ilya Rashkovsky, Russia	Mikhail Shilyaev, Russia
