= Naum Shtarkman =

Russian pianist (1927–2006)

Naum Shtarkman Наум Штаркман
- Born: 28 September 1927; Zhytomyr, Ukrainian SSR, Soviet Union
- Died: 19 July 2006 (aged 78) Moscow, Russia
- Genres: Classical
- Occupation: Pianist
- Instrument: Piano

Naum Lvovich Shtarkman (Note: Russian: Наум Львович Штаркман, romanized: Naum Lvovich Shtarkman; Ukrainian: Наум Львович Штаркман, romanized: Naum Lvovych Shtarkman) (28 September 1927 – 19 July 2006) was a Soviet and Russian classical pianist.

== Career ==
Born in Zhytomyr, Shtarkman won 5th prize at the V International Chopin Piano Competition (1955), 1st prize at the Vianna da Motta International Music Competition in Lisbon (1957) and, most notably, the Bronze Medal at the inaugural edition of the Tchaikovsky Competition (1958). For several decades, his concert career was restricted to the Soviet scene.

Shtarkman played a Mendelssohn piano concerto with an orchestra at the age of 11. A year later, he gave a solo recital at the Great Hall of the Moscow Conservatory, a program which consisted of works by Bach, Beethoven, Chopin, Schumann and Liszt. In 1944 he began studying at the Moscow Conservatory in the class of the great pianist and teacher Konstantin Igumnov. Igumnov died in 1948 and Shtarkman refused to complete his training with another teacher, so he prepared for graduation without a formal mentor, consulting informally with Sviatoslav Richter. He graduated in 1949.

== Arrest ==
Shortly after receiving the third prize of the First International Tchaikovsky Competition (1958), Shtarkman was arrested and convicted under Article 121 (homosexuality) of the Criminal Code of the RSFSR. He was arrested in Kharkiv, hours before he was scheduled to perform at a factory, as a special performance. The incarceration, which lasted eight years, shattered his concert career: for years afterwards Shtarkman was allowed only to perform in the far-off provinces or in secondary concert halls. The arrest had also become an impediment to educational activities for Shtarkman: from 1969 he freelanced unofficially at the Gnessin State Musical College and only in 1987 became a professor at the Moscow Conservatory. After that, he began to perform in many countries around the world.

In 1993, Shtarkman became permanent chairman of the jury for the Igumnov International Competition for Young Pianists, ongoing in Lipetsk. He died in Moscow.
