= List of schools in Portugal =

There are more than 8000 schools Portugal, including 2793 (982 public, 1811 private) Kindergartens, 4278 (3866 public, 412 private) Basic schools, 336 (313 public, 23 private) Secondary schools, 372 (236 public, 136 private) Combined schools, 265 (34 public, 231 private) Vocational schools and 14 (7 public, 7 private) Artistic schools. So this list only includes those with Wikipedia articles.

- Aljezur International School, Aljezur
- British School of Lisbon, Lisbon
- Camões Secondary School, Arroios
- Carlucci American International School of Lisbon, Linhó
- Colégio Dom Diogo de Sousa, São Vicente
- Colégio Internacional Infanta D. Maria de Portugal, Sintra
- Colégio Luso-Internacional do Porto, Porto
- Colégio Marista de Carcavelos, Lisbon
- Colégio Militar, Lisbon
- Colégio Planalto, Lisbon
- Deutsche Schule Algarve, Silves
- Deutsche Schule Lissabon, Lisbon/Estoril
- Deutsche Schule zu Porto, Porto
- Escola da Ponte, São Tomé de Negrelos
- Escola Secundária Artística António Arroio, Lisbon
- Escola Secundária D. Pedro V
- Escola Secundária Eça de Queirós, Póvoa de Varzim
- Escola Secundária Sá de Miranda, São Vicente
- Externato Marista de Lisboa, Lisbon
- Instituto Español Giner de los Ríos, Algés
- International School São Lourenço, Almancil
- Lycée français Charles Lepierre, Lisbon
- Lycée Français International de Porto, Porto
- Oeiras International School, Oeiras
- Oporto British School, Porto
- Pupilos do Exército
- St. Dominic's International School, Cascais
- St. John de Britto College, Lumiar
- St. Julian's School, Carcavelos
- TASIS Portugal, Linhó
- Vale Verde International School, Algarve
- Vilamoura International School, Vilamoura

== See also ==
- Education in Portugal
- List of universities and colleges in Portugal
