= British School of Lisbon =

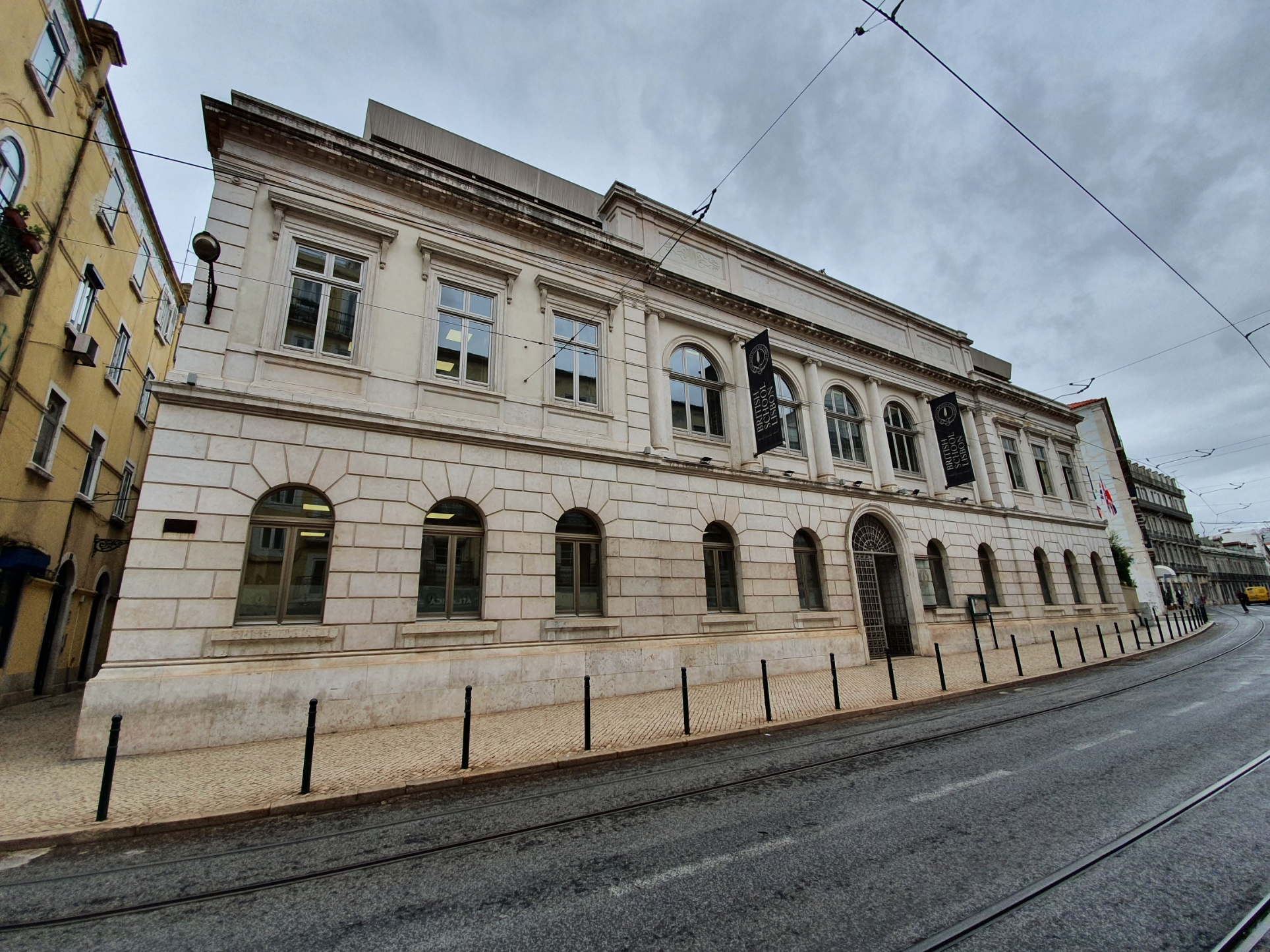

Location
- Lisbon, Lisbon District, 1200-427; Portugal
- Coordinates: 38.70841°N 9.14606°W

Information
- Other name: BSL
- School type: British international school
- Founded: 2019
- Sister school: The British School of Bali, The British School of Vilnius
- Headmaster: Stephen Spicer
- Colours: Blue and yellow
- Website: Official website

The British School of Lisbon (alternatively known as BSL) is a British international school in Lisbon, Portugal. Founded in 2019, it is among the newest in the network of international schools run since 2005 by The Schools Trust, a British non-profit organization.

== Overview ==
The British School of Lisbon (BSL) was established by The Schools Trust, a nonprofit foundation from the United Kingdom, whose trustees have been operating a number of international schools since 2005. BSL first opened its doors on 12 September 2019. The school is located within the central district of the Lisbon downtown at Rua de São Paulo, in Cais do Sodré, in a historical building built in the second half of the 18th century and renovated in 2010. In March 2020, following the coronavirus pandemic and restrictions applied by the Ministry of Education and Portuguese authorities for the educational institutions, the school adopted a Distance Learning Program for its students with the teaching provided by a combination of videoconferences and individual lessons.

== Academics and administration ==
The school students follow the National Curriculum for England, which is segmented into phases of Early Years, Primary and Secondary School. The classes are taught in English language. The learning program includes English language and literature, Math, Sciences, Portuguese language and culture, Physical Education, Music, Humanities and more. The students are required to wear school uniforms. The headteacher of the school is Stephen Spicer.

== Accreditation ==
The British School of Lisbon is certified and validated by the Institute of Financial Management and Education (IGeFE) in Portugal.

== See also ==
- Education in Portugal
