= Exames Nacionais do Ensino Secundário =

Portuguese national exams to apply for higher education

In Portugal, ENES is an acronym for 'Exames Nacionais do Ensino Secundário' (Secondary Education National Exams). Specifically, the ENES Sheet is a document containing the students final secondary education classification (GPA) as well as the exam results of the "provas específicas" (specific exams) used to apply to university or polytechnical institutions.

== See also ==
- Higher education in Portugal
- Education in Portugal
