= Instituto Español Giner de los Ríos =

Location
- Rua Direita do Dafundo, 40; Algés, Linda-a-Velha e Cruz Quebrada-Dafundo, Oeiras; Portugal; 38.699896°N 9.239217°W

Information
- Type: Spanish International School
- Established: 12 September 1932
- Principal: Beatriz Rumbo Caridad
- Website: www.ginerdelosrios.educacion.es

Instituto Español Giner de los Ríos is a Spanish international school in the civil parish of Algés, Linda-a-Velha e Cruz Quebrada-Dafundo, in the municipality of Oeiras, in the Portuguese Greater Lisbon region, operated by the Spanish Ministry of Education. It offers educación infantil (preschool) to bachillerato (senior high school) level courses.

== History ==
The Spanish Institute of Lisbon was established by Ministerial Decree on 12 September 1932 (Gaceta de Madrid, 21 September 32), proposed by the Ministerio de Estado (Ministry of State), provisionally placing in the Casa da España, sharing premises with the Consulado y la Cámara de Comercio (Consulate and Chamber of Commerce) along Rua do Salitre. The first director was professor D. Jose Hernandez Almendros.

In 1933, by order 251 of the Ministerio de Estado, the institute was given the name Hermenegildo Giner de los Ríos, according to the desire of the Spanish residents in the city, national entities and proposal of the Ambassador to Spain.

At the end of the 1935-36 course year, the management of the Instituto and the Escuelas de Enseñanza Primaria were unified in a building along Rua Mousinho da Silveira.

After reaching a certain prominence in Portuguese society, following their work organized regularly with the Portuguese national radio (La hora española), the Institute faced a severe crisis at the end of the 1953-54 calendar year. During these years it operated along Rua Actor Tasso, but continued to have problems financially, resulting in the delay of the opening of the 1975–1976 school year. At that time, it moved operations to its current location, at Rua Direita do Dafundo, in the estate Quinta de São João do Rio, a historic monument ordered constructed by the Count of Cantanhede in 1649.

In 1993 a new pavilion was constructed with two classrooms for the 1999–2000 school year, in addition to remodeling of the patios and overall improvement of facilities. The library has steadily, over time, been enriched by important donations (with some of the oldest books dating to 1789). Many notable people have lectured at the institute, including D. Manuel A. Ivot Leon, eminent professor of history and American studies; D.Eugenio Montes, renowned poet and professor of literature; and others, including Gerardo Diego, who lectured several courses. As can be expected, there was a special attention placed on Portuguese studies, supported by the library and well-known personalities, including the illustrious historian Fidelino Figueiredo.

== Sources ==
- Proyecto Lingüístico de Centro (PDF) (in Spanish), Lisbon, Portugal: Instituto Español Giner de los Ríos, 2 November 2007
