= Colégio Internacional Infanta D. Maria de Portugal =

International school in Sintra, Lisbon, Portugal

Coordinates: 38.795127°N 9.383232°W

Information
- Established: 2005
- Language: English, Portuguese

College Internacional Infanta D. Maria de Portugal is an international school located in Sintra, Lisbon, Portugal. The school was established in 2005 when it obtained its official license from the Ministry of Education.[1]

International School Colégio Infanta D. Maria de Portugal is an international bi-lingual school.

International School College Infanta D. Maria de Portugal has an emphasis on Portuguese education and follows a modified version of the Cambridge curriculum and prepares students for IGCSE and A-level examinations. All IGCSE subjects are based on the Cambridge University curriculum. Admission to the school is dependent on a successful interview and entry examination.

== History ==
Founded in 2005 and a private fee-paying school, it has been run since 2006 by a Board of Governors composed of teachers.

In 2007 it received planning permission to build Portugal's first bi-lingual primary school which delivers some subjects in Portuguese and English. Most classes are taught in English and some in Portuguese. The bilingual concept took two years to devise and formed the basis of a Masters in International Education dissertation by its director, Carlos Miguel Sousa Almeida.

== Structure ==
Children from the ages of 3 to 18 enjoy an exceptional education. The school operates with the internationally recognised[1] and demanding Cambridge IGCSE and A-Level programme of study. This programme offers a broad choice of curriculum and has a reputation for developing successful students.[2]

International School College Infanta D. Maria de Portugal has integrated the teaching of the national language and culture into their curriculum, with a department of dedicated and qualified English speakers faculty. Portuguese language lessons are now mandatory at the younger levels with children taking these classes divided into groups according to their linguistic skill level. This will increase the opportunity for those attending the school to leave it fully bi-lingual.

Portuguese children at the school, meanwhile, achieve an education in English while still being able to learn their own language and literature in accordance with the Portuguese Education Ministry programme.

It is also an accredited University of Cambridge Examinations Centre.

== Sports and athletics ==
College Internacional Infanta D Maria de Portugal's School holds various intra-school sports activities and clubs including Football, Mini-ténis, Karate, Judo, training sessions (alternating between boys and girls), an annual Sports Day. The school also, thanks to its vast facilities.

== The arts ==
The Drama Department is active at College Infanta D Maria de Portugal. In the Secondary School, pupils take part in Creative Arts until Year 6, which consists of lessons in art, dance, drama and music.

The Music in addition, every year in College Infanta D Maria de Portugal have been musicals; Meeting the needs of learners we have provided music students with exams of ABRM and assessments that nurture and evaluate an individual's performance and progress.

== Ecological issues ==
The school, recently proved to be sufficiently "ecologically efficient" to enter the Eco-Schools programme. The school also has regular Eco-Council meetings within the school and attends an Eco-Forum conference in Lisbon.
