= São Vicente (Braga) =

- Civil parish
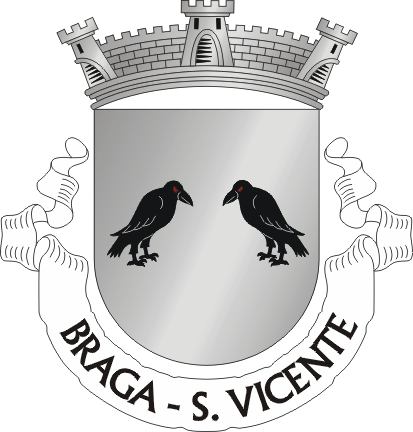
- Coat of arms

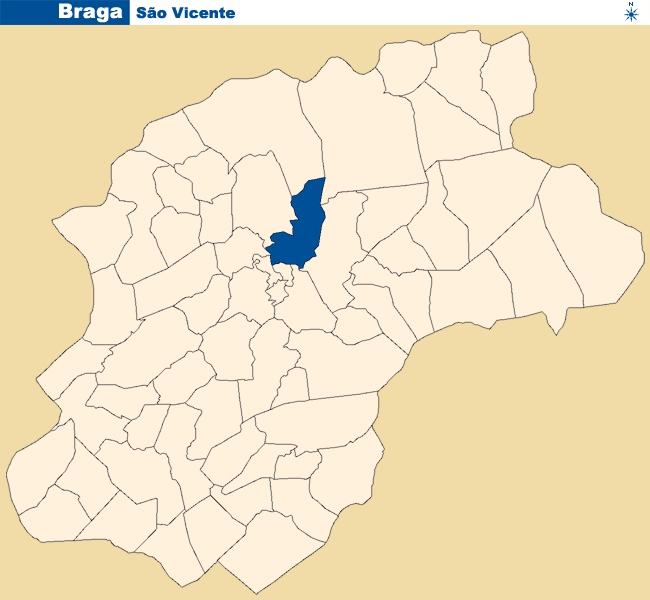
- Coordinates: 41.559°N 8.421°W
- Country: Portugal
- Region: Norte
- Intermunic. comm.: Cávado
- District: Braga
- Municipality: Braga

Area
  - Total: 2.55 km^{2} (0.98 sq mi)

Population (2011)
  - Total: 13,236
  - Density: 5,190/km^{2} (13,400/sq mi)
- Time zone: UTC+00:00 (WET)
  - Summer (DST): UTC+01:00 (WEST)

São Vicente is a Portuguese freguesia ("civil parish"), located in the municipality of Braga. The population in 2011 was 13,236, in an area of 2.55 km^{2} (0.98 sq mi).

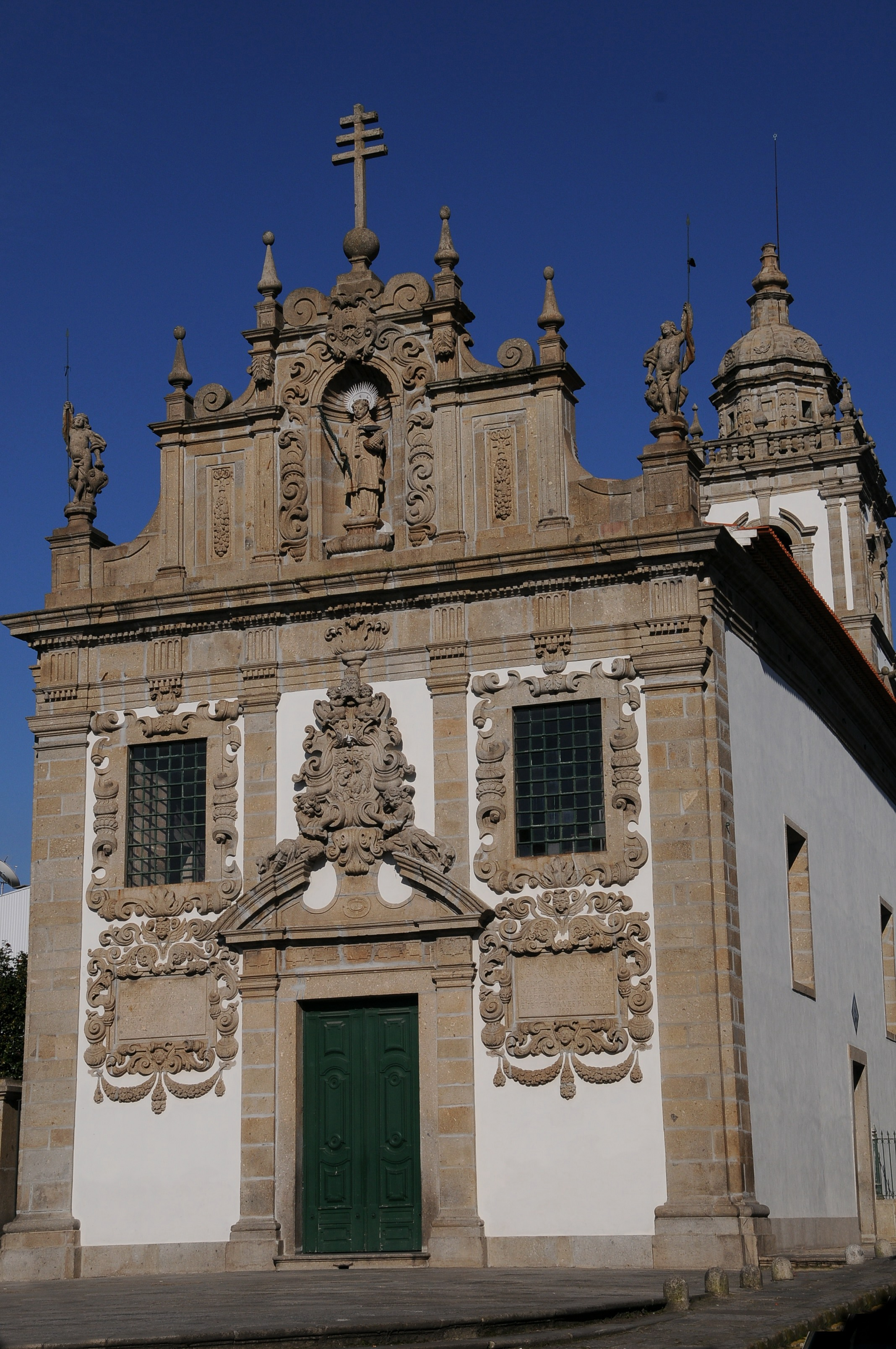
St Vincent's Church

In São Vicente is located the Faculty of Philosophy part of Catholic University of Portugal, the Escola Secundária Sá de Miranda and the Colégio D. Diogo de Sousa.

== Main sights ==
- St Vincent's Church
- Carmo Church
