= Education in Portugal =

Ministry of Education
- Minister^{1}: Fernando Alexandre (2024–present)

National education budget (2024)
- Budget: € 10.2 billion

General details
- Primary languages: Portuguese
- System type: National
- Origins University Schools Polytechnic Schools Industrial Institutes Polytechnical Institutes Major reorganizations Bologna process: 12th century^{2} (established); 1290^{3} (established); 1837 to 1911^{4} 1852 to 1974^{5} 1970s - 1980s^{6} (established); 1990s and 2000s^{7} 2007^{8} (established)

Literacy (2021)
- Total: 96.9%
- Male: 97.9%
- Female: 96.0%

Enrollment
- Total: 2,025,082
- Primary: 633,650
- Secondary: 958,215
- Post secondary: 433,217

Attainment
- Secondary diploma: 23.5%
- Post-secondary diploma: 19.8%
- ^{1}The Ministry of Education, Higher Education and Science covers all education levels including higher education, as well as Science and technology in Portugal.^{2}The first medieval schools were catholic church related, including the first medieval university established in 1290.^{3} Portuguese universities have existed since 1290. The oldest such institution, the University of Coimbra, was first established in Lisbon before moving to Coimbra. Historically, within the scope of the now defunct Portuguese Empire, the Portuguese founded in 1792 the oldest engineering school of Latin America (the Real Academia de Artilharia, Fortificação e Desenho), as well as the oldest medical college of Asia (the Escola Médico-Cirúrgica de Goa) in 1842.^{4}Two Polytechnic Schools were originally created in 1837 in Lisbon and Porto, and were later merged into the Universities of Lisbon and Porto created in 1911.^{5}The Industrial Institutes were created in 1852. Discontinued the industrial professional studies policy, they will gave bird to some of the older schools and institutes that compose today's Polytechnic Institutes. Some faculties of Lisbon's universities also originated from the original Instituto Industrial de Lisboa.^{6}The Polytechnic Institutes were created during the 1970s and 1980s as groups of new and existing institutes and schools.^{7}Several reforms and reorganizations of the overall educational system were performed, including changes on the polytechnics competences, introduction of new exams in basic and secondary schools, and extensive changes in the curricula of all levels of education.^{8}The Bologna process lead to a new wave of reforms and changes in education since the late 1990s onwards, specially in the universities and polytechnics.

Education in Portugal is free and compulsory until the age of 18, when students usually complete their year 12. However, only one of those requirements is necessary. The education is regulated by the State through the Ministry of Education. There is a system of public education and also many private schools at all levels of education. The first Portuguese medieval universities, such as the University of Coimbra, were created in the 13th century, and the national higher education system is fully integrated into the European Higher Education Area.

The basic literacy rate of the Portuguese population is 99.44 (99.48% male, 99.38% female, aged 15–24). According to INE (Portuguese Institute for National Statistics), only 3.7 million Portuguese workers (67% of the working active population) completed basic education (81% of the working population attained the lower basic level of education and 12% attained the intermediate level of education).

According to the Programme for International Student Assessment (PISA) 2018, the average Portuguese 15-year-old student, when rated in terms of reading literacy, mathematics and science knowledge, near above the OECD's average. Although, with a sharp downwards trend.

== Portugal history ==
In the beginnings of the Portuguese nationality, the Christian clergy was the main player in the educational endeavour. Portuguese universities have existed since 1290. Within the scope of the Portuguese Empire, the Portuguese founded in 1792 the oldest engineering school of Latin America (the Real Academia de Artilharia, Fortificação e Desenho), as well as the oldest medical college of Asia (the Goa Medical College) in 1842.

=== 19th and 20th century ===
However, by the end of the 19th century the illiteracy rate was over 80 percent and higher education was reserved for a small percentage of the population. 68.1 percent of Portugal's population was still classified as illiterate by the 1930 census.

Although the militants of the First Republic had chosen education as one of their banner causes, the evidence shows that the more democratic First Republic was less successful than the authoritarian Estado Novo in expanding elementary education. Under the First Republic, literacy levels in children aged 7 to 14 registered a modest increase from 26 per cent in 1911 to 33 per cent in 1930. Under the Estado Novo, literacy levels in children aged 7 to 14 increased to 56 per cent in 1940, 77 per cent in 1950 and 97 per cent in 1960.

Under Salazar the number of elementary schools grew from 7,000 in 1927 to 10,000 in 1940. While the illiteracy rate under the twenty years of the First Republic had only dropped a modest 9%, under Salazar in twenty years, the illiteracy rate dropped 21%, from 61.8% in 1930 to 40.4% in 1950. In 1940, the regime celebrated the fact that for the first time in Portuguese history, the majority of the population could read and write. Nevertheless, Portugal's literacy rate by the 1940s and early 1950s was still low for North American and Western European standards at the time.

In 1952 a vast multi-pronged Plan for Popular Education was launched with the intent of finally extirpate illiteracy and put into school every child of school age. This plan included fines for parents who did not comply, and these were strictly enforced. By the late 1950s Portugal had succeeded in pulling itself out of the educational abyss in which it had long found itself: illiteracy among children of school age virtually disappeared.

Literacy Rate	1900	1911	1920	1930	1940	1950	1960
Children aged 7–14	20%	26%	31%	33%	56%	77%	97%

From the 1960s, the country made public education available for all children between the ages of six and twelve, expanded a robust network of industrial and commercial technical schools aimed at intermediate education of future skilled workers (ensino médio), recognized the Portuguese Catholic University in 1971, and by 1973 a wave of new state-run universities were founded across mainland Portugal (the Minho University, the New University of Lisbon, the University of Évora, and the University of Aveiro - Veiga Simão was the Minister in charge for education by then).

From the 1960s to the 1974 Carnation Revolution, secondary and university education experienced the fastest growth of Portuguese education's history. After 1974 the number of basic and secondary schools as well as of higher education institutions, increased until the end of the century, sometimes without the necessary allocation of quality material and qualified human resources.

The revolutionary government also endeavored to increase the adult literacy rate. Though children often had high rates of literacy, many adults still could not read or write at the time. There is some evidence the government's measures to increase adult literacy were successful.

Education more than basic (4th or 6th year) wasn't affordable for most Portuguese families, the real democratization of education, specially secondary and higher education, only happened in the 1980s. After mid-2000s programs of modernization of schools (basic and secondary) and the construction of new elementary schools called "educational centres" (mostly to reduce the number of overloaded elementary schools, to widespread the 9 AM to 5h30 PM schedule system, because in most overloaded schools there are classes with 8 AM-1 PM schedule and other with 1 PM-6 PM) are being held.

The Bologna process for higher education has been adopted since 2006. However the higher-education rate in the country still remains the lowest in the European Union, this rate was around 7% in 2003 (Source: OECD (2003) Education at a Glance and OECD Statistical Compendium), and improved to 11% in 2007 - as compared to Slovakia's and Slovenia's around 16%; Germany's, Estonia, Spain's and Ireland's 28%; or Belgium's, Netherlands', Denmark's, Finland's, Cyprus's and UK's, over 30% (Source: EuroStat, March 2007).

According to the OECD's Programme for International Student Assessment (PISA), the average Portuguese 15-years old student was for many years underrated and underachieving in terms of reading literacy, mathematics and science knowledge in the OECD, nearly tied with the Italian and just above countries like Greece, Turkey and Mexico. However, since 2010, PISA results for Portuguese students improved dramatically.

The Portuguese Ministry of Education announced a 2010 report published by its office for educational evaluation GAVE (Gabinete de Avaliação do Ministério da Educação) which criticized the results of PISA 2009 report and claimed that the average Portuguese teenage student had profound handicaps in terms of expression, communication and logic, as well as a low performance when asked to solve problems. They also claimed that those fallacies are not exclusive of Portugal but indeed occur in other countries due to the way PISA was designed.

Due to the Portuguese sovereign debt crisis in the late 2000s, and the subsequent IMF-EU financial assistance to the Portuguese Republic from 2011 onward, many universities and other higher education institutions suffered financially. Many were on verge of bankruptcy and were forced to increase its admissions and tuition fees as the budget dwindled and the staff members and bonuses were being reduced.

== Years of schooling ==
School Year	Age of entry	School Stage	
-	0	Infantário / Creche; Nursery	
-	1	Infantário / Creche; Nursery	
-	2	Infantário / Creche; Nursery	
-	3	Jardim de Infância; Kindergarten	
-	4	Jardim de Infância; Kindergarten	
-	5	Jardim de Infância; Kindergarten	
1st year	6	1º Ciclo / Escola Primária / Ensino Primário; 1st Cycle / Primary School / Primary Education	Ensino Básico; Basic Education
2nd year	7	1º Ciclo / Escola Primária / Ensino Primário; 1st Cycle / Primary School / Primary Education	Ensino Básico; Basic Education
3rd year	8	1º Ciclo / Escola Primária / Ensino Primário; 1st Cycle / Primary School / Primary Education	Ensino Básico; Basic Education
4th year	9	1º Ciclo / Escola Primária / Ensino Primário; 1st Cycle / Primary School / Primary Education	Ensino Básico; Basic Education
5th year	10	2º Ciclo; 2nd Cycle	Ensino Básico; Basic Education
6th year	11	2º Ciclo; 2nd Cycle	Ensino Básico; Basic Education
7th year	12	3º Ciclo; 3rd Cycle	Ensino Básico; Basic Education
8th year	13	3º Ciclo; 3rd Cycle	Ensino Básico; Basic Education
9th year	14	3º Ciclo; 3rd Cycle	Ensino Básico; Basic Education
10th year	15	Ensino Secundário; Secondary Education	
11th year	16	Ensino Secundário; Secondary Education	
12th year	17	Ensino Secundário; Secondary Education	

Students must turn 6 years old by the end of the civil year of entry in 1st year of school.

=== School year calendar ===
Each school year starts in mid September and ends in mid June. There are three holiday breaks during the year: Christmas break (2 weeks), Carnival break (3 days) and Easter break (2 weeks). The school year is divided in three terms, usually limited by the following dates:

- 1st term - from 15–21 September to the end of the 2nd week of December
- 2nd term - from the first Monday of January (after January 1, which is a National Holiday) to two weeks before Easter
- 3rd term - from the Monday right after Easter to the 2nd half of June / 1st half of July. The 1st years ending school are 9th, 11th and 12th, since they have National Exams (they end school usually 1 week earlier than the 7th, 8th and 10th years). Kids from 1st to 6th year usually leave school 2 weeks after years 7, 8 and 10; and 3 weeks after years 9, 11 and 12.

After the end of the 3rd term, there are national exams during June and July for students in 9th, 11th and 12th years, and measurement exams in 2nd, 5th and 8th years.

== Pre-primary education ==
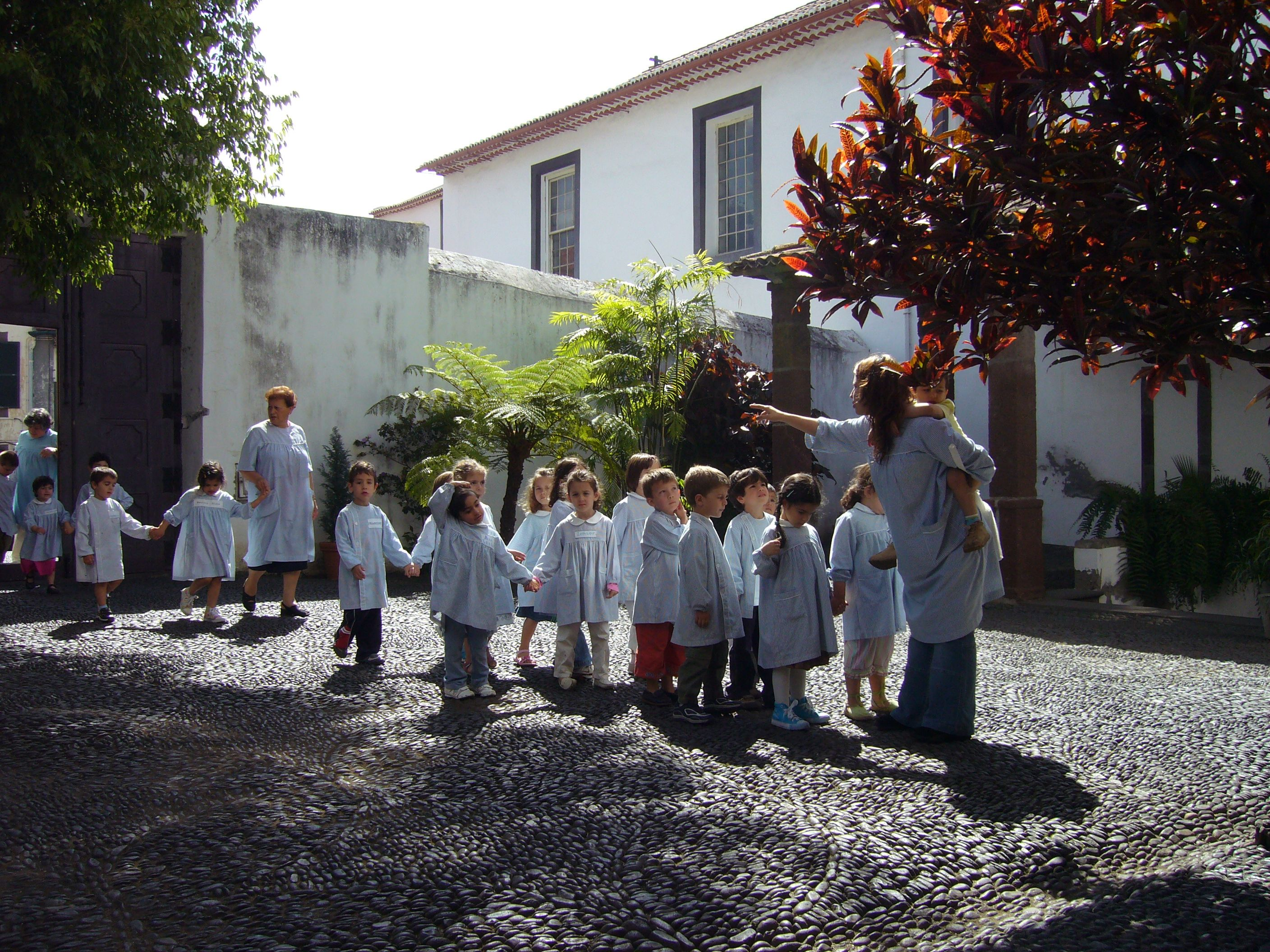
Children and educators from the Santa Clara Community kindergarten, Funchal.

=== Nursery ===
Children from four months (the usual maternity leave) until they are three years old may frequent a nursery (Creche). The large majority of nurseries are private. Other nurseries are run by the Portuguese Social Security and are partly financed by the state. In these nurseries parents pay according to their income.

=== Kindergarten ===
Pre-primary education is optional from the ages of three to five and is provided in both state-run and private kindergartens schools. State-run kindergartens provision is free of charge. The schools are known as Jardins de Infância (Kindergartens). Most international schools offer an international approach to pre-primary learning and follow a curriculum such as the International Baccalaureate.

== Pre-higher education ==
Basic Education (Ensino Básico) lasts for nine years divided into three stages of four, two and three years respectively. The stages are respectively 1º Ciclo (1st Cycle), 2º Ciclo (2nd Cycle) and 3º Ciclo (3rd Cycle). Children are required to do two exams at the end of the third stage: Portuguese and Maths. Secondary Education (Ensino Secundário)- public, private or cooperative - is compulsory since the school year of 2012/2013 and consists of a three-year cycle after basic education.

Access to Secondary Education is made through the Certificate of Basic Education. There are three types of programmes: general programmes, professional programmes, and artistic programmes, providing instruction in technical, technological, professional fields and in the Portuguese language and culture. Permeability between the programmes is guaranteed. The teaching and practice of technical, technological or artistic programmes are provided by professional schools and special schools for education in Arts.

Programmes are sanctioned by the Certificado de Habilitações do Ensino Secundário/Diploma de Ensino Secundário (Secondary School Credential/Diploma), which is the prerequisite for access to higher education through national access examination.

=== Basic education ===
In Portugal, Basic Education consists of nine years of schooling divided into three sequential cycles of education of four, two and three years.

Children aged six by 15 September must be enrolled in their first school year in that calendar year. In addition, children who reach the age of six between 16 September and 31 December may be authorized to attend the first stage of education, provided a request is submitted by their parents or guardians to the school nearest to their residence (or place of work) during the annual enrolment period. State-run schools are free of charge; private school tuition is refunded by the State in part or fully, when state-run schools in the area are filled to capacity. The first cycle of basic mandatory education covers years 1st-4th, the second cycle years 5th-6th and the third cycle years 7th-9th. The curriculum contains only general education until the 9th year at which point professional subjects are introduced.

At the end of each cycle, students take national evaluation exams for the subjects of Portuguese Language and Mathematics. Schools do not give (or sell) any books or materials; financial assistance is available for poorer families. The school books are chosen at school's level every four years.

1st Cycle State-run schools are owned by the municipalities; all other State-run schools are owned by the State.

At State-run schools, 1st Cycle students and kindergarten students get free mid-morning or mid-afternoon snacks, generally consisting of a 20 cl milk carton.

==== 1º Ciclo - 1st Cycle ====
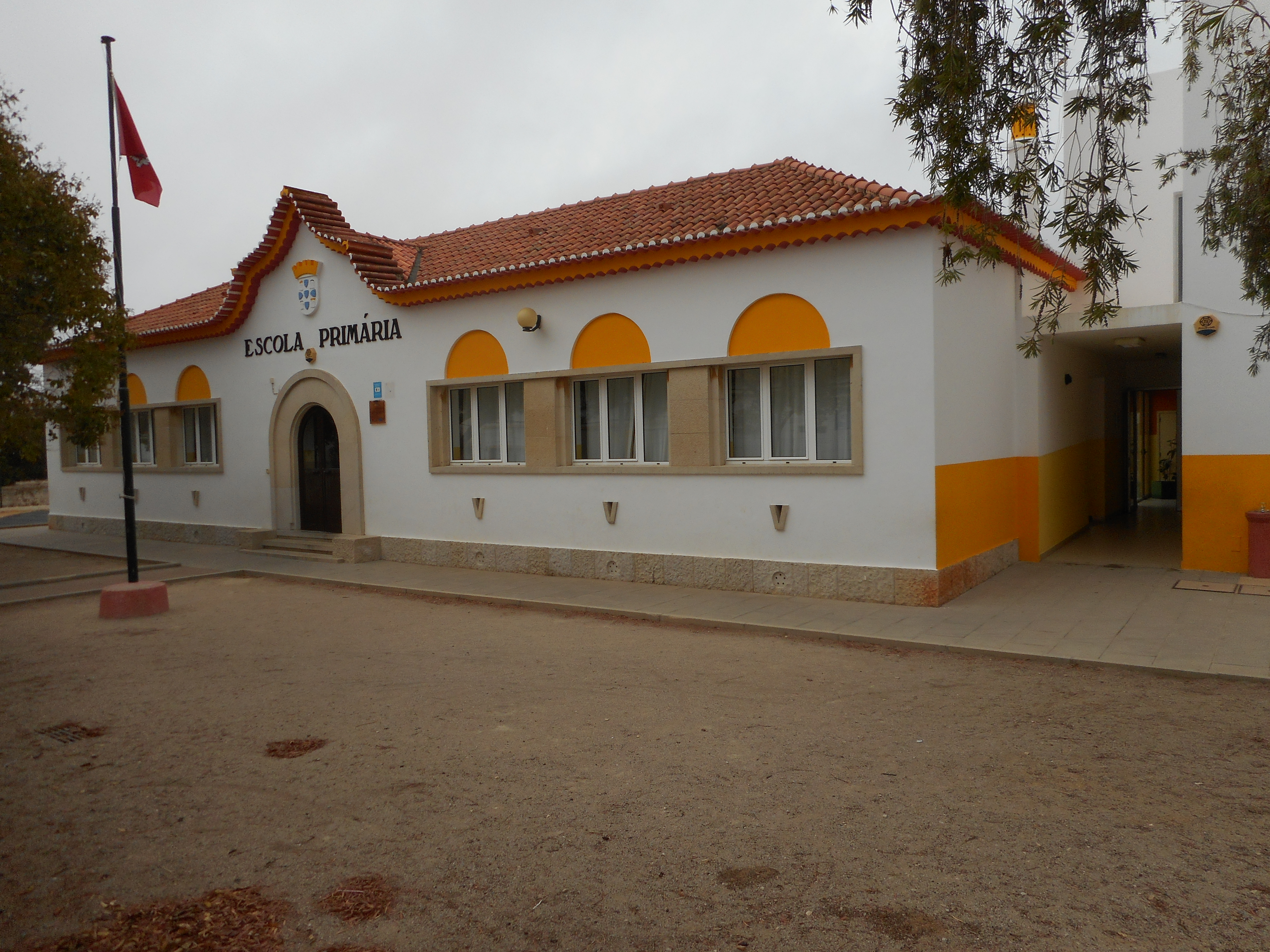
Basic School of the 1st Cycle, Tunes (Silves).

1st, 2nd, 3rd and 4th years

General subjects:

- Portuguese Language
- Environment Study
- Mathematics

Enrichment Activities:

- English Language
- Artistic Education
- Physical Education
- Music Education

Facultative:

- Catholic (or other confessions) Moral and Religious Education
- Foreign Languages (usually only available in private schools)

==== 2º Ciclo - 2nd Cycle ====
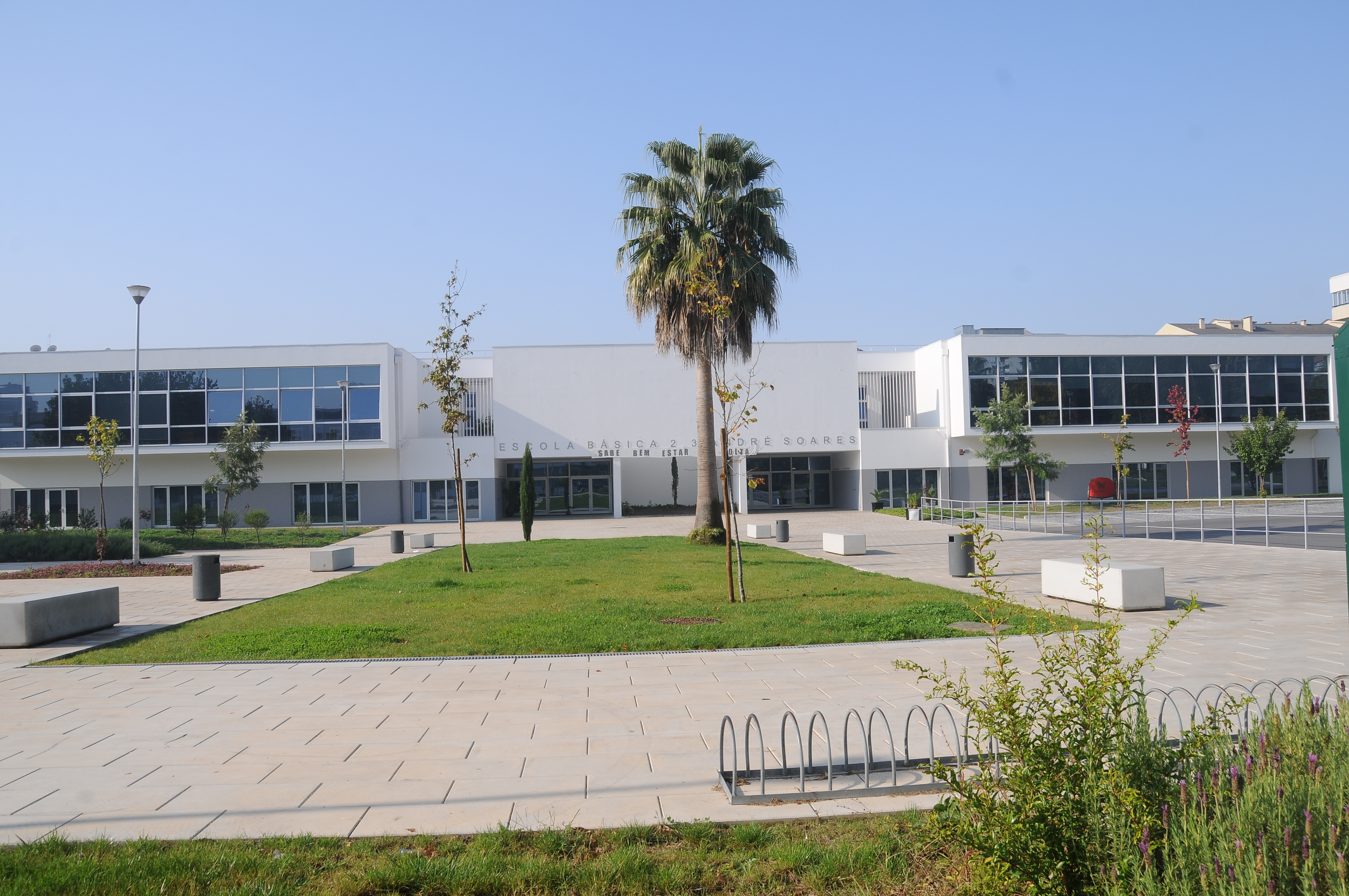
André Soares Basic School of the 2nd and 3rd Cycles, Braga

5th and 6th years

- Portuguese Language
- Mathematics
- History and Geography of Portugal
- English (levels 1 and 2)
- Natural Sciences
- Visual Education (Visual arts)
- Technological Education (Crafts)
- Physical Education
- Music Education
- Catholic (or other confessions) Moral and Religious Education (facultative)

==== 3º Ciclo - 3rd Cycle ====
7th, 8th and 9th years

- Portuguese Language
- Mathematics
- English (levels 3, 4 and 5)
- 2nd Foreign language - French, Spanish or German (levels 1, 2 and 3)
- Natural Sciences
- Physics and Chemistry
- History
- Geography
- Physical Education
- Citizenship and Development
- Visual Education (Visual arts)*
- Technological Education (Crafts)*
- Drama/Music*
- Computer and IT / an alternative of the school (only in 7th and 8th years)
- Catholic (or other confessions) Moral and Religious Education (facultative)
- Sexual Education (depending on the schools, this class might be taught in different ways: for example, 1 session every 2 weeks; or one session every week that takes up the time from a different class from the pre-existing curriculum; etc.)

(*) In the 9th year the student has to choose between Visual Education, Technological Education, Music and Drama, according to the school's availability.

=== Secondary education ===
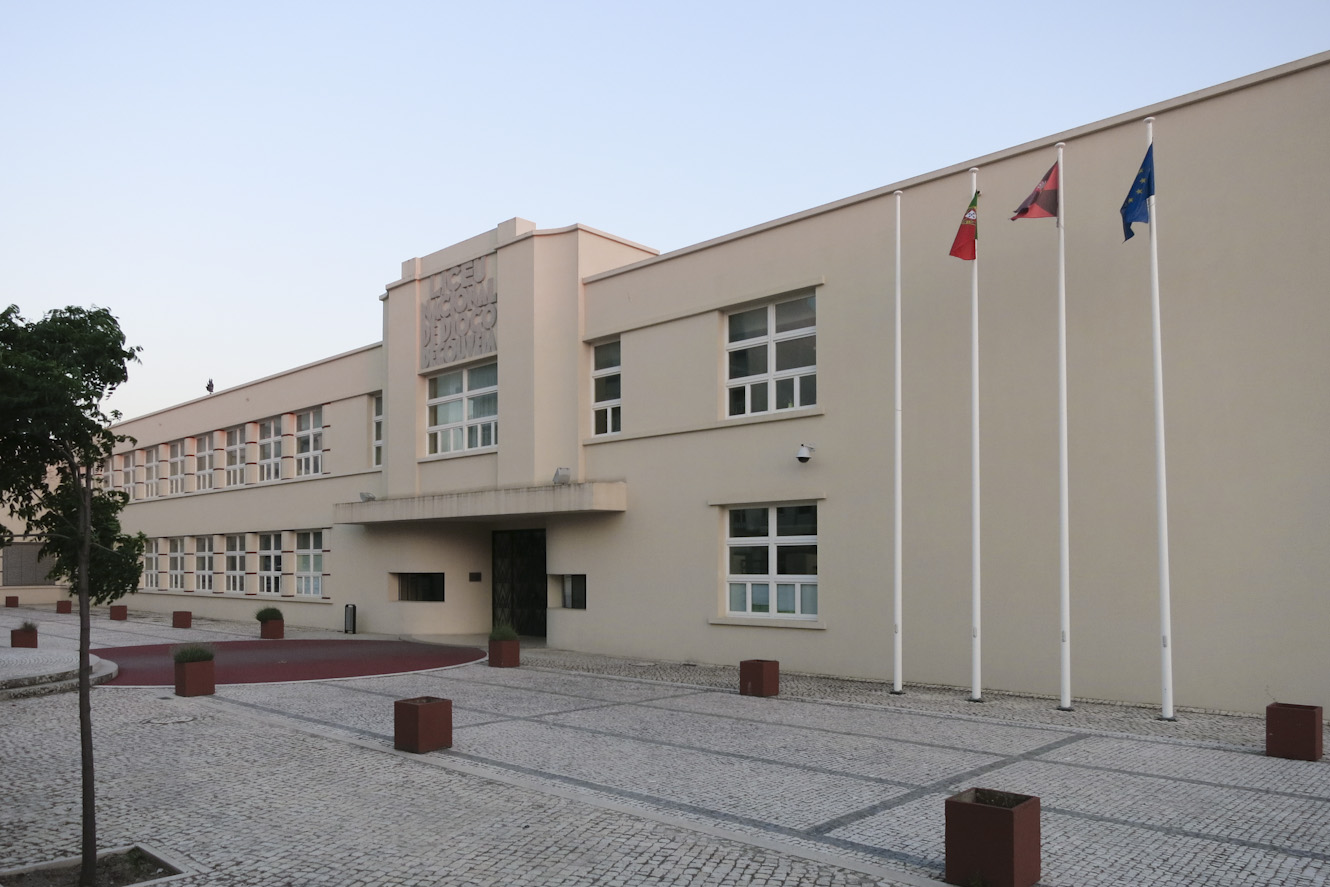
Diogo de Gouveia Secondary School, Beja.

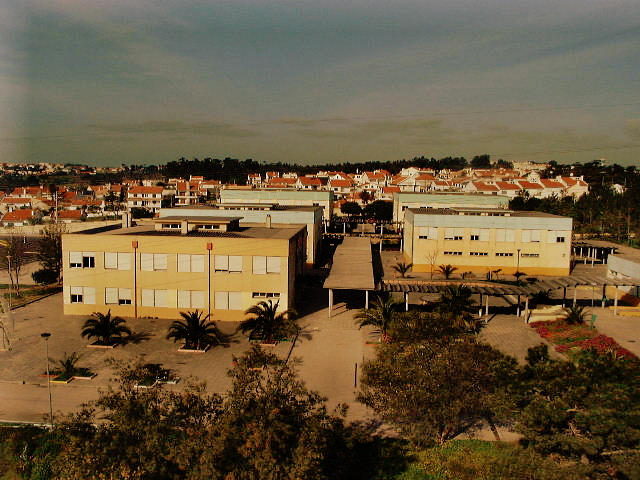
Daniel Sampaio Secondary School, Almada.

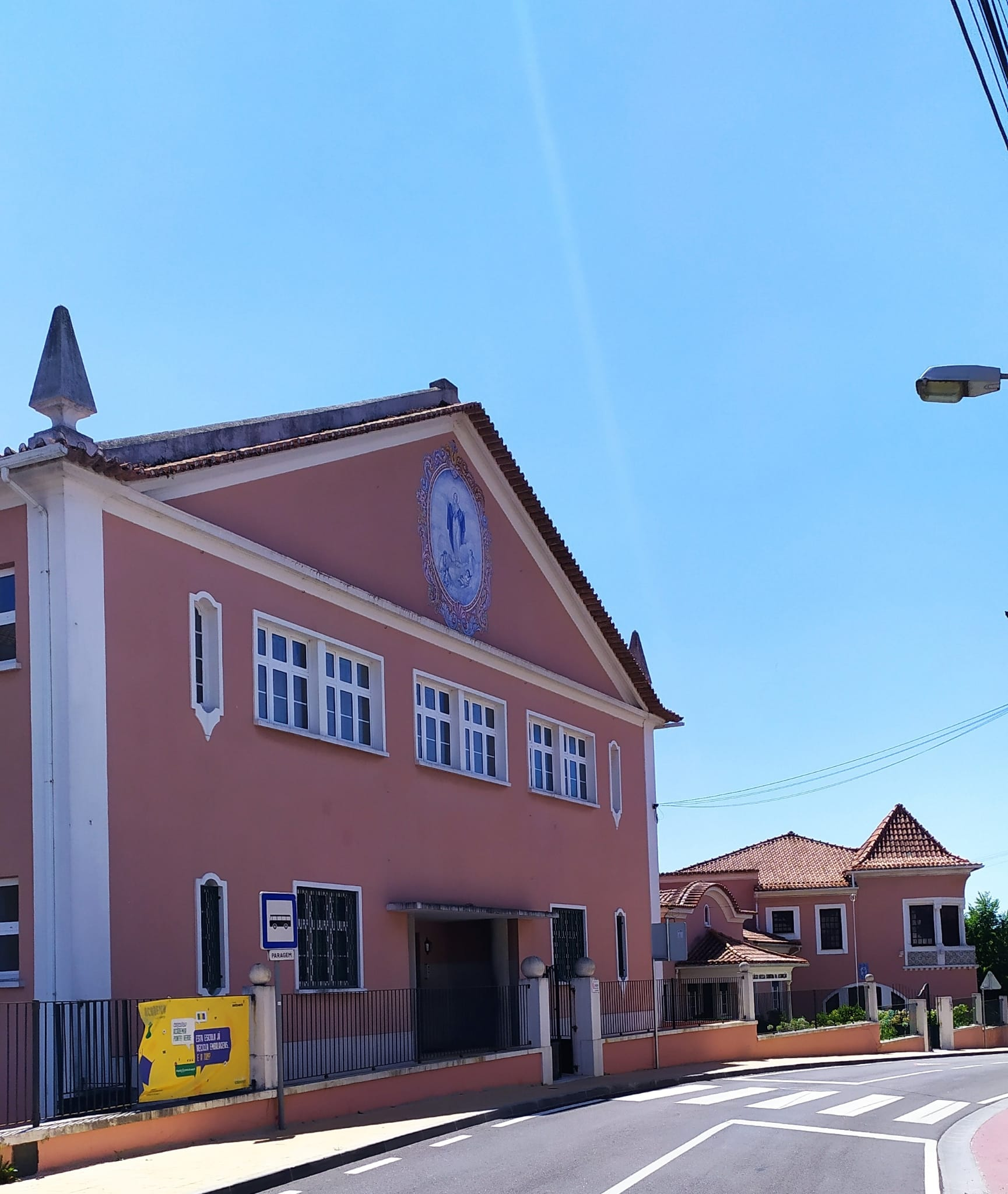
Colégio Nossa Senhora da Assunção, Anadia

It is only after the 9th year of basic schooling that the Portuguese General Education system branches out into different secondary programmes, a higher education-oriented (general secondary programmes), a work-oriented (technological secondary programmes) and an artistic-oriented programme. The conclusion of secondary education (general, technological or artistic programmes) with passing grades confers a diploma, which will certificate the qualification thus obtained and, in the case of work-oriented programmes the qualification for specific jobs. All General and Technological programmes share the following subjects known as General Formation:

- Portuguese Language (10th, 11th and 12th years)
- Physical Education (10th, 11th and 12th years)
- Philosophy (10th and 11th years)
- Foreign Language (10th and 11th years)
- Catholic (or other confessions) Moral and Religious Education (10th, 11th and 12th years - facultative)

==== General Programmes ====
Sciences and Technologies

- Main subject - 10th, 11th and 12th years - Mathematics A
- Specific subjects - 10th and 11th years - Biology and Geology, Descriptive Geometry, Physics and Chemistry A (two of these)
- Optional subjects - 12th year - Biology, Geology, Physics, Chemistry, Psychology, Informatic Applications B, Philosophy A or others (two of these)

Social and Human Sciences

- Main subject - 10th, 11th and 12th years - History A
- Specific subjects - 10th and 11th years - Geography A, Foreign Language II (or III), Portuguese Literature, Math Applied to Social Sciences, Latin (two of these)
- Optional subjects - 12th year - Law, Sociology, Latin, Geography, Psychology, Philosophy A, Economics, Political Sciences, Anthropology, Greek, or others (two of these)

Socio-Economic Sciences

- Main subject - 10th, 11th and 12th years - Mathematics A
- Specific subjects - 10th and 11th years - Economics, History B, Geography (two of these)
- Optional subjects - 12th year - Economics, Geography, Sociology, Psychology, Law or others (two of these)

Visual Arts

- Main subject - 10th, 11th and 12th years - Drawing A
- Specific subjects - 10th and 11th years - Descriptive Geometry, Mathematics B, History of Culture and Art (two of these)
- Optional subjects - 12th year - Art Atelier, Multimedia Atelier, Materials and Technologies, Psychology, Philosophy A or others (two of these)

==== Professional Programmes ====
- Sports
- Architect Technician
- Civil Construction
- Electronics
- Computing
- Equipment Design
- Multimedia
- Administration
- Marketing
- Environment and Territory Order
- Social Action
- Social Animation
- others

==== Specialized Artistic Programmes ====
- Music
- Dance
- Drama and Cinema
- Visual and Audiovisual Arts
- others

==== Secondary school rankings ====
Every year secondary school rankings are divulged by several newspapers such as Público and Expresso.

As of 2020 the ranking according to Agencia Lusa is:

Secondary school rankings in Portugal
Ranking	School	Location (district)
1	Colégio Nossa Senhora do Rosário	Porto
2	Colégio D. Diogo de Sousa	Braga
3	Grande Colégio Universal	Porto
4	Colégio de S. Tomás	Lisbon
5	Colégio de Nossa Senhora da Assunção	Aveiro

=== Access to higher education ===
At the end of the 11th year, students have national exams in the two specific subjects of their course. At the end of the 12th year, the exams are in Portuguese language and the main subject of the course. The access to higher education is made through a national online process, where the students enter the university by priority based on their grades.

The average of grades obtained in all subjects (now including Physical Education) represents a part of the application grade to enter university. The other part is based on the grade of the specific exams that the university requests, which are related with the course the student is applying for. The average of both averages is the application grade to university. That number is between zero and 20; the higher it is, the better the chance to enter the university.

== Other types of school education ==
There are also special modalities of school education. The programmes offered by professional schools, those of the apprenticeship system and those of recurrent studies are considered as a special modality of school education. These programmes are not regular, because they are not included in the mainstream regular progression of the education system to which they are an alternative given that they were designed to respond to specific educational needs of different target-groups of the population.

All of these programmes offer initial professional and education qualification, although the recurrent studies also offer general education. Recurrent education consists of non-regular programmes of study or modular or single units because they are not complete qualification cycles and they are not included in the regular progression of the education system. The recurrent education provides a second opportunity of qualification for those who did not undertake qualification at the normal age or who left school early. Recurrent education covers the three cycles of basic education and the secondary education.

The recurrent education is characterized by the flexibility and adaptability to the students’ learning cycle, availability, knowledge and experiences. The recurrent secondary education branches into two types of courses: the general course for those who want to continue their studies and the technical courses that are work-oriented and confer a level III professional certificate, although they also permit the access to higher education. Any of the secondary courses, professional courses, apprenticeship courses (level III), recurrent courses and others (artistic and those of technological schools) share a three-dimensional structure (although the importance of each dimension could vary according to the specific course):

a) general / socio-cultural

b) specific / scientific

c) technical / technological / practical / professional

The Portuguese educational/professional system is open. This means that once any student finishes his/her basic studies successfully he/she can choose, freely, any kind of course in any domain/area. Any secondary course completed successfully allows the student apply to any course of higher education, independently of the domain the student chose in the secondary level of education. However, to ingress university each superior course requires specific exams correspondent to subjects of a knowledge domain.

In Portugal, initial professional education and qualification can be divided into two main modalities according to the Ministry responsible for the qualification:

a) Initial professional education and qualification in the education system (under the regulation of the Ministry of Education): - The technological secondary courses are work-oriented and confer qualification for specific jobs, which correspond to the E.U. level III of professional qualifications. There are eleven technological courses in the domain of natural sciences, arts, social-economic sciences and humanities;

- The professional schools courses are a special modality of education that has a primary goal: the development of professional qualification. In this type of course the students spend most of their time in practical, technological, technical and artistic qualification, which allows the development of specific skills indispensable to an occupation. The professional courses are drawn to give answers to both local and regional labour market needs. These courses function under the regulation of the Ministry of Education, although under the direct initiative and responsibility of civil society institutions, such as municipalities, enterprises, trade unions, etc. The professional courses are available in the third cycle of basic education (level II) – only a few - and in the secondary education (level III).

- The technical recurrent courses. In the secondary education, the recurrent studies branches into two different types of courses: the general courses and the technical courses. The latter are work-oriented, oriented to confer a level III professional certificate;

- The courses of initial qualification can be promoted by schools lecturing the third cycle of mandatory education. If it is necessary, schools can establish protocols with other institutions such as municipalities, enterprises or professional qualification centres. These courses are open to a) youngsters who have a 9th year diploma, without any professional qualification, and who do not intend to continue their studies; and b) youngsters who, having reached fifteen years of age and attended the 9th year, did not achieve the basic education certificate.

b) Initial professional education and qualification in the labour market (under the regulation of the Ministry of Labour and Social Solidarity through the Institute of Employment and Professional Qualification): - Apprenticeship system. The apprenticeship courses are part of an initial professional qualification system alternating between the school and the workplace, addressing mainly youngsters aged between fifteen and twenty five years who are not included in the mandatory school system. The qualification process alternates between the professional (where the socio-cultural, scientific-technological and the practice qualification in qualification context takes place) and the workplace (where the practice qualification in work context takes place).

In the mid-2000s, education policy was reorganised aiming more choice and better quality in professional technical education. Enhanced and improved technical education programs where implemented in 2007 in an effort to revitalize this sector which had been almost discontinued after the Carnation Revolution of 1974, when many professional schools were administratively upgraded to higher education technical colleges and other were simply closed. This happened despite those professional schools have been generally regarded as reputed institutions with a record of very high standards in professional education across the decades they were supplying the technical labor needs of the country.

== Higher education ==
=== Overview ===
Founded in 1290, the University of Coimbra is Portugal's oldest and most famous.

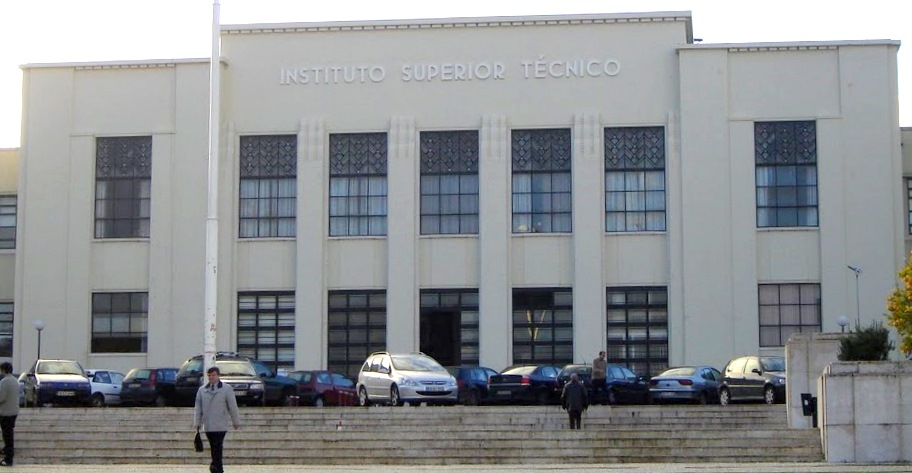
Instituto Superior Técnico, the largest and most prestigious school of engineering in Portugal built in 1937

The University of Coimbra General Library main building – Edifício Novo (New Building, 1962) in the Alta Universitária, Coimbra

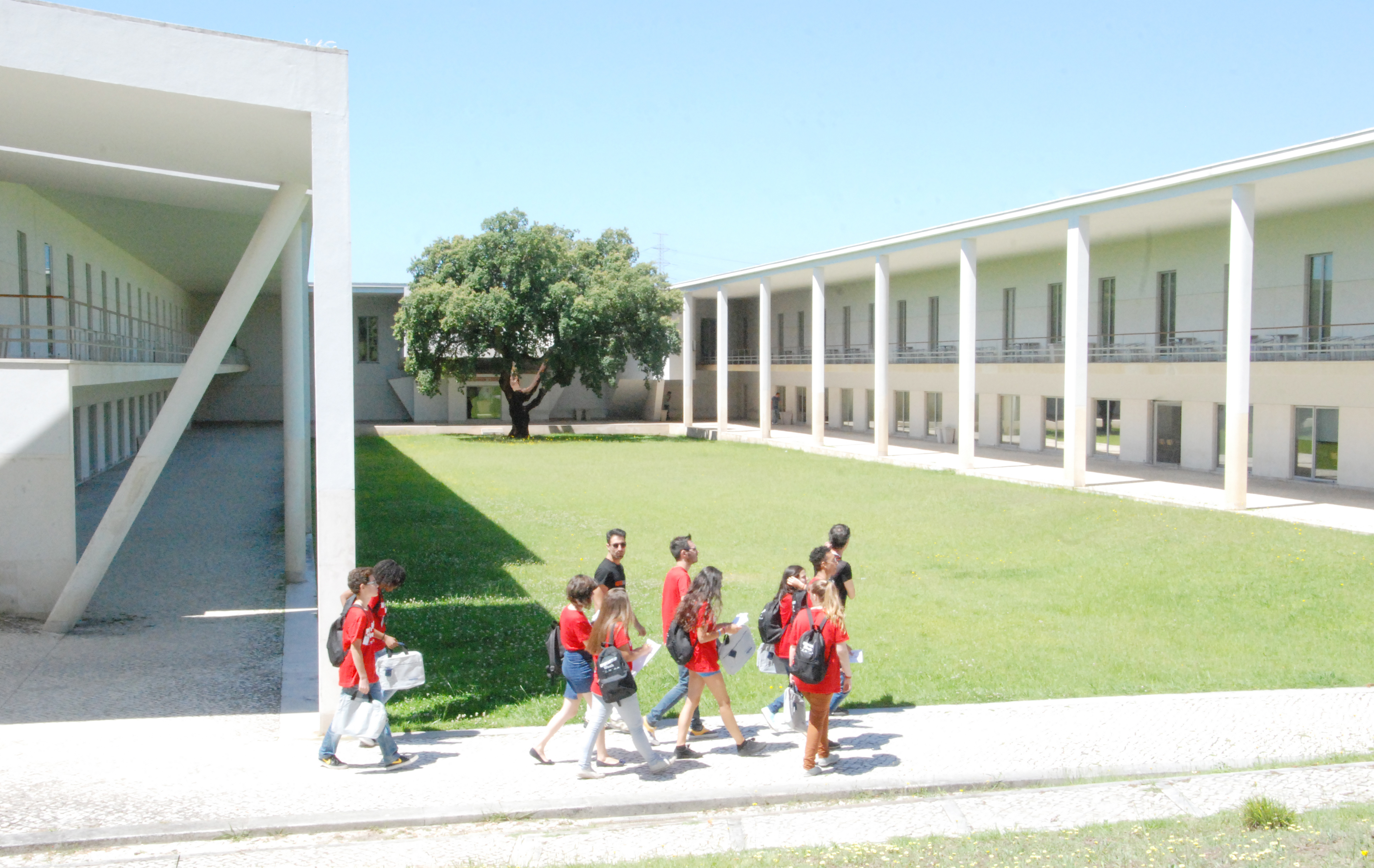
Higher School of Education of the Polytechnic Institute of Setúbal, one of the many polytechnics created in the 1980s.

Higher education in Portugal is divided into two main subsystems: university and polytechnic. It is provided in autonomous universities, in university institutes, in polytechnic institutes and in separate university or polytechnic schools. The previous institutions can be either public, concordat or private. The university subsystem is intended to have a strong theoretical basis and to be highly research-oriented. The polytechnic subsystem is intended to provides a more practical qualification and is profession-oriented.

Degrees in some fields such as medicine, law, natural sciences, economics, psychology or veterinary are only offered in the university system. Nursing, preschool education, accounting technician or health care technician degrees are only offered in the polytechnic system. The other fields, including engineering, technology, management, education, agriculture, sports, or humanities are found both in university and polytechnic systems.

The oldest university is the University of Coimbra founded in 1290, and the biggest by number of enrolled students is the University of Porto with about 28,000 students. The Catholic University of Portugal, the oldest non-state-run university (concordat status), was instituted by decree of the Holy See and is recognized by the Portuguese State since 1971. The current public polytechnic subsystem was founded in the 1980s, but is an evolution of previous systems of higher professional education that existed before. So, although only integrated in the system in the 1980s, several polytechnic institutions are much older, some having their origins back to the 19th century (examples are the Instituto Superior de Engenharia de Lisboa, the Instituto Superior de Engenharia do Porto and the Escola Superior Agrária de Coimbra).

Private higher education institutions cannot operate if they are not recognized by the Ministry of Education. Access is regulated by the same procedures as those for state higher education institutions. The two systems of higher education (university and polytechnic) are linked and it is possible to transfer from one to the other by extraordinary competition. It is also possible to transfer from a public institution to a private one and vice versa. Admission to public university programmes are often more demanding and selective than to their equivalent in public polytechnic and private institutions. Many specific university institutions and degrees are also regarded as more prestigious and reputed than their peers from the polytechnic system or from certain less notable university institutions.

Traditionally, the Portuguese universities were organized in autonomous schools, each designated faculdade (faculty). In the early 20th century, some higher education schools not integrated in universities were designated instituto superior (higher institute). When the present polytechnic system was created in the early 1980s, the standard designation adopted for the divisions of the polytechnic institutes was that of escola superior (higher school). The change of status and the integration of some institutions in universities or in polytechnics, keeping the original names, meant that presently universities can include divisions named faculties, higher institutes or schools and polytechnic institutes can include either higher schools or higher institutes.

After the mid-2000s, with the approval of new legislation and the Bologna Process any polytechnic or university institution of Portugal, is able to award a first cycle of study, known as licenciatura plus a second cycle which confer the master's degree. Before that, this was the rule only for university institutions. Virtually all university institutions award master's degrees as a second cycle of study, but some university departments are offering integrated master's degrees (joint degrees) through a longer single cycle of study. Some polytechnic institutions offer the second study cycle in cooperation with a partner university. Doctorates are only awarded by the universities.

There are also special higher education institutions linked with the military and the police. These specific institutions have generally a good reputation and are popular among the youngsters because its courses are a passport to the military/police career. These state-run institutions are the Air Force Academy, the Military Academy, the Naval School and the Instituto Superior de Ciências Policiais e Segurança Interna.

Over 35% of university-age citizens (20 years old) attend one of the country's higher education institutions (compared with 50% in the United States and 35% in the OECD countries).

Most student costs are supported with public money. However, with the increasing tuition fees a student has to pay to attend a Portuguese state-run higher education institution and the attraction of new types of students (many as part-time students or in evening classes) like employees, businessmen, parents, and pensioners, many departments make a substantial profit from every additional student enrolled in courses, with benefits for the college or university's gross tuition revenue and without loss of educational quality (teacher per student, computer per student, classroom size per student, etc.).

=== University and polytechnic ===
Portugal has two main systems of higher education:

- The university system, which is the oldest, has its origins in the 13th century. It is composed of thirteen public universities, one public university institute, a public open university, and several private universities and university institutes.
- The polytechnic system, that began offering higher education in the 1980s after the former industrial and commercial schools were converted into engineering and administration higher education schools (so its origins could be traced back to some earlier professional education schools of the 19th century). It is composed of fifteen state-run polytechnic institutes, public and private non-integrated polytechnic institutions, and other similar institutions.

=== The Bologna process in Portugal ===
The Bologna Process was a European reform process aimed at establishing a European Higher Education Area by 2010. It was an unusual process in that it was loosely structured and driven by the 45 countries participating in it in cooperation with a number of international organisations, including the Council of Europe.

The reform aim was to create by 2010 a higher education system in Europe, organised in such a way that:

- it is easy to move from one country to the other (within the European Higher Education Area) – for the purpose of further study or employment;
- the attractiveness of European higher education is increased so many people from non-European countries also come to study and/or work in Europe;
- the European Higher Education Area provides Europe with a broad, high quality and advanced knowledge base, and ensures the further development of Europe as a stable, peaceful and tolerant community.

Portugal, like other European States, has conducted educational policies and reforms to accomplish these objectives. This include the reorganization of both university and polytechnic subsystems and the implementation of extensive legal and curricular changes. Since its field application in 2006 it has been widely contested by students (many lost an academic year with the change), and several universities had disrepute the concept by introducing integrated master's degrees in several courses.

=== Degree significance ===
When Portugal adhered to the Bologna process (implemented in 2006 - 2007), a political decision was taken to maintain the names of some older degrees, but with new significances. This still causes some confusion, especially in fields like engineering, medicine or law, in which the access to the respective professions was made through a pre-Bologna licenciatura but are not accessible by a post-Bologna degree of the same name. In ascending order of importance, the academic degrees and other qualifications are:

1 - Bacharelato (Bachelor's degree) - Academic title: Bacharel (Bachelor), abbreviation: Bach.. The holders of a bacharelato in some fields could also have specific professional titles like enfermeiro (nurse) or engenheiro técnico (engineering technologist).

- Pre-Bologna: three-year course in a polytechnic.
- Post-Bologna: no longer used. Many of the old bacharelato programmes were converted in post-Bologna licenciatura programs.

2 - Licenciatura (Licenciate degree, equivalent to Bachelor of Arts(BA) or Bachelor of Sciences(BsC)- Academic title: Licenciado (Licensee), abbreviation: Lic.. The holders of a licenciatura in some fields could also have specific professional titles like engenheiro (engineer) or arquiteto (architect). Popularly but incorrectly, holders of a licenciatura were generically treated as doutor (doctor), abbreviated: Dr..

- Pre-Bologna: equivalent to an honours or master's degree with a four- to six-year course in a university, or a Bacharelato complemented with one or two extra years in a polytechnic (called licenciatura bietápica, meaning dual-stage licentiate program) or university. Many of the pre-Bologna licenciatura programs were converted in post-Bologna mestrado programs. Students had to present their public dissertation defense in order to be awarded the degree.
- Post-Bologna: three-year course in a university or polytechnic. Many of the post-Bologna licenciatura programmes resulted from the conversion of pre-Bologna bacharelato programs.

3 - Mestrado (Master's degree) - Academic title: Mestre (Master). The Mestrado was not traditional in Portugal, only being introduced in the 1980s, as an intermediate degree between the licenciatura and the doutoramento.

- Pre-Bologna: advanced degree in a specific scientific field, indicating capacity for conducting practical research. The name caused confusion, as the Mestrado was not so much equivalent to the international master's degree, instead being more comparable to an intermediate graduate qualification between the Master's and the Doctor's degrees. Courses lasted from two to four semesters, including lectures and the preparation and discussion of an original dissertation. It was only accessible to those who had obtained a grade average of 14/20 or higher in the Licenciatura course. Those with less than 14/20 may also be eligible for a Mestrado course after analysis of the curriculum by the university.
- Post-Bologna: Licenciatura complemented with one or two extra years in a polytechnic or university; or, in some cases, a 5- to 6-year joint degree (Mestrado Integrado) in a university. Students have to present their public thesis defense in order to be awarded the degree. Many of the post-Bologna Mestrado programs resulted from the conversion of pre-Bologna Licenciatura programs.

4 - Pós-Graduação (Postgraduation) or Especialização (Specialization) - Academic title: No specific academic title. The Pós-Graduação and the Especialização are qualifications but not academic degrees, so their holders keep their previous degrees.

- Usually one year of specific study for holders of a Licenciatura or Mestrado.

5 - Doutoramento (Doctorate) - Academic title: Doutor (Doctor).

- The Doutorado is conferred by universities to those who have passed the Doctorate examinations and have defended a thesis, usually to pursue a teaching and researching career at university level. There is no fixed period to prepare for the Doctorate examinations. Candidates must hold a degree of Mestrado or Licenciatura (if their grade average is equal or higher than 16/20) (or a legally equivalent qualification) and have competences and merit that are recognized by the university.

6 - Agregação (Aggregation) - Academic title: Professor Doutor (Professor Doctor). The Agregação is a qualification but not an academic degree, so their holders keep the Doutor degree.

- This is the highest qualification reserved to holders of the Doutor degree. It requires the capacity to undertake high level research and special pedagogical competence in a specific field. It is awarded after passing specific examinations.

=== Admission ===
Admission to state-run higher education level studies requires either a secondary school credential, Diploma de Ensino Secundário, given after passing twelve study years, and the required ENES exams. An extraordinary exam process is available to anyone aged 23 or older. Admission to private institutions is at the total discretion of each school. Students of Portuguese descent may also apply for a quota of available undergraduate slots for students in the National Contest of Access and Admission (Concurso nacional) using foreign test scores.

Every higher education institution has also a number of other extraordinary admission processes for sportsmen, international students, foreign students from the Lusosphere, degree owners from other institutions, students from other institutions (academic transfer), former students (readmission), and course change, which are subject to specific standards and regulations set by each institution or course department.

==== With secondary school credential ====
Students must have studied the subjects for which they are entering to be prepared for the entrance exams, but they are not required to have previously specialised in any specific area at the secondary school. Students sit for one or more entrance exams, Concurso nacional for public institutions or Concurso local for private institutions. In addition to passing entrance exams, students must fulfil particular prerequisites for the chosen course.

Enrollment is limited; each year the institution establishes the number of places available. This is called the numerus clausus. For the public institutions the exam scores count for the final evaluation, which includes the secondary school average marks. Then the students have to choose six institutions/courses they prefer to attend, in preferential order. The ones, who reach the marks needed to attend the desired institution/course, given the attributed vacant, will be admitted. This means that the students could not be admitted at its first or second choice, but be admitted at the third or even sixth choice.

In some cases, those entering polytechnics or nursing and health technologies schools, should have some previous professional qualification and preference will be given to applicants from the catchment area of the institution concerned. From the academic year 2005/2006 onwards, access rules have enforced minimum grades of 95 (out of 200) in the national access examinations for all candidates in every sector of public higher education. In practical terms, and unlike what happened in the past, the new rule meant the exclusion of a large number of applicants who otherwise would have been admitted with negative grades to the less selective courses of some public institutions, and consequently lead to a number of available places for students left vacant every year in many courses.

==== Extraordinary exam process ====
Even without a complete secondary school education, anyone 23 or above can apply to state-run higher learning institution through the Exame Extraordinário de Avaliação de Capacidade para Acesso ao Ensino Superior (extraordinary exam to assess the capacity to enter higher-level studies), also called the Ad-Hoc exam. The process consists of the general Portuguese exam, an interview to evaluate motivation and CV, and additional exams specific to each school and course, obligatorily written and oral. Candidates approved go through a separate numerus clausus or enroll directly at the discretion of the school's board.

As what happens with the Concurso Nacional through the Exames Nacionais do Ensino Secundário (ENES), the Extraordinary Exam Process for over-23-year-old candidates is more demanding and is more selective in public universities than in the public polytechnics. Humanities and other non-mathematical-intensive fields have also much higher admission rates than classical university engineering, economics or medicine. This implies that almost all new students admitted by this process enter a polytechnic institution, private institution, or humanities programmes.

== Teacher education ==
Qualification of pre-primary and primary/basic school teachers

Teachers of basic education attend 4-year courses in Escolas Superiores de Educação or at the universities to obtain a Licenciado degree.

The government as passed a law (February/2007) that makes a teacher to have also a "mestre" degree in Basic and Secondary Education.

Qualification of secondary school teachers

Teachers of secondary education must hold a Licenciado degree and follow courses that last for between four and six years. Studies are sanctioned by a Licenciado em Ensino or a Licenciatura - Ramo de Formação Educacional, according to the issuing institution. Educators and basic and secondary education teachers, with practice in regular or special education, may obtain a qualification to teach in specialized education. Continuous qualification for teachers is offered in Centros de Formação Continua.

In February 2007, the government passed a law requiring teachers to have a "mestre" degree in Basic and Secondary Education.

Qualification of higher education teachers

Teachers at this level receive no formal professional qualification, but minimum qualifications are laid down for each category.

University: assistente estagiário (Licenciado); assistente (Mestre); professor auxiliar (Doutor); professor associado (Doutor and five years' service); professor catedrático (Agregação and three years' service).

Polytechnics: assistente (Licenciado); professor adjunto (Mestre or DESE); professor coordenador (Doutor and 3-years' service).

== Non-traditional studies ==
At present, distance higher education is provided by the Universidade Aberta (Open University).

== Private vs. public ==
Private Basic and Secondary schools and also private higher education institutions do exist in Portugal and are sometimes elite institutions (like the Universidade Católica Portuguesa in Lisbon and Porto, or some private primary, basic and secondary schools, mainly located in the biggest cities), existing among them many religious or speciality institutions. Many of the best ranked secondary schools in the country are private schools, as well as some of the worst ranked secondary schools. This secondary schools ranking has been released every year in Portugal, and is based on the student's average grades in the National Examinations which are used for higher education admission.

Among the best ranked public and private secondary schools are those of Lisbon, Porto and Coimbra. Schools from littoral areas are better ranked than schools from interior and less populated regions. The worst gap between internal school marks by course and the national examination marks is seen among private schools, with higher grades attributed by the school to students who perform poorly in the national examinations.

Some Portuguese employers and families are of the opinion that the existence of private education institutions, where accessibility is based primarily on ability to pay, is not as fair as the public system and could gloom the meritocracy concept, leading to easier entrance criteria and lower teaching standards. Some private institutions are known for making it easy for students to enter and also to get higher grades - as long as they pay. Others claim that the private systems could prevent a significant portion of Portugal's population from being able to attend these schools that is also unfair. The quotas imposed on public education institutions to create room for students from former Portuguese colonies, who get automatically a place in those institutions also creates a big problem in terms of fairness, as some of these students can enter with very low grades excluding a portion of the Portuguese born students from studying in the public institutions and first choice courses they want.

On the other side there are some people who prefer to attend private institutions because they don't trust in the public educational infrastructure they have near their residential area. This could be related with overcrowded classes, bad reputation, criminality levels, incidence of ethnic minorities generally considered problematic, lack of quality teaching staff or bad infrastructures in that specific institution.

Without large endowments like those received, for example, by many of the US private universities and colleges, and with little tradition of excellence in the sector, the private higher education institutions of Portugal, with a few exceptions, do not have either the financial support or the academic profile to reach the highest teaching and research standards of the major Portuguese public universities. In addition, a lack of collaboration between the most prominent private sector enterprises and the private universities is also restrictive, and represents another comparative disadvantage between public and private higher education institutions.

Traditionally, public system's institutions are regarded in general as having higher quality and accountability, but private institutions have developed quickly after the 25 de Abril revolution of 1974, and some have today a great reputation. There are both public and private institutions considered of the highest standard and quality. However, a large majority of Portuguese students attend public schools, universities and colleges because it is considerably less expensive than the private ones, the public system has a much older implantation, and for the other side it covers well the entire territory. There are also some students who simply desire and can afford to attend an elite private institution, even if they have availability to attend one of the largest or most renowned public institutions.

A number of scandals and affairs involving private higher education institutions (Universidade Moderna (1998), Universidade Independente (2007) and Universidade Internacional (2009), among others), and a general perception of many of those institutions as having a tendentially relaxed teaching style with less rigorous criteria, have contributed to their poor reputation which originated a state-run inspection of private higher education institutions in 2007.

== School violence ==
School violence in Portugal is not unique to public schools or the major urban centers. Public and private Portuguese schools have all experienced an increase in school violence. However, due to the general wealth and educational background of private school students' families and the increased private security measures adopted, private schools generally have a lower level of violence.

Violence in Portuguese schools became an educational issue for the first time during the 1990s, mainly through the persistence of parental associations and teacher claims. The causes are diverse, ranging from poverty to psychological problems. Theft, random or systematic physical aggression, bullying, destruction of school or teachers properties are realities which become current in many schools. However, it must be said that this was not the first time that violence appeared in Portuguese schools as a significant situation. After the 25 de Abril revolution of 1974 the occurrence of violent situations reached the highest point. This was a politically socialized and framed violence, quite different from the kind of violence found today.

In May 2006, a television program was broadcast in RTP 1, titled Quando a violência vai à escola (When violence goes to school) by journalist Mafalda Gameiro. Using hidden cameras in the classrooms, the program shows the violent behavior of many young students (with ages between 10 and 13 years old) inside the classroom of an unidentified school and the resulting chaos and fear. Students and teachers privacy was protected during image recording for TV. In 2004 and 2005, the Portuguese Ministry of Education reported over 1,200 aggressions inside Portuguese schools.

=== School safety ===
Escola Segura provides a safety program to 11,000 schools, it involves 600 police officers a day, 300 cars and 160 motorbikes.

== Foreign international schools in Portugal ==
There are some foreign international schools in Portugal, especially in Lisbon and Porto areas, and also in the Algarve region. These places have a large number of settled foreign families from high income countries.

These include the Aljezur International School, Carlucci American International School of Lisbon (CAISL), VVIS International School Algarve, St Julian's School, Oeiras International School, St Dominic's International School, Prime School Trilingual International School and Vilamoura International School and Greenes Tutorial College.

== Portuguese international school in Madeira Island, Portugal ==
There is one international school in Madeira Island Portugal.

Escola da APEL is a non profit private Catholic School, founded 40 years ago in Funchal, with an excellent reputation. It offers the International Bacallaureate Diploma Programme and the Portuguese regular curriculum.

== Criticism ==
Education has been a subject of controversy in Portugal due to a number of erratic policies and the state of flux it has experienced by several long periods, particularly between the carnation revolution coup of 1974 to the Bologna process of 2007.

There has been also concerns related to the large dropout rates (mostly in the secondary and higher education systems), and the high multi generational functional illiteracy (48% functional illiterates in Portugal, among the adult population; all over U.S.A. 30 million (14% of adults) are functionally illiterate) and illiteracy rates (7.5% = ~ 800,000 illiterates) - a quite mediocre statistical record when compared with other developed countries of Europe, North America and Eastern Asia.

The failure of many private universities and other higher education institutions in providing higher education to students due to generalized lack of quality and rigour has also been a major problem - for several years those institutions were awarding degrees to thousands of people who were spread into the economically active population. Some higher education institutions, in particular from the private and polytechnic sector, have been regarded as true diploma mills. In the following decades after their creation in the 1970s and 1980s, the polytechnic institutions didn't assume their specific role as tertiary education professional schools, which were created to award practical diplomas in more technical or basic fields.

Non-university intermediate professionals and skilled workers for the industry, agriculture, commerce and other services where needed. As more new public university institutions were founded or expanded, polytechnics didn't feel comfortable with their subaltern status in the Portuguese higher education system and a desire to be upgraded into university-like institutions grew among the polytechnic institutions' administrations. This desire of emancipation and evolution from polytechnic status to university status, was not followed by better qualified teaching staff, better facilities for teaching or researching, or by a stronger curricula with a more selective admission criteria, comparable with those enforced by almost all public university institutions. Criteria ambiguity and the general lower standards in polytechnic higher education and admission, were fiercely criticised by education personalities like university rectors, regarding issues like the lack of admission exams in mathematics for polytechnic engineering applicants, and the proliferation of administration and management courses everywhere, many without a proper curriculum in mathematics, statistics and economics-related disciplines.

According to studies and reports, in the 1990s and 2000s, a fast growth and proliferation of private higher education and state-run polytechnical institutions with lower educational standards and ambiguous academic integrity, was responsible for unnecessary and uneconomic allocation of resources with no adequate quality output in terms of both new highly qualified graduates and research.

In March 2008, a mega-protest hit many Portuguese cities along the country, joining over 85,000 basic and secondary school teachers from all the country in the capital city of Lisbon (March 8), criticizing the Portuguese Minister of Education Maria de Lurdes Rodrigues (XVII Governo Constitucional headed by PM José Sócrates) and her new policies, including a new system of teacher's evaluation.

In addition, the XVII Governo Constitucional (the government headed by PM José Sócrates), created a policy of certification and equivalence of qualifications for adult people with low levels of formal education who want a 4th, 6th, 9th or 12th year equivalence without returning to school (for example, through this process, called Novas Oportunidades, adults (18 years old and older) with the 9th year might be granted an equivalence to the 12th year after a process ranging from a part-time 3-month programme or a 1-day per week 8-month programme; those who have less than 9th year have a similar programme to get the 9th year certification and can then apply to the 12th year programme). The curricula do not include any classical high school discipline or a traditional examination process. These diplomas are awarded based on vaguely construed life experience. Some critics alleged this policy was an effort to make up the poor national statistical indicators on education, with little impact on the quality of the work force's qualification of Portugal in the European Union context.

== See also ==
- Higher education in Portugal
- List of schools in Portugal
- List of universities and colleges in Portugal
- Open access in Portugal

== Sources ==
- Ramos, Rui (2010). História de Portugal (4th ed.). A Esfera dos Livros.
- Education in Portugal - country-studies.com
- Euroeducation.net - Structure of Educational System in Portugal
- country-data.com Portugal - EDUCATION
- Funding higher education in Portugal: between State and market, Educ. Soc. vol.25 no.88 special, Campinas October 2004
- SOURCE: UNESCO Institute for Statistics, Global Education Database (note: As of February 27, 2012, the Global Education Database is no longer being maintained and its data and analytical tools are no longer available on the Internet.)
- NATIONAL REPORT ON THE IMPLEMENTATION OF THE BOLOGNA PROCESS (AUGUST 2003)
- Engenharia do Séc.XX (Portuguese)
- JVCosta - Higher Education in Portugal (Portuguese)
