= Lycée Français International de Porto =

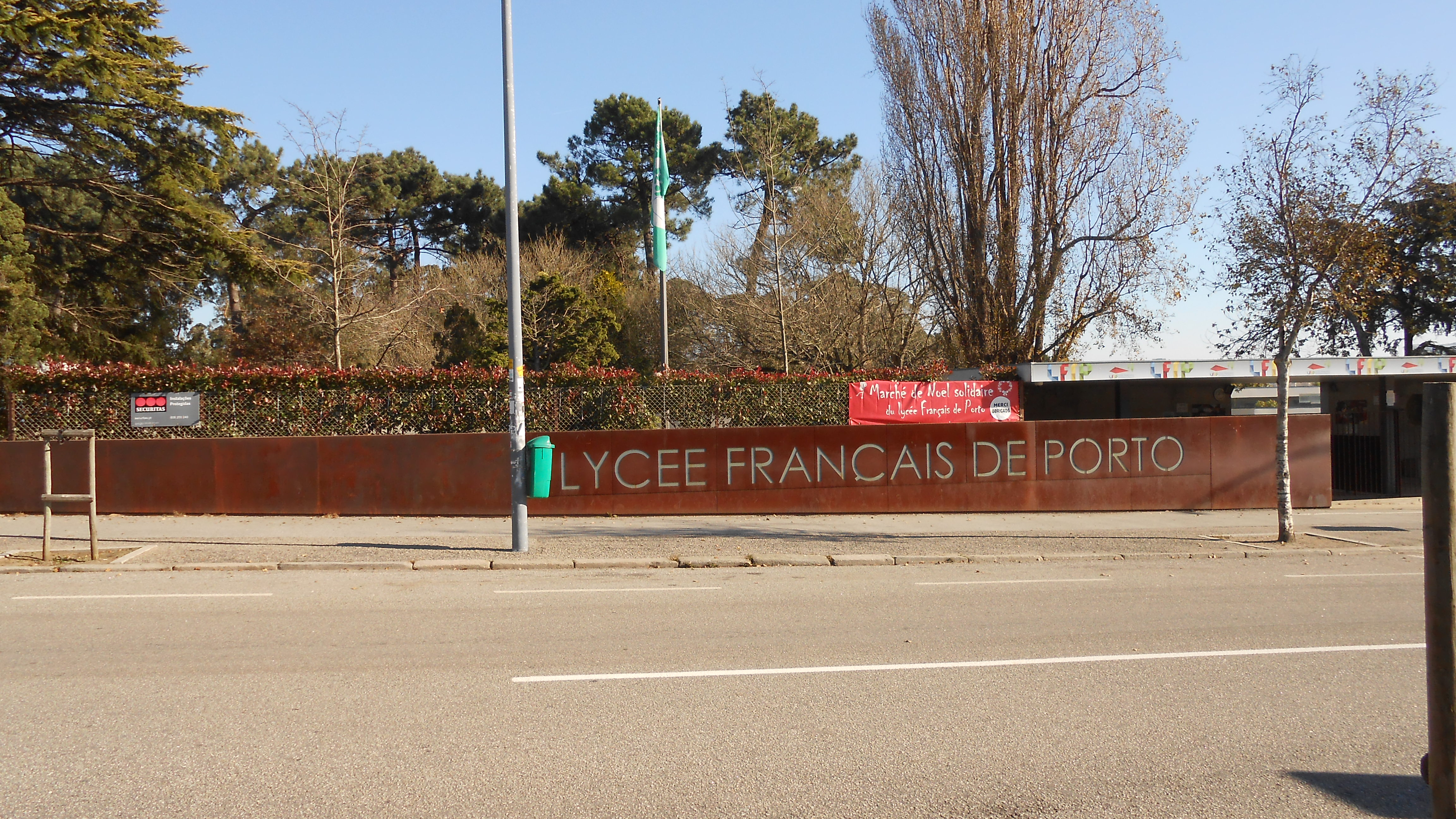

Location
- 27 rua Gil Eanes, 4150-348 Porto; 41.1573°N 8.6596°W

Information
- Established: 1963
- Website: www.lfip.pt/en

The Lycée Français International de Porto is a French international school in Porto, Portugal. Its education ranges from maternelle (preschool) to lycée (senior high school). The French School of Porto was formally inaugurated on 30 October 1963 by the Ambassador of France in Lisbon M. De Beauverger.
