= Oeiras International School =

Private school in Lisbon, Portugal

Location
- Barcarena; Oeiras; Lisbon; Portugal
- Coordinates: 38°43′36″N 9°16′41″W

Information
- School type: Non-Profit Organisation, Private IB World School
- Motto: Sapere Aude (Dare to Learn)
- Established: 2010
- Principal: Robert Tomalin
- Staff: 104
- Years offered: 2-13
- Enrolment: 463
- Average class size: 16
- Education system: International Baccalaureate
- Website: https://ois.pt/

Oeiras International School (OIS) is an IB World School in Oeiras, a suburb of Lisbon, Portugal.

== Overview ==
Established in 2010, the English-speaking school offers the International Baccalaureate program throughout all year groups. The school caters for students from Year 2 through to Year 13, having previously hosted only students in Years 7 through 12 during its inaugural academic year (2010/11) and expanding to include students in the IB Primary Years Programme in later years.

The school campus is based on the premises of a 17th-century palace, the Quinta de Nossa Senhora da Conceição in Barcarena, Oeiras. The 5 hectare campus was refurbished in 2011. During its inaugural year (2010/2011), the school opened at temporary premises, located at Fundição de Oeiras, but has since been located at its present campus. OIS purchased an additional property in 2026, and has plans to open these premises for MYP and DP students starting in the 2026–2027 school year.

OIS became an Eco-School and additionally received the Green Flag Award in the 2024/2025 school year. OIS intends to promote Environmental Awareness and Social Responsibility with the provision of scholarships and community service. OIS offers The Duke of Edinburgh's Award for students in Year 9 and above.

== Motto ==
The school motto is Sapere Aude (Dare to Learn).

== Location ==
Quinta de Nossa Senhora da Conceição, à Rua Antero de Quental, Barcarena, 2780-001 Oeiras, Portugal

== See also ==
- Education in Portugal
- Eco-Schools
- International school
