= Colégio Dom Diogo de Sousa =

Coordinates: 41°33′27.00″N 8°24′57.35″W

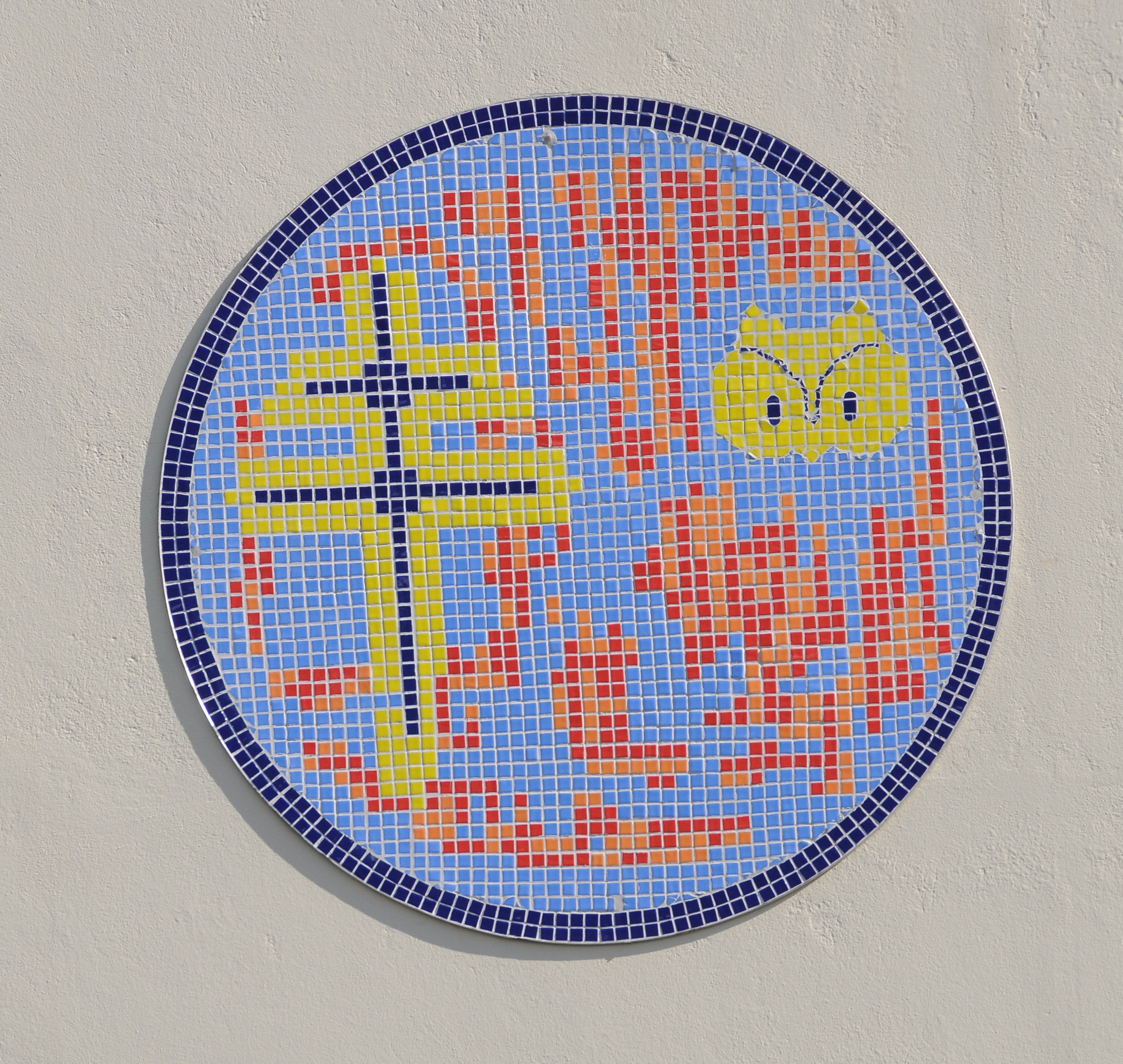

Location
- Rua Conselheiro Bento Miguel; Braga; Portugal

Information
- Type: Private
- Established: 1949
- Principal: Nuno Miguel Cardoso da Cunha
- Affiliation: Catholic
- Website: portal.cdds.pt
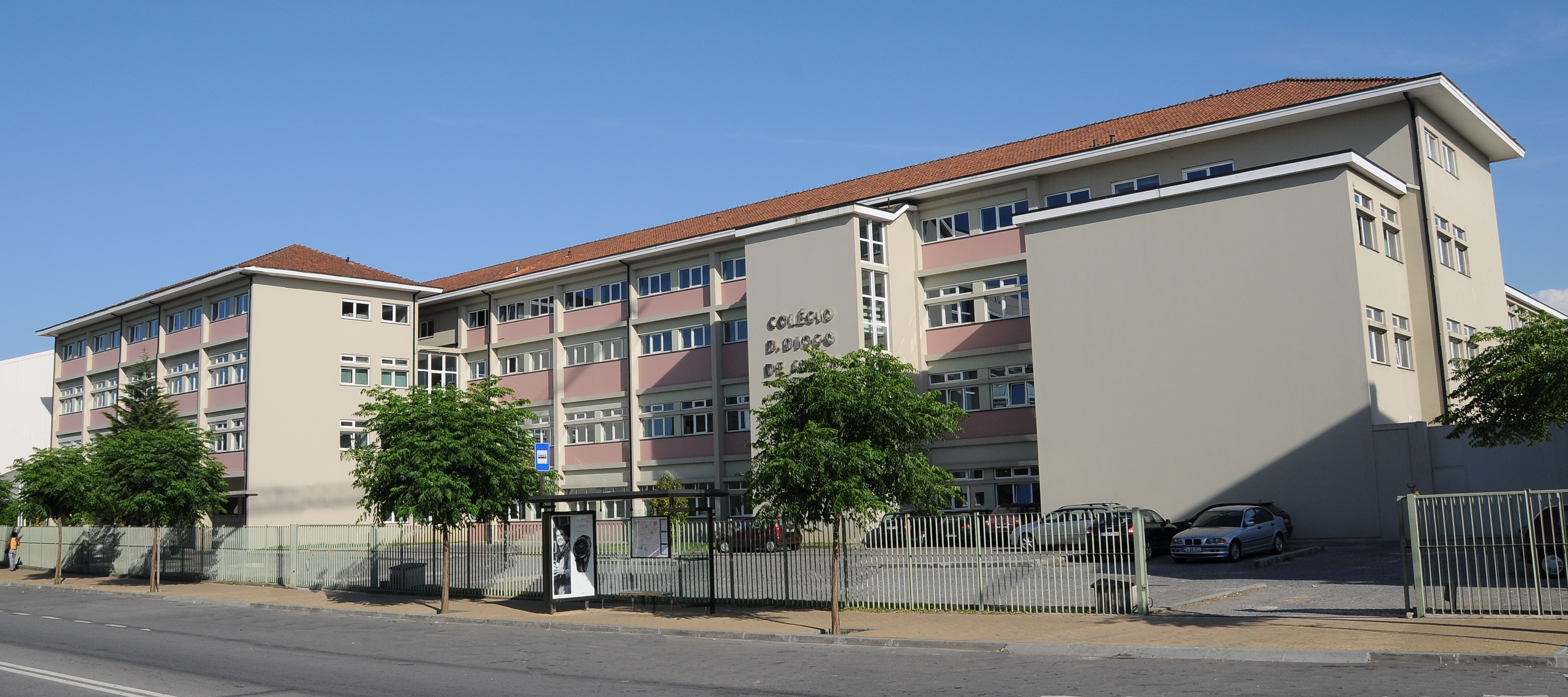

The Colégio Dom Diogo de Sousa is a Catholic school located in São Vicente, Braga, Portugal.

== History ==
It is owned by the Archdiocese of Braga. It was established in 1949 and the school inaugurated a new building in 1956.

== List of Principals ==
- Pe. Joaquim António Alves (1949-1951)
- Mons. Elísio Fernandes de Araújo (1951-1991)
- Pe. António José Gomes Marques (1991-2003)
- Pe Cândido Azevedo de Sá (2003-2025)
- Nuno Miguel Cardoso da Cunha (2025.now)
