= Deutsche Schule zu Porto =

- Colégio Alemão do Porto
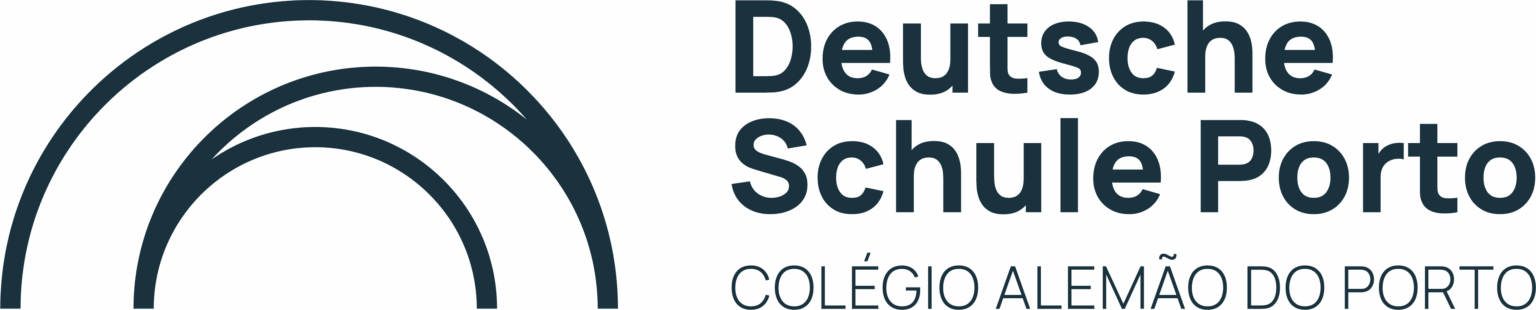

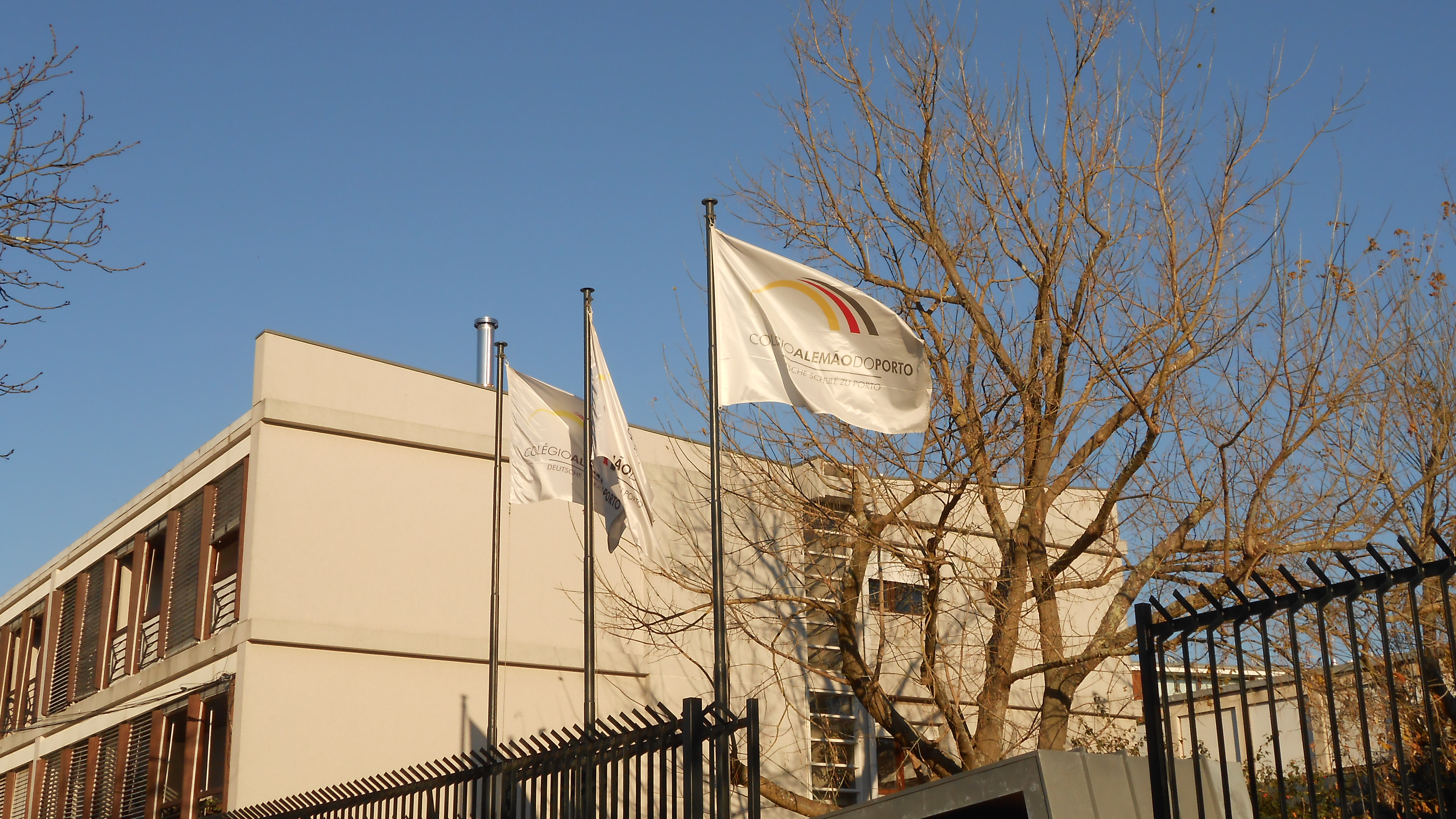

Location
- Rua Guerra Junqueiro, 162 4150-386; Porto, Portugal
- Coordinates: 41°09′16″N 8°38′15″W

Information
- Type: Private
- Established: 18 November 1901
- Director: Reiner Ries
- Faculty: 88
- Grades: K-12
- Enrollment: +700
- Website: dsporto.de

Deutsche Schule zu Porto (Portuguese: Colégio Alemão do Porto), in English German School of Porto or simply DSP, is a German school located in Porto, Portugal. In Portugal, it is considered a private school, while in Germany it corresponds to a public school.

== History ==
The German School of Porto was established on November 18, 1901. The initiative was led by Pastor Boit from Lisbon, supported by donations from the local German evangelical community and financial aid from the German Imperial Government. The school initially operated in a rented three-story house on Rua da Restauração, with Pastor Martin Richter serving as its first director. On the day before the official opening, a Thanksgiving mass took place. It was third German school in Portugal following one in Lisbon and one in Amora (was later defunct).

The school was originally attended exclusively by students of German nationality, and German was the language of instruction and daily communication. In 1904, a special German language course was discontinued, as most children were already fluent before entering the school. Despite its German character, the school also valued Portuguese language and culture, hiring a Portuguese teacher in 1910 to teach History and Geography of Portugal.

During World War I, after Portugal entered the conflict, Germans and their descendants up to the third generation were interned or expelled, leading to the temporary closure of the school. Some families moved to Vigo, Spain, where a small improvised school continued to operate. The school in Porto eventually reopened in May 1922.

== Student body ==
As of 2025, the school had 694 students. 85% of the students were Portuguese. Germans make up the majority of the other students.

== Activities ==
=== Sportbegegnung ===
The Sportbegegnung (in English sports encounter) is an event where the German schools from Porto, Lisbon, Madrid and Malaga face themselves in sports competitions. The 2007 Sportbegegnung took place in Porto. Some highlights of the competition were shown on Porto Canal, a channel of Porto.

=== Jugend Musiziert ===
Jugend musiziert is an event where students from all the German schools of the Iberian peninsula meet each other in a Music contest. The contest takes place each year in a different school.

=== "Schüleraustausch Oettingen/Porto" ===
The Schüleraustausch (student exchange program) between the German School of Porto and the Albrecht-Ernst-Gymnasium in Oettingen, Germany, was established in 2002 by a teacher who previously worked at the school in Oettingen. It is a voluntary program, where participants host their exchange partners for one week in their homes and then spend eight days with their partners' families in the other country. The program aims to promote cultural understanding and provide students with an opportunity to experience everyday life in a different country. During their stay in Germany, students visit cities such as Munich and Nuremberg and attend classes at the Albrecht-Ernst-Gymnasium. In Portugal, participants explore Porto and take part in school activities.
