= Escola Secundária Eça de Queirós (Póvoa de Varzim) =

Secondary School Eça de Queirós
- Escola Secundária de Eça de Queirós
- Interactive map of the Secondary School Eça de Queirós area

General information
- Type: Secondary School
- Location: Póvoa de Varzim, Beiriz e Argivai, Póvoa de Varzim, Portugal
- Coordinates: 41°23′4″N 8°45′40.2″W
- Opened: 20th century
- Owner: Portuguese Republic

Technical details
- Material: Cement

Design and construction
- Architect: António José Pedroso

Website
- Official Site

The Secondary School Eça de Queirós (Portuguese: Escola Secundária Eça de Queirós) is a secondary school located in the civil parish of Póvoa de Varzim, Beiriz e Argivai, in the Portuguese Norte region, founded on 14 June 1904.
