= Escola Secundária Sá de Miranda =

Sá de Miranda Secondary School
- Escola Secundária Sá de Miranda
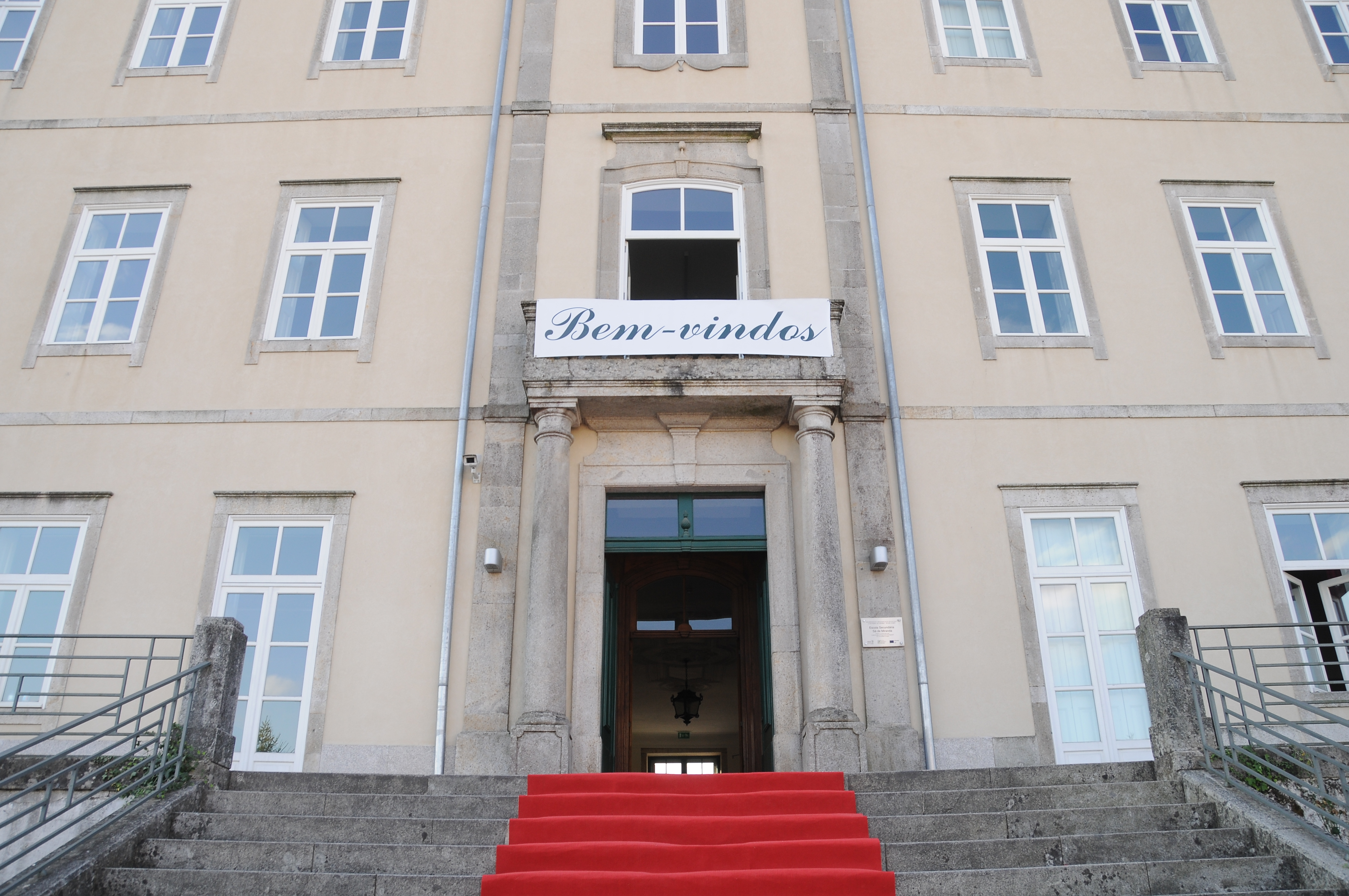
- The main historic facade of the old Nationalist Liceu of Braga
- Interactive map of the Sá de Miranda Secondary School area

General information
- Type: Secondary School
- Architectural style: Nationalist
- Location: Braga (São Vicente), Braga, Portugal
- Coordinates: 41°33′24.52″N 8°25′5.71″W
- Opened: November 17, 1836; 189 years ago
- Owner: Portuguese Republic

Technical details
- Material: Granite

Website
- www.aesamiranda.pt

The Sá de Miranda Secondary School (Portuguese: Escola Secundária Sá de Miranda), is a Portuguese public school in civil parish of São Vicente, in the municipality of Braga, in the northern district of Braga.

== History ==
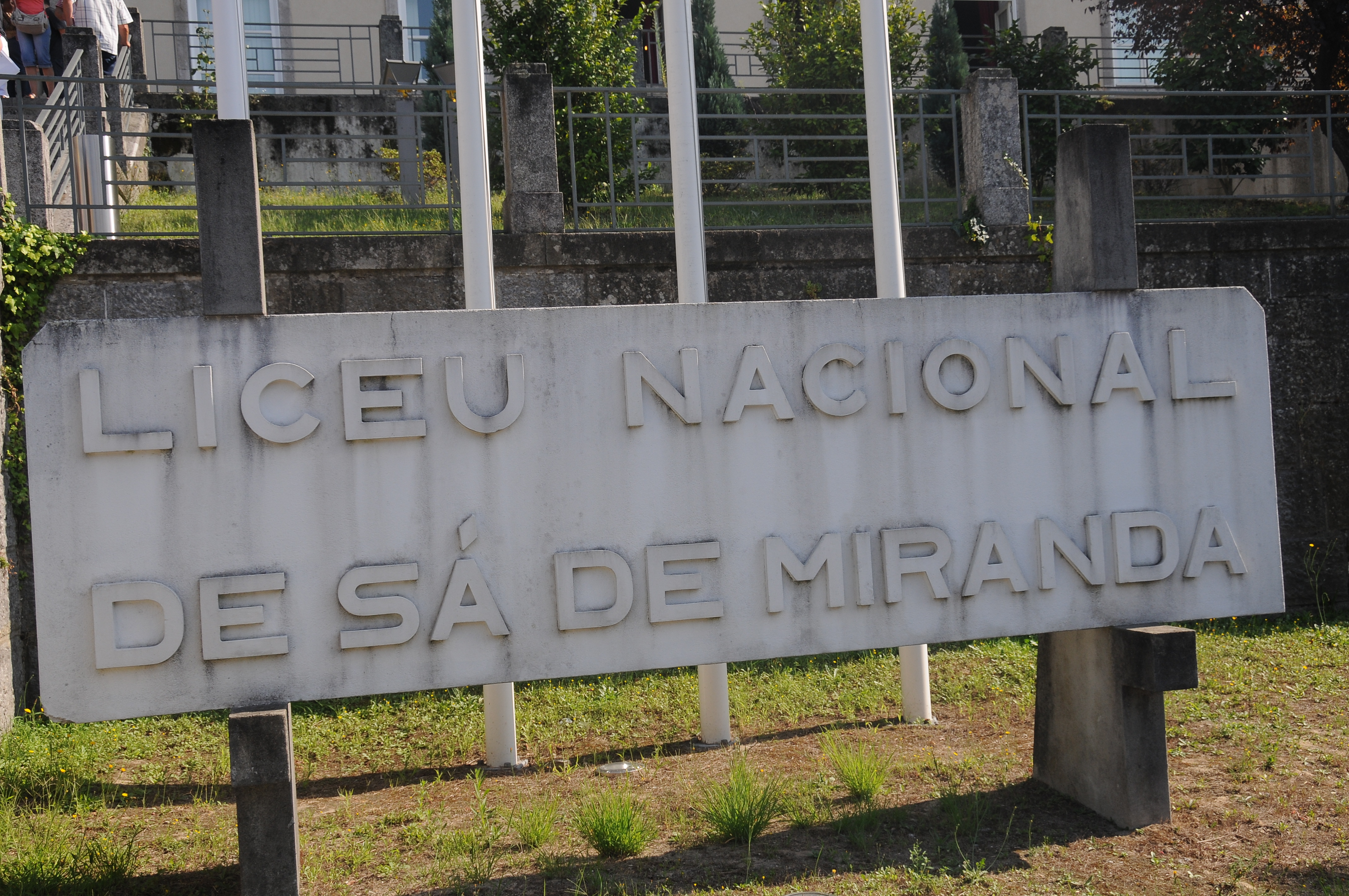
The main placard of the Sá Miranda Lyceum

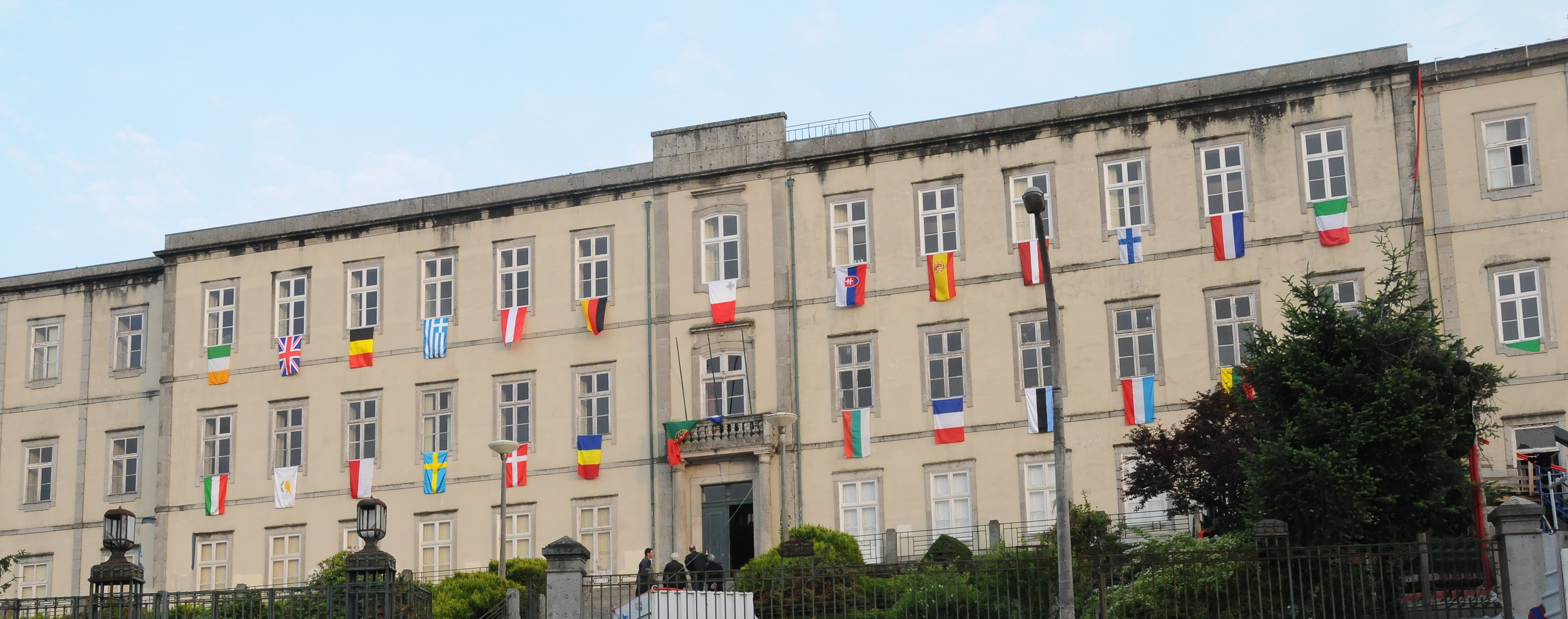
The monumental main facade of the nationalist block of the secondary school

On 17 November 1836, the law establishing the Liceu of Braga went into effect, supported by its founder Passos Manuel.

In 1841, part of the extinct Convento dos Congregados do Oratório (Oratory Congregates Convent), was incorporated into the State's possessions, with the expulsion of the religious orders in Portugal, decreed by the Liberal government in 1834. The building would be destined for the recently created educational system. Within a year, on 15 October 1845, the Liceu Nacional de Braga (National Lyceum of Braga) was inaugurated.

In 1912, the school was redesignated in honour of poet Francisco Sá de Miranda.

In 1921, the Colégio do Espírito do Santo, former-property of the Congregates (who were expelled following the installation of the First Portuguese Republic) was availed to become the new lyceum, owing to the inadequate primitive structures.

On 27 April 1928, a campaign began to adapt the spaces, which continued between 1929 and 1933.

Studies on the lyceum project in 1958 were carried-out by the Junta das Construções for technical and secondary instruction. As a consequence, in 1961, construction to adapt the installations in the internat annex of the lyceum and expansion of covered recreational spaces were carried out by the Serviços de Construção e de Conservação (Construction and Conservation Services).

== Architecture ==
The school is situated in the proximity of the Casa de Val Flores and the Villa Garden Hotel.

Its main body is dominated by a three-floor facade reconstructed in the Nationalist style.
