= Portugal =

Country in Southwestern Europe

Portuguese Republic República Portuguesa (Portuguese)
- Flag Coat of arms
- Anthem: A Portuguesa "The Portuguese"
- Location of Portugal Portugal within the European Union
- Capital and largest city: Lisbon; 38°46′N 9°9′W
- Official languages: Portuguese
- Recognised national languages: Portuguese Sign Language
- Recognised regional languages: Mirandese; Barranquenho
- Demonym: Portuguese
- Government: Unitary semi-presidential republic
  - President: António José Seguro
  - Prime Minister: Luís Montenegro
  - Assembly President: José Pedro Aguiar-Branco
- Legislature: Assembly of the Republic

Establishment
  - County: 868
  - Battle of São Mamede: 24 June 1128
  - Battle of Ourique: 25 July 1139
  - Conference of Zamora: 4–5 October 1143
  - Papal recognition: 23 May 1179 (Note: The modern day concept of sovereignty or declaration of independence did not exist at the time, nor was established any notion of its recognition. Portugal was recognised as a kingdom with its own King in 1179 by the Pope who was the ultimate authority in Europe at the time. The way Europe was seen at the time was as a Res publica christiana.)
  - Restoration: 1 December 1640
  - First constitution: 23 September 1822
  - Republic: 5 October 1910
  - Current constitution: 25 April 1976

Area
  - Total: 92,225 km^{2} (35,608 sq mi) (Note: Portugal's land area covers 92,225 km^{2} (35,608 mi^{2}), while the territory over which it exercises sovereignty—including land, internal waters, and the territorial sea—amounts to 156,597 km^{2} (60,462 mi^{2}).) (109th)
  - Water (%): 1.2 (2015)

Population
  - 2025 estimate: ▲11,424,031 (83rd)
  - 2021 census: ▼10,343,066
  - Density: 123.9/km^{2} (320.9/sq mi)
- GDP (PPP): 2026 estimate
  - Total: ▲$570.956 billion (51st)
  - Per capita: ▲$52,980 (43rd)
- GDP (nominal): 2026 estimate
  - Total: ▲$375.197 billion (47th)
  - Per capita: ▲$34,815 (41st)
- Gini (2025): ▼30.9 medium inequality
- HDI (2023): ▲0.890 very high (40th)
- Currency: Euro (€) (EUR)
- Time zone: UTC+0 and -1
  - Summer (DST): UTC+1 and +0
- Date format: yyyy-mm-dd
- Calling code: +351
- ISO 3166 code: PT
- Internet TLD: .pt

Portugal, (Note: European Portuguese pronunciation: [puɾtuˈɣal]) officially the Portuguese Republic, (Note: Portuguese: República Portuguesa, IPA: [rɛˈpuβlikɐ puɾtuˈɣez̻ɐ]) is a country in Southwestern Europe. Mainland Portugal is located on the southwestern portion of the Iberian Peninsula, and bordered by Spain to the north and east. Portugal also includes the archipelagos of Madeira and the Azores in the Atlantic Ocean. The country has a population of 11.4 million, and Lisbon, its capital, is the largest city. Portugal's internal waters and territorial sea together account for two-fifths of its territory, and its exclusive economic zone is one of Europe's largest. The country's terrain contains a diverse range of landscapes and regional climates.

The western Iberian Peninsula has been inhabited since prehistory, with the earliest signs of permanent settlement dating to between 5500 BC and 5300 BC. Muslims had occupied the Iberian Peninsula from 711. As a result of the Reconquista against them, Portugal was established as a county of the Kingdom of León in 868 and formally as a kingdom in 1179. During the Age of Discovery, the kingdom made several advancements in nautical science and maritime exploration to discover new territories and sea routes, which led to the establishment of the Portuguese Empire. The kingdom became a republic in 1910, before becoming a dictatorship in 1926, whose 1974 overthrow enabled democracy to be established in 1976.

Portugal is a unitary republic and multi-party representative democracy with four separate sovereignty organs: president, government, parliament, and judiciary. It has a unicameral national legislature known as the Assembly of the Republic (Assembleia da República). Portugal is divided into seven mainland regions and two autonomous overseas regions, though it remains a highly centralised country.

A developed country, Portugal has an advanced economy that chiefly relies upon services, industry, and tourism. Shaped by the various civilisations that have inhabited its territory, such as the Carthaginians and the Romans, Portugal developed a culture with a worldwide influence. This allowed Portuguese to become the world's fifth-most spoken native language, with more than 250 million native speakers. With a stable foreign policy shaped by its colonial and diplomatic history and location, Portugal is a member of multiple international organisations and forums.

== Etymology ==
The word Portugal derives from Latin Portus Cale, a Roman name meaning 'port of Cale', itself the origin of the name of the Portuguese city of Porto, while Cale was a town on the Douro. There is no consensus on the etymology of Cale. It could derive from the pre-Indo-European word Kala, meaning 'shelter' or 'refuge', passed into the Celtic language in the form Cale, with the meaning of 'land' or 'mountain'. The ethnonym Calaico/a then came from the Gallaeci, Celtic peoples of northwestern Iberia, and came to mean 'one of the land' or 'one of the place. During the Middle Ages, the region around Portus Cale became known by the Visigoths as Portucale and by the Suebi as Parochiale. The name Portucale evolved into Portugale; by the 11th and 12th centuries Portugal referred to the region between the Douro and Minho rivers.

== History ==
=== Prehistory ===
The region has been inhabited by humans since approximately 400,000 years ago. (Note: The earliest human trace found in Portugal is the 400,000-year-old Aroeira 3, a Homo heidelbergensis skull discovered in the Cave of Aroeira in 2014.) Neanderthals roamed the southwestern Iberian Peninsula until 37,000 years ago, and anatomically modern humans arrived in what is now Portugal around 40,000 years ago. The onset of the Neolithic in the area dates to between 5500 BC and 5300 BC. In southern Portugal, Iron Age inscribed stele have been found, representing early evidence of writing in the Iberian Peninsula. Pre-Celtic tribes originally from the Ukrainian steppes inhabited mainland Portugal and the Lusitanians occupied mostly central, inland regions in 1250 BC. Celts may have spread westwards in Iberia in the latter 1st millennium BC. Phoenicians colonised Portugal during the 7th and 8th centuries BC.

=== Antiquity and early Middle Ages ===
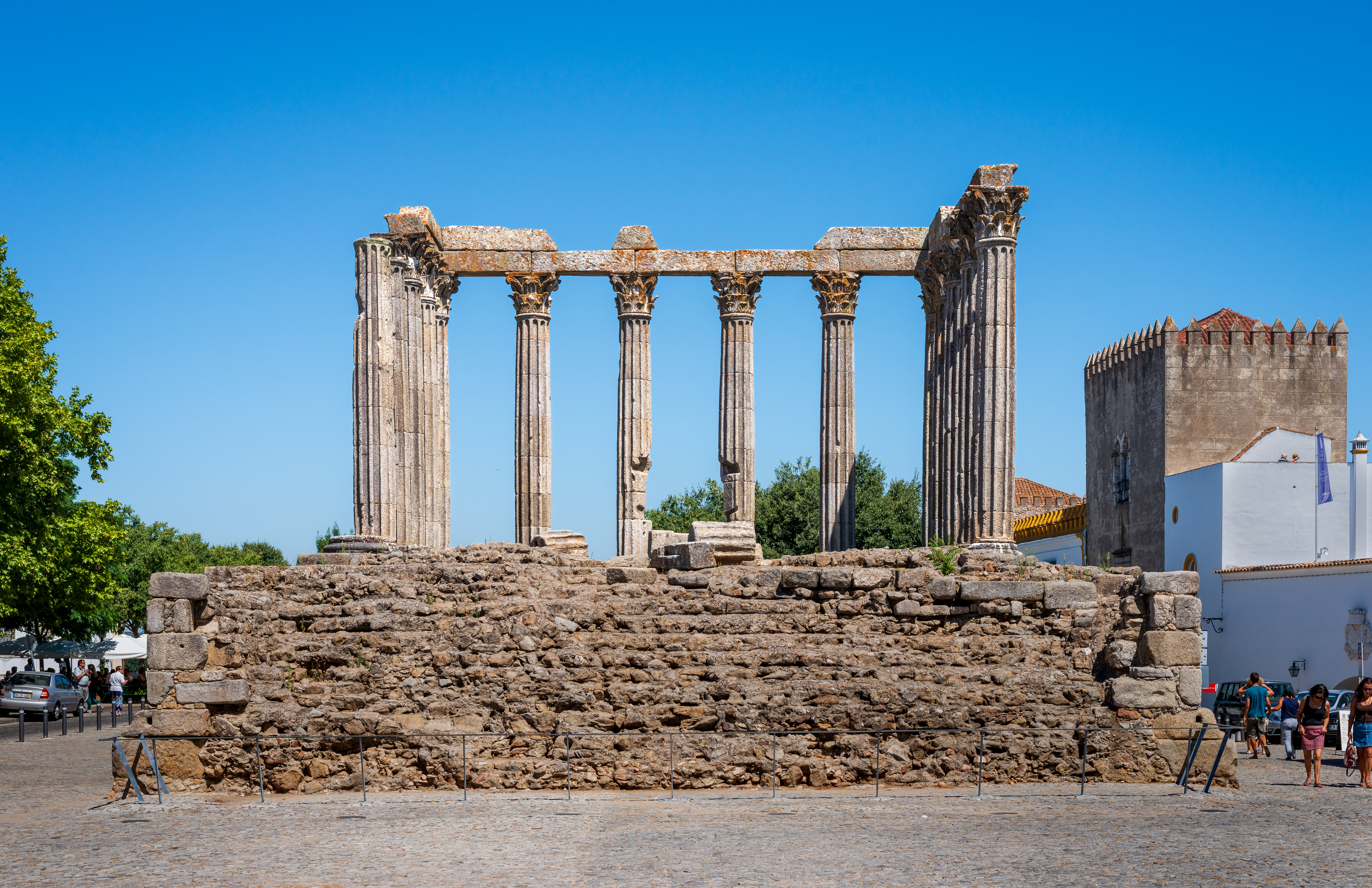
The Roman Temple of Évora, built in the 1st century

The Mediterranean coast was well known to the Carthaginians. Their close relations with Phoenician-Punic settlements and shared cultural ties likely gave them considerable political and economic influence there from the 6th or 5th century BC, alongside the establishment of unequal treaties with Iberian city-states. After Carthage's defeat by Rome in the First Punic War, it sought new western territories, culminating in the Barcid conquest of the Iberian Peninsula in 237 BC.

The Romans invaded the Iberian Peninsula in 218 BC and expelled the Carthaginians after the Battle of Ilipa in 206 BC. Within 200 years, mainland Portugal had been annexed by the Romans despite resistance from local tribes such as the Lusitanians under the leadership of Viriathus and other leaders.

In 409, with the decline of the Western Roman Empire, the Iberian Peninsula was invaded by Germanic tribes. Western Iberia was integrated into the Suebian Kingdom, with its capital in or near Braga. The Visigoths defeated the Suebi in 585 and ruled the peninsula until the early 8th century.

In 711, the Iberian Peninsula was invaded from the south by the Umayyad Caliphate, which expanded rapidly. By 716, present-day mainland Portugal was part of the Muslim Iberian territories known as al-Andalus. The Umayyad Caliphate ruled al-Andalus as a province until its independence in 756 under the Emirate of Córdoba, which in 929 gave way to a caliphate that lasted until it fragmented into states known as taifas, collapsing in 1031, and most of what is now central and southern Portugal falling under the Taifa of Badajoz. The taifas were conquered by Muslim forces from North Africa, first completely by the Almoravids by 1115, who were in turn followed by the Almohads in the 1140s. Northern incursions also occurred during this period, with Viking raids recorded from 844 into the 11th century.

=== Reconquista and independence ===
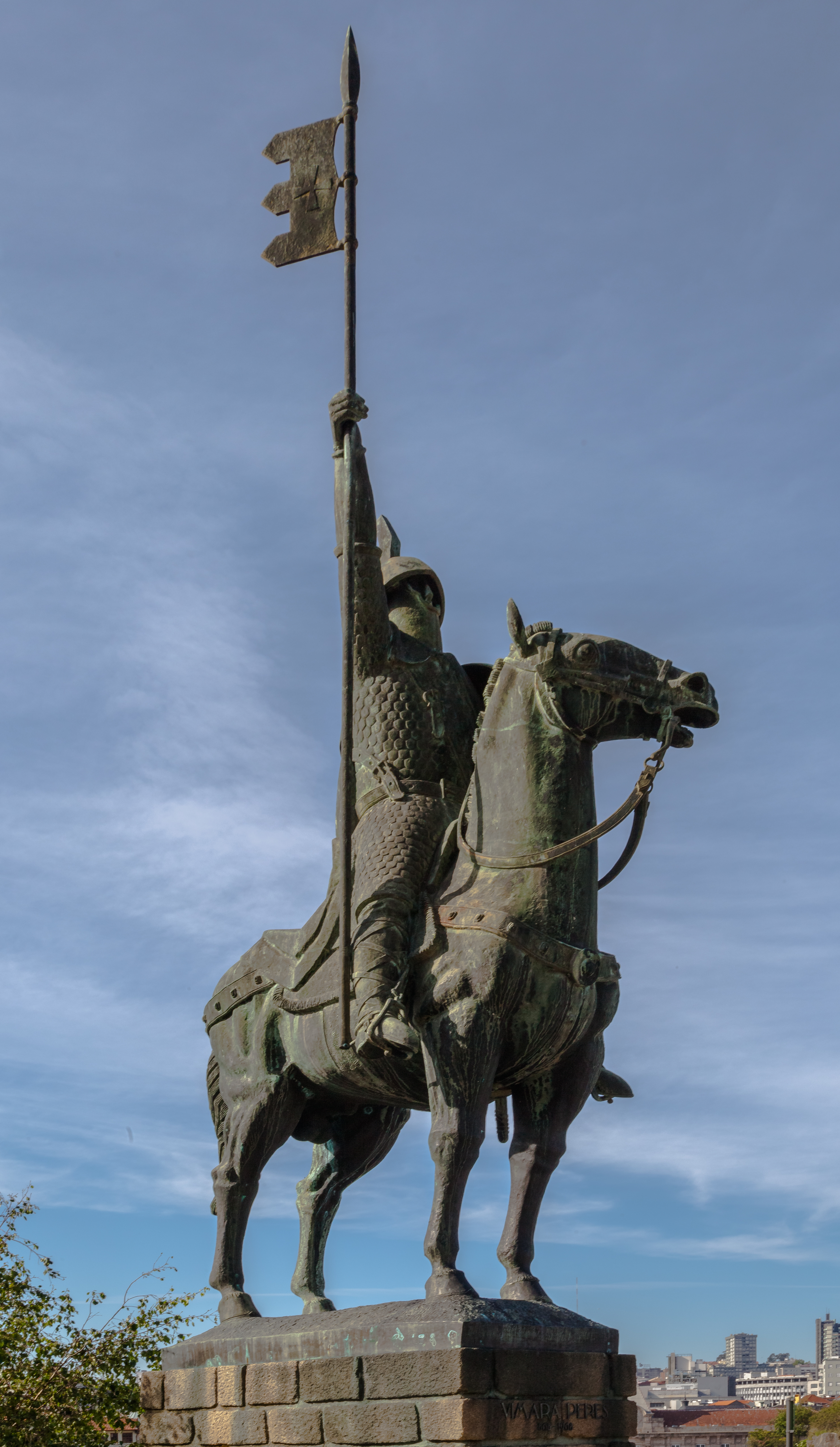
Vímara Peres

The Reconquista was a series of military and cultural campaigns by northern Iberian Christian polities against al-Andalus. The death of the Umayyad emir Abd ar-Rahman II in 852 brought an end to Umayyad efforts to extend authority northward. The discovery in the 830s of a tomb believed to be that of James the Great gave the Christians a powerful patron, and the elevation of Alfonso III of Asturias in the 860s ended a period of uncertain leadership, thereby providing the command required to channel this energy into a wave of expansionism southward. In 868, the region between the Minho and Douro rivers was secured from the Moors by Christian forces under Vímara Peres and constituted as the County of Portugal under him. The first county of Portugal lasted until 1071. In 1096, Alfonso VI of León refounded the county and bestowed it on Henry of Burgundy, who married Alfonso's illegitimate daughter, Teresa of León.

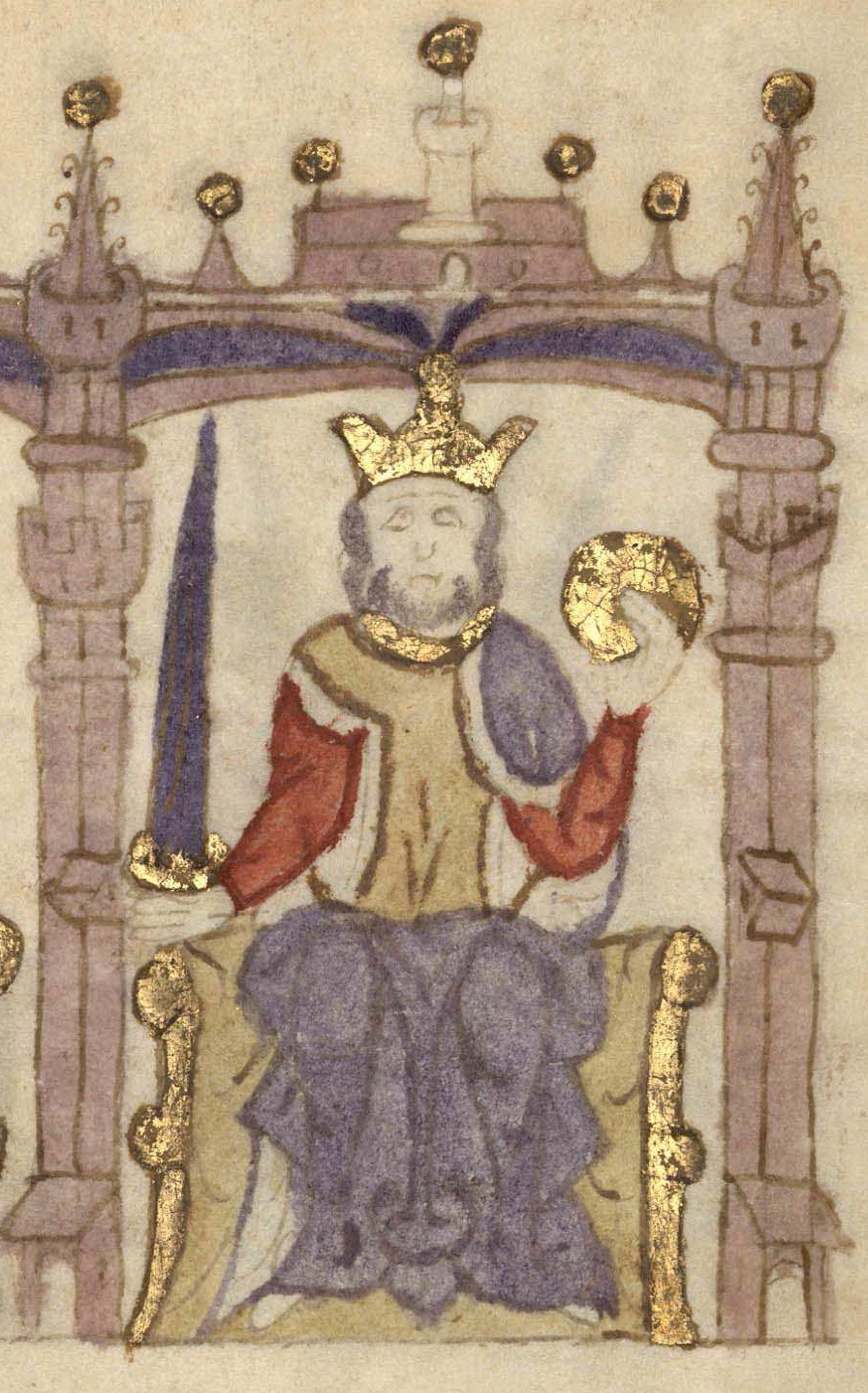
King Afonso I

After Count Henry's death in 1112, Teresa ruled Portugal as queen. Her close association from 1121 with Fernando Pérez de Traba, a Galician noble, alienated the local nobility, who sided with her son, Afonso Henriques, defeating her and her supporters at the Battle of São Mamede in 1128. The following year, Afonso claimed sole authority over the entire county, free from foreign influence. According to legend, he won the Battle of Ourique and took the title of King in 1139. (Note: There are five surviving 12th-century documents that refer to the Battle of Ourique, none of which mention any apparition of Christ to D. Afonso Henriques, the earliest such references appear in the 15th century. According to the historian Rodrigo Franco da Costa: "No document until the 15th century mentions the apparition of Christ to D. Afonso Henriques on the eve of the Battle of Ourique. Those that have been presented are not conclusive. There are, however, 'five' 12th century documents that refer to the battle — yet none of them mention the apparition, even though some narrate miracles. The first certain references to the miracle appear in the mid-15th century. Once it emerged, the legend gradually expanded until it acquired its definitive form in the writers of the sixteenth century ... We therefore have, on one side, the silence of the three centuries closest to the battle concerning the miracle of the apparition, and on the other, the late appearance of the legend under circumstances that point to an evolutionary process. It should also be noted that, according to the 16th century version, Christ did not merely appear and promise victory — He also prophesied the future destinies of Portugal. Thus, the contemporaries of the conquering king supposedly received from God Himself the titles legitimizing the new monarchy and the guarantee of its glorious future. Yet it is precisely this fact of the divine foundation of Portugal — the most important fact of all for the Portuguese — about which everyone remains silent, while they do speak of the battle that supposedly occurred.") Afonso's claim was implicitly recognised by Alfonso VII of León at the Conference of Zamora in 1143, and by Pope Alexander III in 1179 through the papal bull Manifestis Probatum. (Note: Unlike popular belief, there are no surviving documents indicating that a treaty was signed at Zamora in 1143 recognising Portugal's status as a kingdom by the Kingdom of León. Historian Bernard F. Reilly states that "In October he invited Afonso Henriques to a conference at Zamora. The Leonese monarch wished not only to secure his own border with Portugal in the coming months but also to obtain the collaboration of his cousin in simultaneous attacks on the Almoravids and he was willing to make the greatest concessions to achieve such cooperation. The evidence for what transpired between the two at Zamora is certainly less than we should wish. In the first instance, it consists in two royal charters, one to a Martin Cidez and another to Pons de Cabrera (D458-59). Although the Portuguese ruler does not appear as a confirmant of either he is cited in the dating formula of both. They speak of the Council of Valladolid celebrated by Cardinal Guido and of the 'king of Portugal' who came to hold a conference with the emperor. Since the charters were drafted by Alfonso VII's chancery, the recognition of the new royal status of Afonso Henriques is implicit.")

With the support of north-European crusaders and Christian military and religious orders, Afonso Henriques and his successors continued pushing south until the capture of Algarve, the southernmost region of mainland Portugal, which was recognised by the Kingdom of Castile as Portuguese territory in 1267. With minor readjustments, Portugal's borders have largely remained the same since the signing of the Treaty of Alcañices between Denis of Portugal and Fernando IV of Castile in 1297. Between the 14th and early 15th century, Portugal was struck by several outbreaks of the plague, civil wars, invasions, famines, and natural disasters that led to a population decrease and labour shortages. The period also saw a rise in antisemitism.

=== Age of Discovery ===
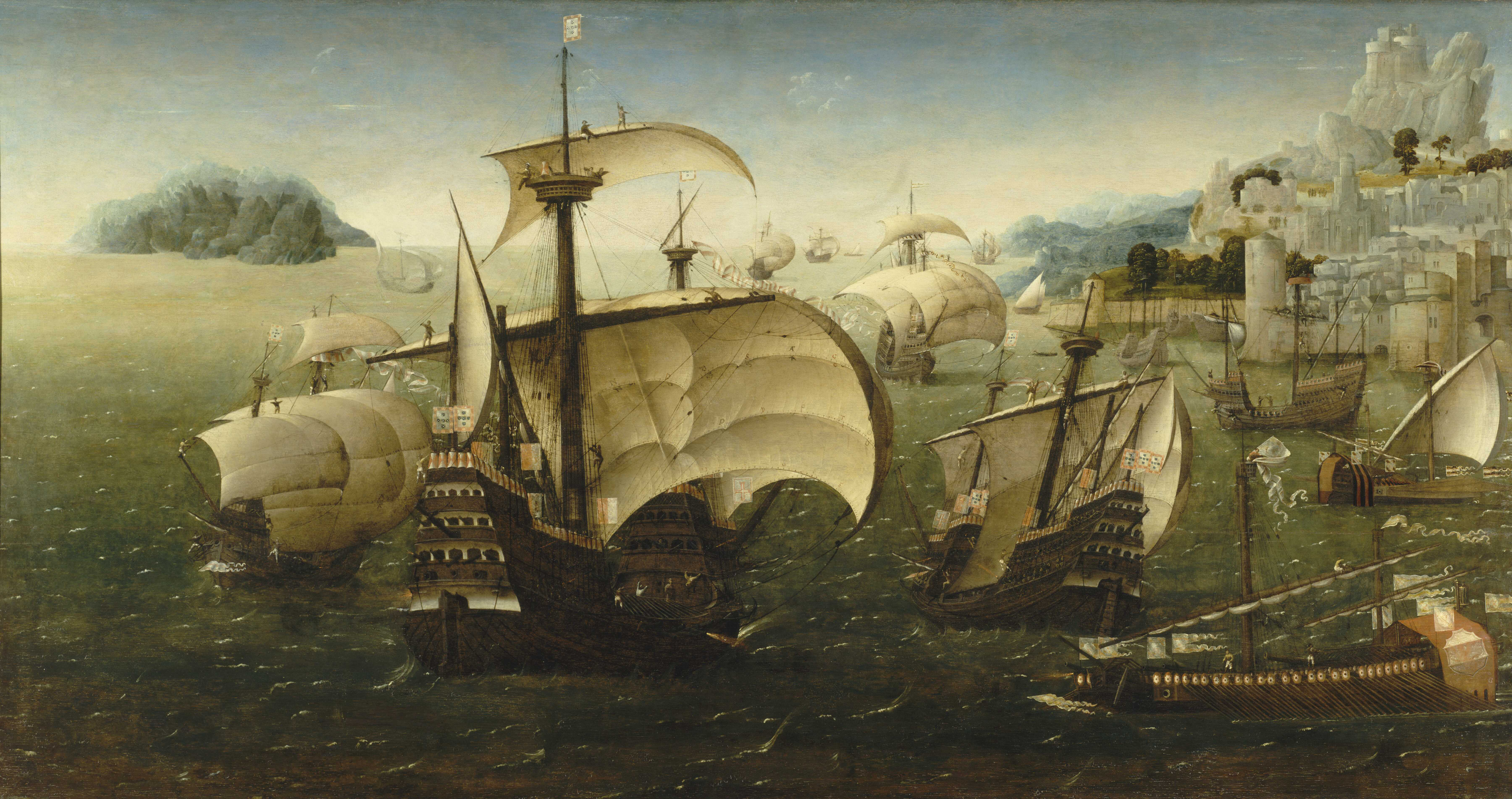
The Portuguese Carracks Off a Rocky Coast painting displays Portuguese vessels of the Age of Discovery during the 16th century.

After King Ferdinand I’s death in 1383, his minor daughter Beatrice became his legal successor under the regency of Leonor Teles. Leonor's unpopularity triggered a crisis compounded by fears that the marriage between Beatrice and John I of Castile could lead to the loss of Portugal's independence. In 1385, John of Aviz, a royal bastard and brother of Ferdinand, was elected king and later defeated the Castilians in the Battle of Aljubarrota consolidating the House of Aviz's rule over the country. In 1386, during his reign, Portugal cemented its alliance with England with the signing of the Treaty of Windsor, making it the oldest standing alliance in the world. The dynasty contributed to the conditions for Portugal's maritime expansion, elevating it in European politics and culture. Portugal acquired its first colonies by conquering the town of Ceuta on the North African coast in 1415. Portugal was among the first to start the Age of Discovery, (Note: The concept of discovery that applies to Portuguese overseas activities in the 15th and 16th centuries emerged in the Treaty of Alcáçovas. After the 1480s it became the main criterion for territorial claims. Before then, Portuguese expansion centred on conquest, religious war, and forced conversion. Prior to the treaty, documents made no reference to discovery.) and its scientific advances influenced other European countries' overseas expansions.

Portugal was the first and the last colonial power in the era of modern European colonialism, (Note: Portugal's colonial empire endured from the conquest of Ceuta in 1415 to the handover of Macau in 1999. Historian L. Veracini states that Portugal was the first and the last explicitly colonial power.) and by the mid-16th century it controlled a network of possessions stretching from Lisbon to Japan and Timor through Brazil. Throughout the 15th and 16th centuries, Portuguese explorers sailed the coast of Africa, established trading posts for commodities especially gold and slaves, explored the Indian Ocean and eastern Asia, and established trade routes in most of southern Asia, taxing most trade criss-crossing the Indian Ocean. However, by the 16th century its enterprise in Asia was already in decline. The 1494 Treaty of Tordesillas divided newly encountered non-European territories between Portugal and Spain along a meridian west of Cape Verde, while the 1529 Treaty of Zaragoza extended this partition to the Pacific Ocean.

In 1498, Vasco da Gama reached India by sea, and two years later Pedro Álvares Cabral landed in Brazil and claimed it for Portugal. During the 15th century, Portugal established the transatlantic slave-trade circuits and, by the mid-19th century, had become one of the longest-active and a significant participant in the Atlantic slave trade.

=== Iberian Union and Restoration ===
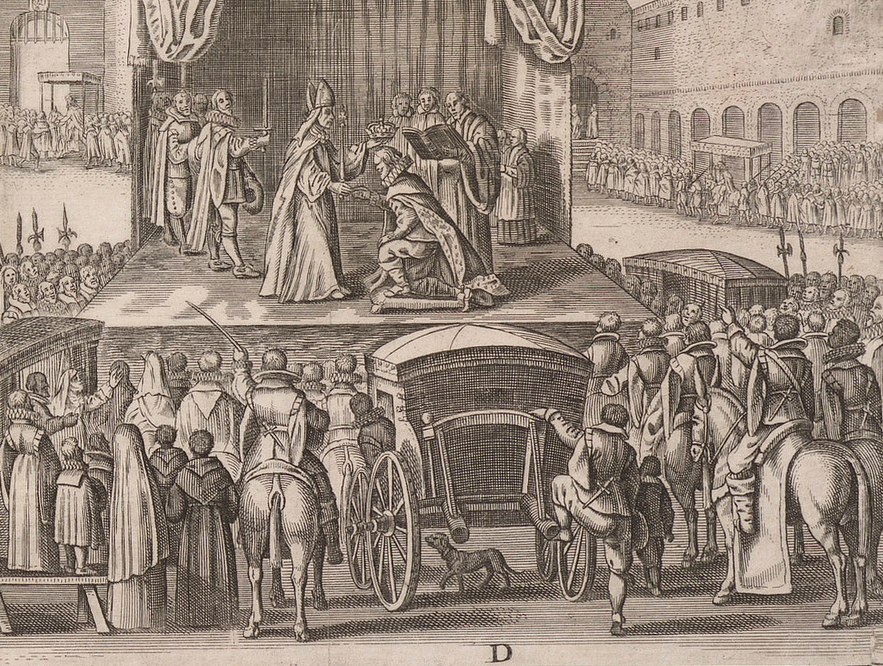
The coronation of King John IV in Lisbon

The 1578 death of King Sebastian in battle and the subsequent 1580 death of King Henry without a named heir, precipitated a succession crisis. Philip II of Spain, whose mother was Isabella of Portugal, was one of the candidates for the throne. In 1581 he was acclaimed king of Portugal, creating a personal union between the two kingdoms. This deprived Portugal of an independent foreign policy and led to the Dutch-Portuguese War.

In 1641, John, Duke of Braganza, was proclaimed king by the Cortes after an uprising led by some nobles in the year before, ending the Iberian Union under the House of Habsburg, and beginning the rule of the House of Braganza. In 1668, following the Portuguese Restoration War, Spain recognised Afonso VI as king of Portugal. During the reign of John V from 1706 to 1750, the large influx of Brazilian gold into the royal treasury, chiefly through the royal fifth, produced a resource curse that weakened industry and cereal production, created a gold rush from Portugal to Brazil, and led to prolonged economic stagnation, permanent reduction of income growth, and the interruption of the institutional and economic progress achieved in the 17th century.

After the depletion of gold revenues, Portugal was left with a weak industrial base and backward institutional and educational structures. This condition was exacerbated by Sebastião José de Carvalho e Melo, 1st Marquis of Pombal, who emerged as the country's de facto ruler in the aftermath of the 1755 earthquake and tsunami, one of the kingdom's worst recorded natural disaster. Pombal's industrialisation efforts failed, and his education policies weakened human-capital formation. The expulsion of the Jesuits reduced student numbers and contributed to Portugal's decline in literacy. Pombal's instrumentalisation of the Inquisition for political purposes helped to entrench an extractive system that outlasted his rule. The nature of the existing political institutions contributed to Portugal's sustained divergence from Western Europe despite comparable family values and high state capacity, with partial recovery beginning from around the mid-20th century.

=== Constitutional monarchy ===
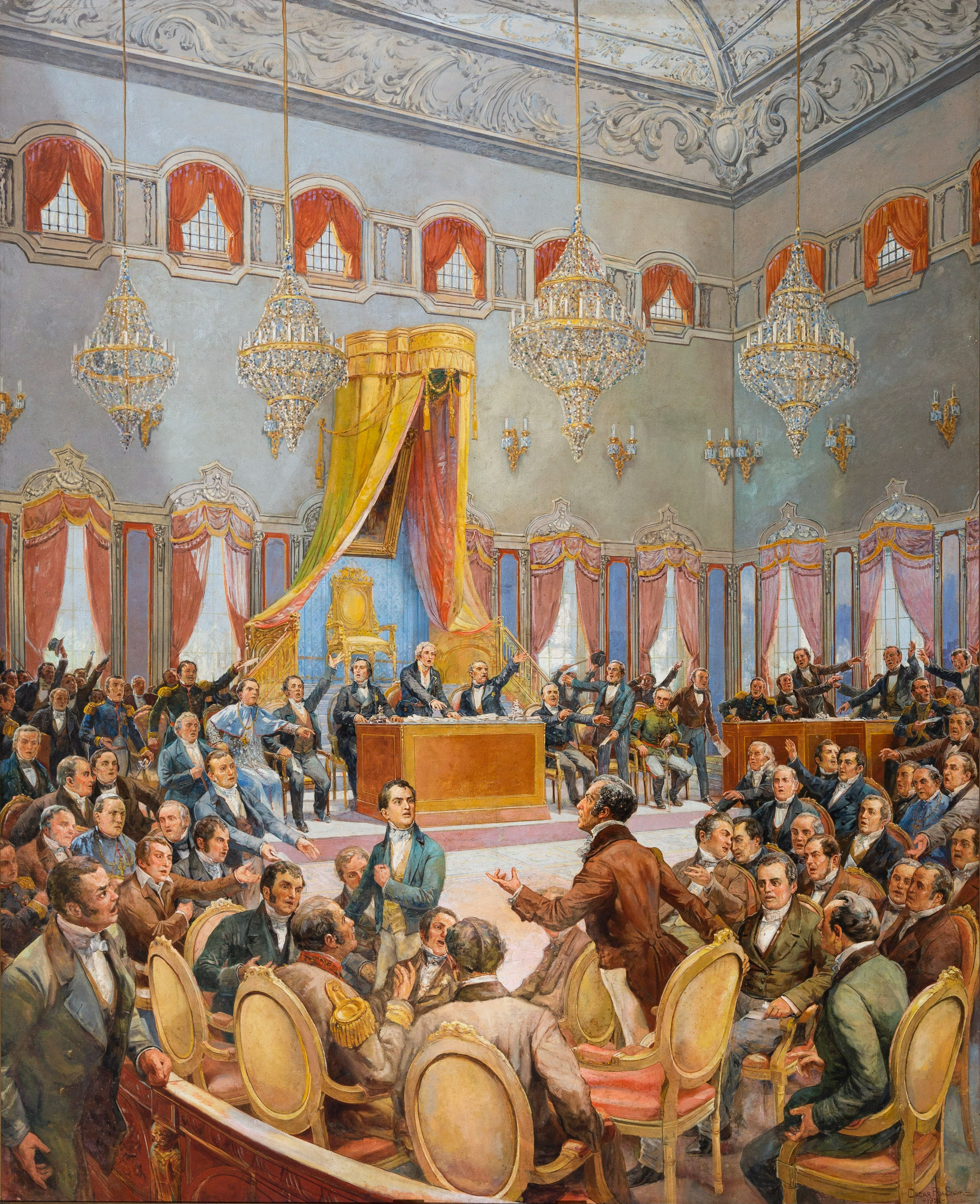
The Constituent Cortes of 1820 approved the first constitution of Portugal.

In 1807, Portugal refused Napoleon's demand to join the Continental System of embargo against the United Kingdom; an invasion led by General Junot followed, and Lisbon was captured in 1807. During the Napoleonic invasions, the Portuguese royal family transferred the court to Rio de Janeiro, in Brazil, making it the capital between 1808 and 1821, while control over mainland Portugal was handed over to the British. British intervention in the Peninsular War helped expel all French troops by 1812.

In 1820, an uprising in Porto against British rule under William Beresford, 1st Viscount Beresford, sought to establish a constitution for Portugal, forcing the return of King John VI and his court to mainland Portugal in 1821. By 1822, a new Constitution had been adopted, the outcome of a process marked by efforts for compromise and consensus that allowed absolutist forces to regain strength, which led to Miguelist counter-revolts against liberalism and prompted Prince Miguel's exile. After John VI's death in 1826, his eldest son, Pedro I of Brazil, briefly reigned as Pedro IV of Portugal, granted the 1826 Charter, and abdicated in favour of his minor daughter, Maria da Glória, on the condition that she marry Miguel, who was appointed regent. Although Miguel's return was under the condition of swearing allegiance to the Charter, he soon dismantled liberal institutions and was proclaimed king in 1828, leading to the Liberal Wars, after which Pedro forced Miguel's abdication in favour of Maria and his exile causing absolutist ideology to wane.

Under the constitutional monarchy, the country faced economic crises, political instability, and several coups d'état. Portugal's African colonial expansion culminated in the 1890 British Ultimatum, which thwarted its ambitions. The ultimatum and the 1891 Anglo-Portuguese Treaty, compounded by existing turmoil, led to political erosion and weakened the monarchy.

=== First Republic and Estado Novo ===
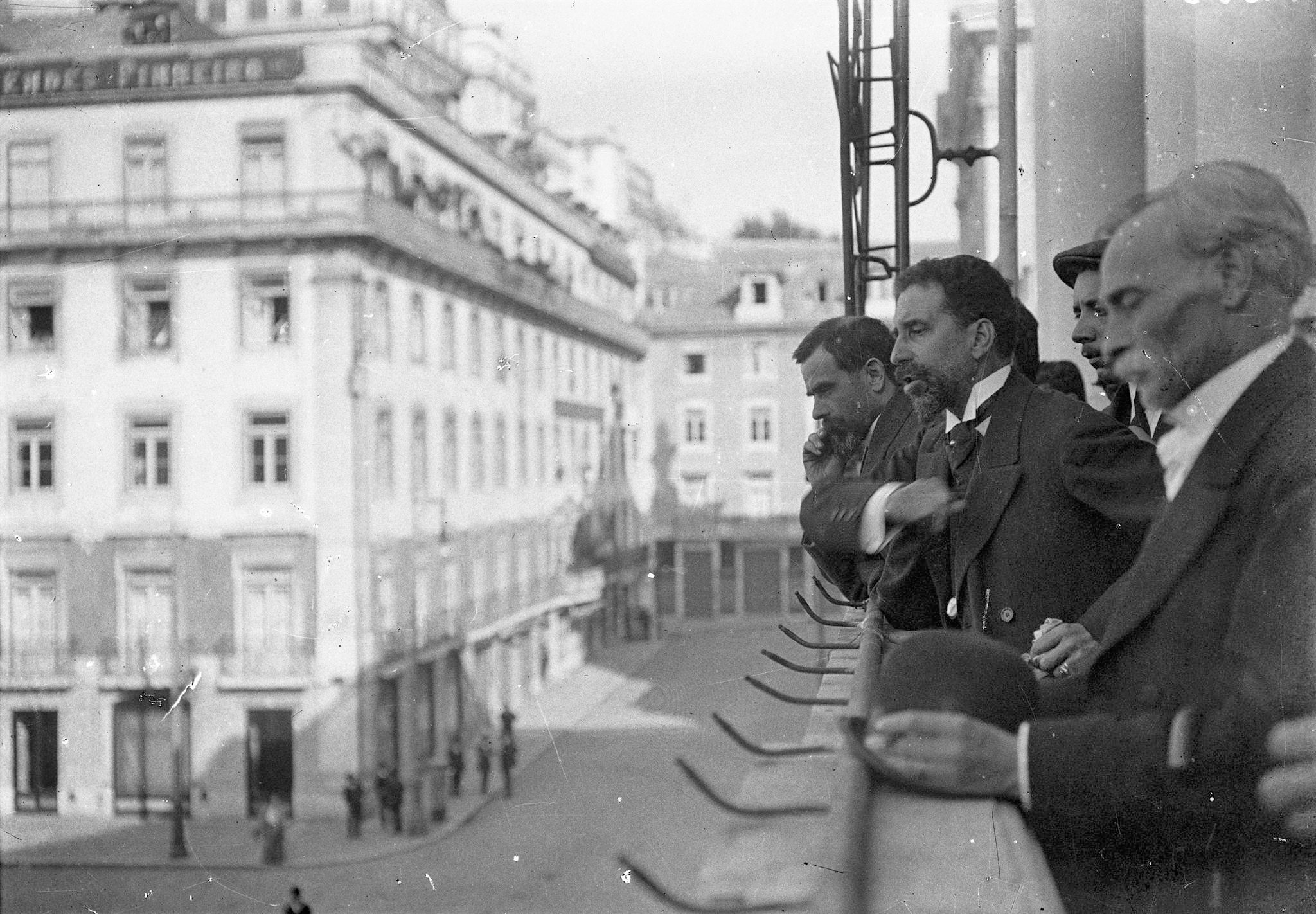
José Relvas proclaiming the republic on 5 October 1910, at Lisbon City Hall

In 1908, King Carlos I and Luís Filipe, Prince Royal, were assassinated by republican partisans. In 1910, the monarchy was replaced with a republic. During World War I, Portugal fought for the Allies. The war increased political instability and deepened the economic crisis creating further chaos and unrest during the First Republic. These conditions led to the overthrow of the Republic in 1926 and the establishment of the Ditadura Militar, later the Ditadura Nacional, which evolved into the authoritarian nationalist corporative dictatorship of the Estado Novo in 1933, under António de Oliveira Salazar.

During the Estado Novo, Portugal remained neutral in World War II, after which the postwar end of colonial legitimacy and the growth of the existing independence movements, rooted in the Great Depression, increasingly challenged Portuguese rule overseas. From the 1940s onward, the regime tightened colonial control and enlarged the overseas administration, raising costs and delaying inefficient development programmes. It kept a fragmented customs and economic empire that favoured the metropole. The regime kept policies meant to hold the colonies, including forced labour until 1961 and settlement schemes serving metropolitan economic, social, and strategic purposes. Indigenous peoples, already second-class citizens, saw limited improvements in living conditions. This further fuelled nationalist movements, ultimately leading to the Portuguese Colonial War from 1961 to 1974.

=== Return to democracy ===
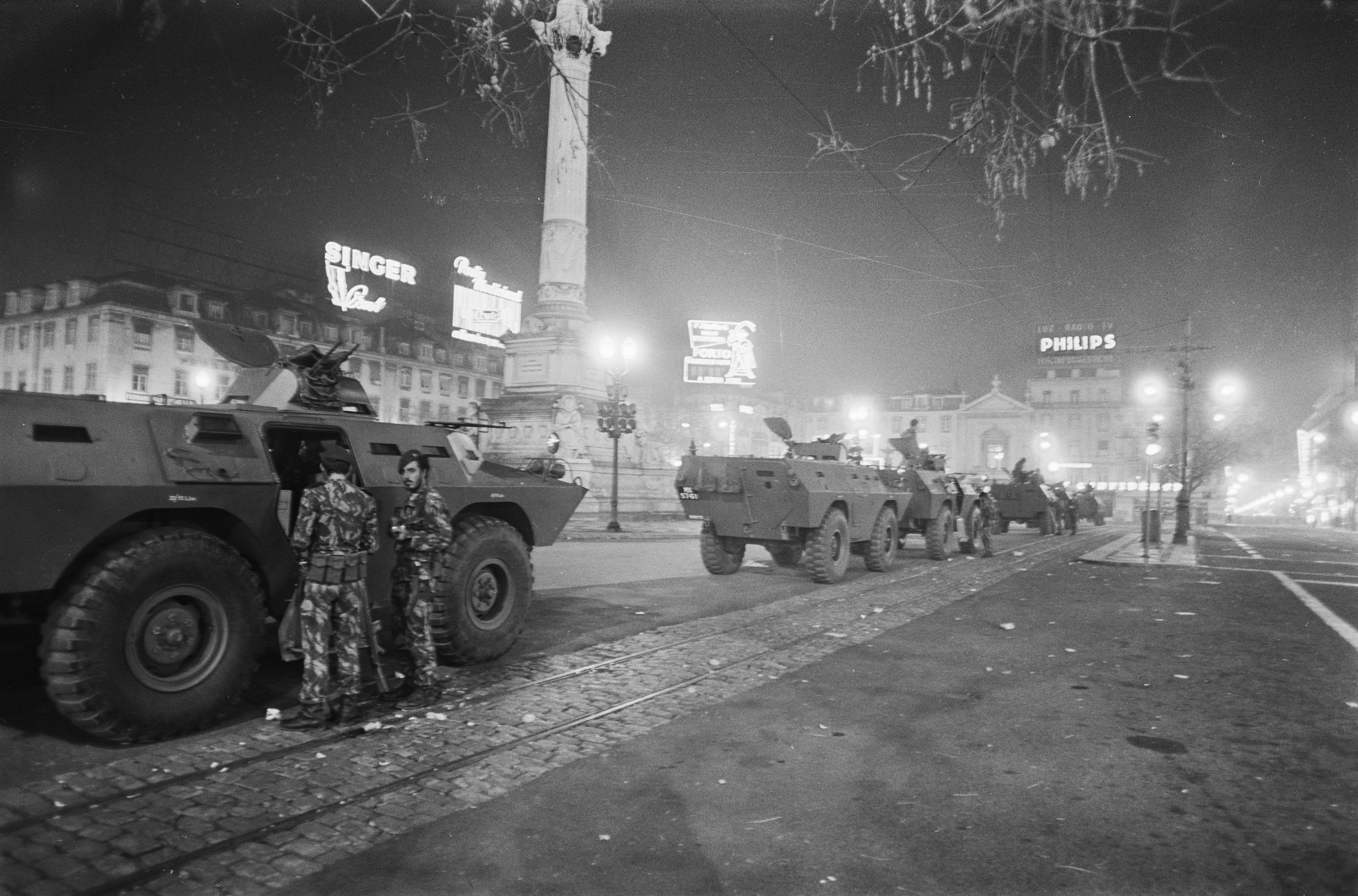
Armoured vehicles in Lisbon's Rossio Square, in 1975

In 1974, a military coup overthrew the Estado Novo regime, and started the Carnation Revolution. This initiated the transition to democracy and the dissolution of Portugal's colonial empire, from the independence of the African colonies to the handover of Macau to China in 1999. This period was marked by social, military, and political turmoil that culminated in street politics and violence and led Portugal to near civil war. The 1975 coup cleared the way for the approval of a new constitution and the holding of elections, beginning to subside tensions.

After the revolution, in the late 1970s and throughout the 1980s, under the influence of new economic insights, Portugal set about dismantling socialist policies from that period and moving towards neoliberalism. In 1986, Portugal joined the European Economic Community (EEC), which introduced structural reforms. This led in the 1990s to considerable economic growth driven by credit-fuelled consumer spending and a sharp rise in private indebtedness. Together with the growth of the financial and non-tradable sectors, this contributed to macroeconomic imbalances and paved the way for economic stagnation after the 2000s. It ultimately led to the 2010–2014 Portuguese financial crisis resulted in an international bailout and intense austerity policies, causing social tension.

== Geography ==
A topographic map of Portugal

Portugal's territory comprises mainland Portugal and the Azores and Madeira archipelagos. The mainland, commonly referred to as Continental Portugal, is located in the southwest of the Iberian Peninsula in Southwestern Europe, while Madeira and the Azores lie in the Atlantic Ocean. Portugal's land area is 92,225 km^{2} (35,608 sq mi), although Portuguese law defines the country's size as 156,597 km^{2} (60,462 sq mi) which includes about 64,000 km^{2} (24,711 sq mi) of ocean waters. (Note: The territory of Portugal includes its land, internal waters, and territorial sea.) Portugal's exclusive economic zone extends 1,727,408 km^{2} (666,956 mi^{2}), making it one of the largest in the European Union. The country is over two-thirds wilderness, almost one-fourth agricultural, and the remainder human settlements. Portugal's highest point is the summit of Mount Pico, located on Pico Island in the Azores, which rises to an elevation of 2,351 m (7,713 ft) above sea level. (Note: The highest peak in mainland Portugal is Torre in Serra da Estrela, at an elevation of 1,993 metres (6,539 ft).)

Portugal can be divided into four morphostructural units: the Hesperian Massif, which occupies most of mainland Portugal; the sedimentary borderlands of the massif, forming the Lusitanian and Algarve basins; the Lower Tagus and Alvalade sedimentary basins; and the volcanic submarine ranges that form the Azores and Madeira. Its geological and geomorphological features are largely the product of the Variscan, responsible for the formation of the Hesperian Massif, and later the Tethys–Atlantic cycle, responsible for the remaining units.

Regional tectonic processes affected the morphostructural units of mainland Portugal in varying ways, producing topography variations that subdivide the territory into ten regional geomorphological units. These units were shaped by the differing regional impacts of Cenozoic tectonics, climatic asymmetries in the Paleogene, Neogene, and Quaternary, and varied lithological responses to tectonic activity and climatic variability.

Continental Portugal is predominantly low-altitude, with over 70% of the territory lying below 400 m (1,300 ft) and less than 12% rising above 700 m (2,300 ft) of elevation. Its geography is structured by the Tagus River, which enters from Spain and flows into the Tagus Estuary. 95% of areas exceeding 400 m (1,300 ft) are situated to the north of the river, while the regions south of the Tagus, encompassing Alentejo and the Algarve, have 62% of the lands below 200 m (660 ft). The territory north of the Tagus is marked by mountains and plateaus incised by river valleys, whereas the south is distinguished by rolling plains.

The Madeira archipelago comprises the islands of Madeira and Porto Santo, together with the Desertas and Savage Islands, all of which are of volcanic origin. Approximately one-third of Madeira Island lies above 1,000 metres (3,300 ft) in elevation, and its landscape is characterised by a dense network of deep valleys with slopes rising several hundred metres, as well as streams that originate in the island's centre and diverge towards the coast, sustained by abundant rainfall. The steep gradient and very high rainfall is a cause of flash floods with high sediment transport.

The Azores is an archipelago composed of nine volcanic islands which, from west to east, are Flores, Corvo, Faial, Pico, São Jorge, Graciosa, Terceira, São Miguel, and Santa Maria. The islands retain much of their volcanic landforms, most visibly in volcanic cones and in the lakes that shape the scenery of the islands especially São Miguel, Flores, Terceira, Pico, and Corvo. Although rainfall is abundant, most streams in the Azores are temporary. The small size of the catchments, the slopes' steepness, and deforestation accentuates the torrential regime of the rivers during periods of intense precipitation causing erosion problems and floods.

=== Climate ===
The Köppen climate types of Portugal's
terrain

The climate of mainland Portugal and Madeira, together with their surrounding waters, is Mediterranean, whereas the Azores and its adjacent waters mainly have a temperate oceanic climate. Portugal's terrain has a diverse variety of regional climates for its size. The average temperature in Portugal varies from 4–20 °C (39.2–68.0 °F) in the mainland, around 18 °C (64.4 °F) in the Azores, and 9–19 °C (48.2–66.2 °F) in Madeira.

The Iberian Peninsula is located at the southern margin of the temperate zone and at the northern margin of the subtropical high-pressure zone. Additionally, Portugal's climate is influenced by the seasonal latitudinal shift of the jet stream, which directly impacts the trajectory of the polar front. Typically in the winter, the jet stream moves southwards and Portugal comes under the influence of the polar front, producing colder temperatures. When the polar front moves northward, Portugal comes under the influence of the Azores High bringing atmospheric stability during the summer. Upwelling occurs at the coast creating the Nortada, a summer wind along the coast.

Wildfires are a serious challenge in Portugal, with nearly 30% of those recorded in 2024 having an undetermined origin and arson accounting for almost five-sixths of the total burned area. Between 2014 and 2024, Portugal recorded an annual average of 12,496 fires and 112,455 ha (434 sq mi) burned, making it the European Union country with both the highest average number of wildfires and the greatest average burned area over that period. The effects of Climate change are projected to raise average temperatures in Portugal by as much as 3–4 °C (37.4–39.2 °F) by 2100 relative to the 1990s–2010s average, with impacts in water, ecosystem, agriculture, health, and security.

=== Biodiversity ===
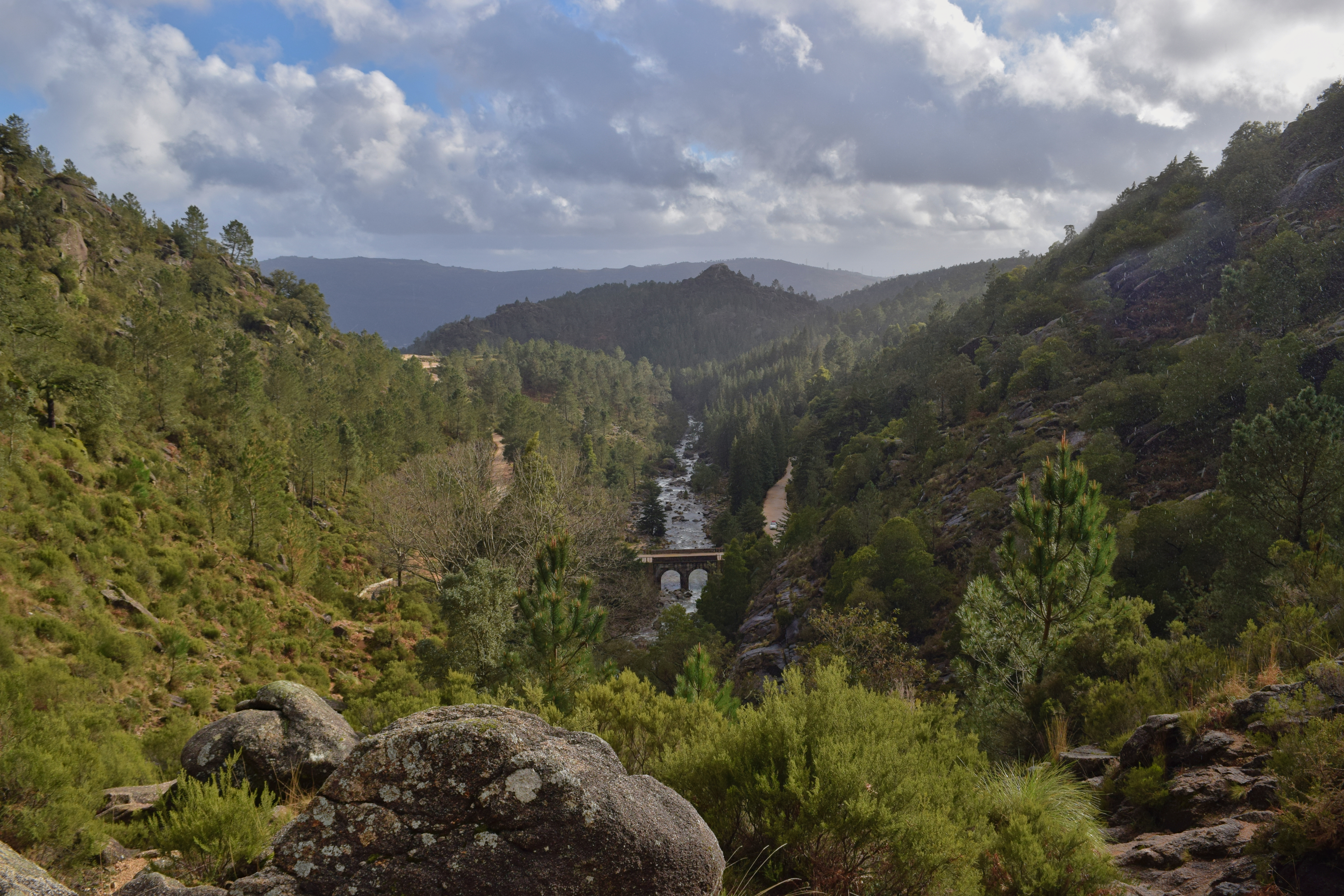
The Peneda-Gerês National Park in Northern Portugal is the only national park in Portugal.

Portugal is located in the Mediterranean basin, a biodiversity hotspot. It is home to six terrestrial ecoregions: Azores temperate mixed forests, Cantabrian mixed forests, Madeira evergreen forests, Iberian sclerophyllous and semi-deciduous forests, Northwest Iberian montane forests, and Southwest Iberian Mediterranean sclerophyllous and mixed forests. Almost a quarter of its land area is included in the Natura 2000 network. Native species such as holm oak, cork oak, stone pine, and maritime pine make up 72% of the total forested area of continental Portugal.

Portugal and Spain have a higher proportion of endemic freshwater fish species than elsewhere in Europe, at 73%. Among Portugal's protected areas are the Southwest Alentejo and Vicentine Coast Natural Park, one of Europe's last remaining stretches of wild coastline, and Montesinho Natural Park, which preserves one of the few intact Mediterranean mountain landscapes.

Geographical and climatic conditions facilitate the spread of invasive plant species. Over one-fourth of extant plant species in continental Portugal are exotic. Portugal has one of the highest numbers of threatened animal and plant species in Europe. Portugal is an important stopover for migratory birds, as its wetlands serve as key wintering and stopover sites for many waders due to their location on the East Atlantic Flyway. Some mammalian species and subspecies of Portugal such as red deer, Iberian ibex, wild boar, red fox, Iberian wolf, and Iberian lynx were once widespread throughout the country, but intense hunting, habitat degradation, and growing pressure from agriculture and livestock largely reduced their populations in the 19th and 20th centuries. There are three mammalian species and subspecies, such as the Portuguese ibex that became extinct, but some mammalian species, such as the Iberian hare, have been re-expanding their native range.

== Government and politics ==
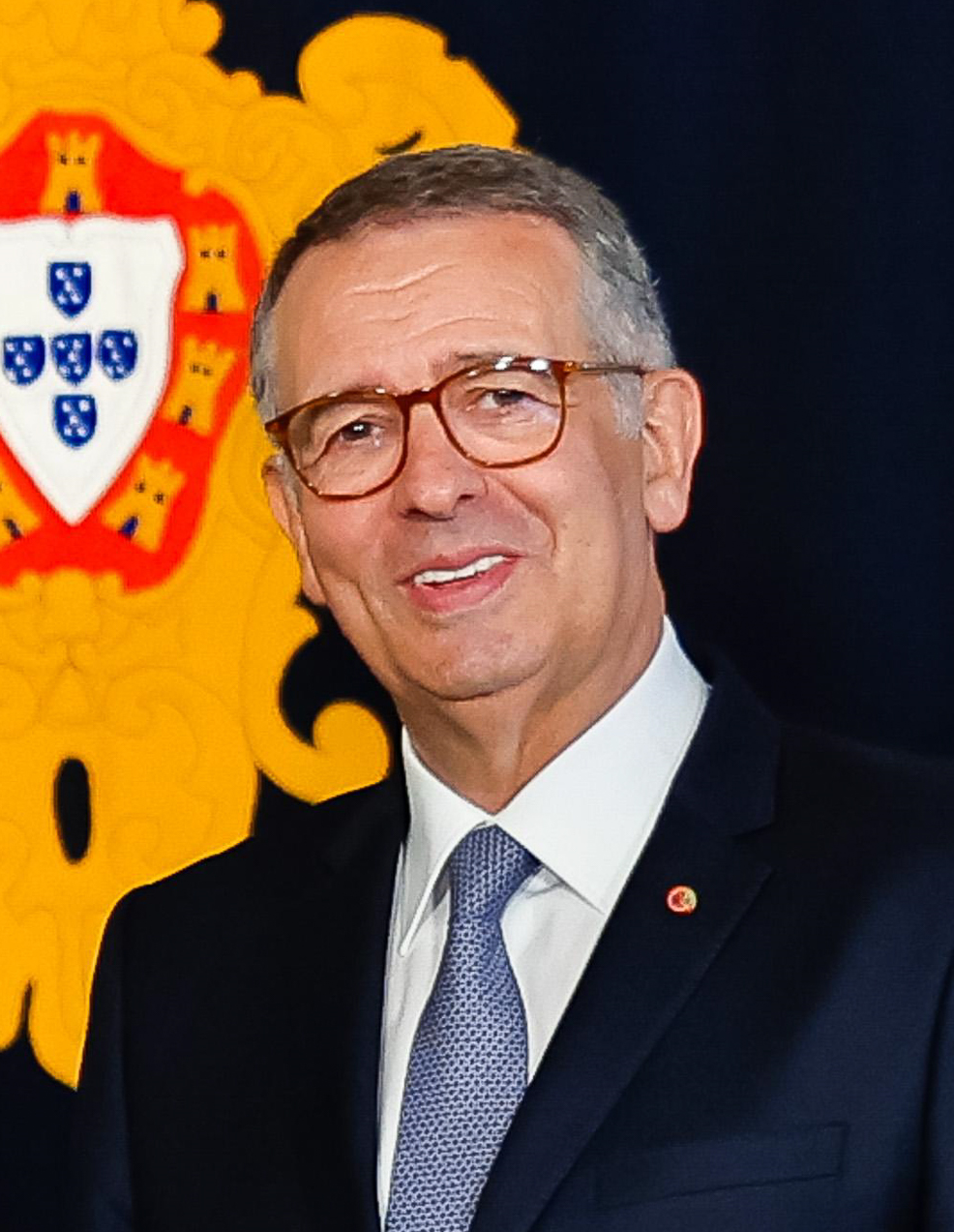
António José Seguro
President

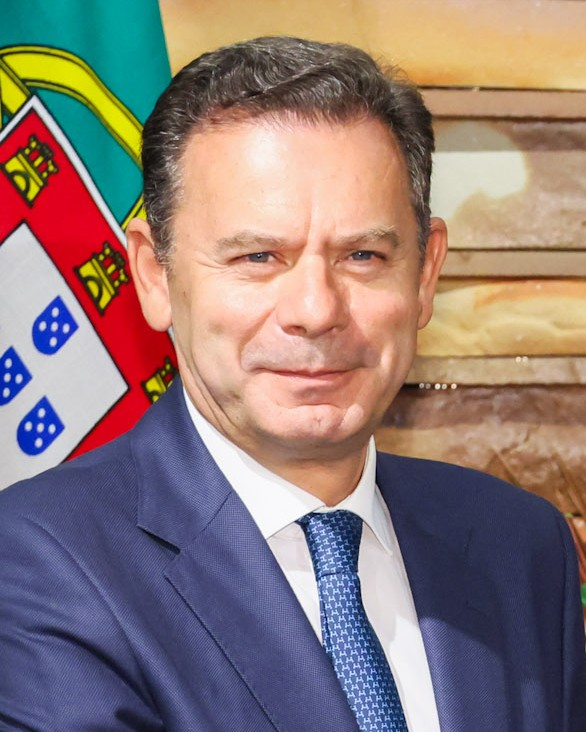
Luís Montenegro
Prime Minister

Portugal has been a semi-presidential representative democratic republic since the ratification of the Constitution of 1976. The Constitution divides the core structures of the Portuguese political system among four sovereignty organs: the president, the government, the Assembly of the Republic, and the courts. There is universal suffrage for adults over 18 years of age, with a secret ballot for all elected offices. Portugal operates a competitive multi-party system at the national, regional, and local levels. There have been trends towards autocratisation.

The head of state of Portugal is the president who is elected to a five-year term by direct, universal adult suffrage. The president is usually regarded as politically independent and carries moderating powers aimed at ensuring the regular functioning of institutions and constitutional guarantees; (Note: The president also holds exceptional powers besides the moderating powers, which are not exclusive to the office.) in addition, it includes supreme command of the armed forces, and shapes political opinions and agendas. The current president of Portugal is António José Seguro; he took office after winning the runoff vote of the 2026 Portuguese presidential election.

The Belém Palace, residence and workplace of the president

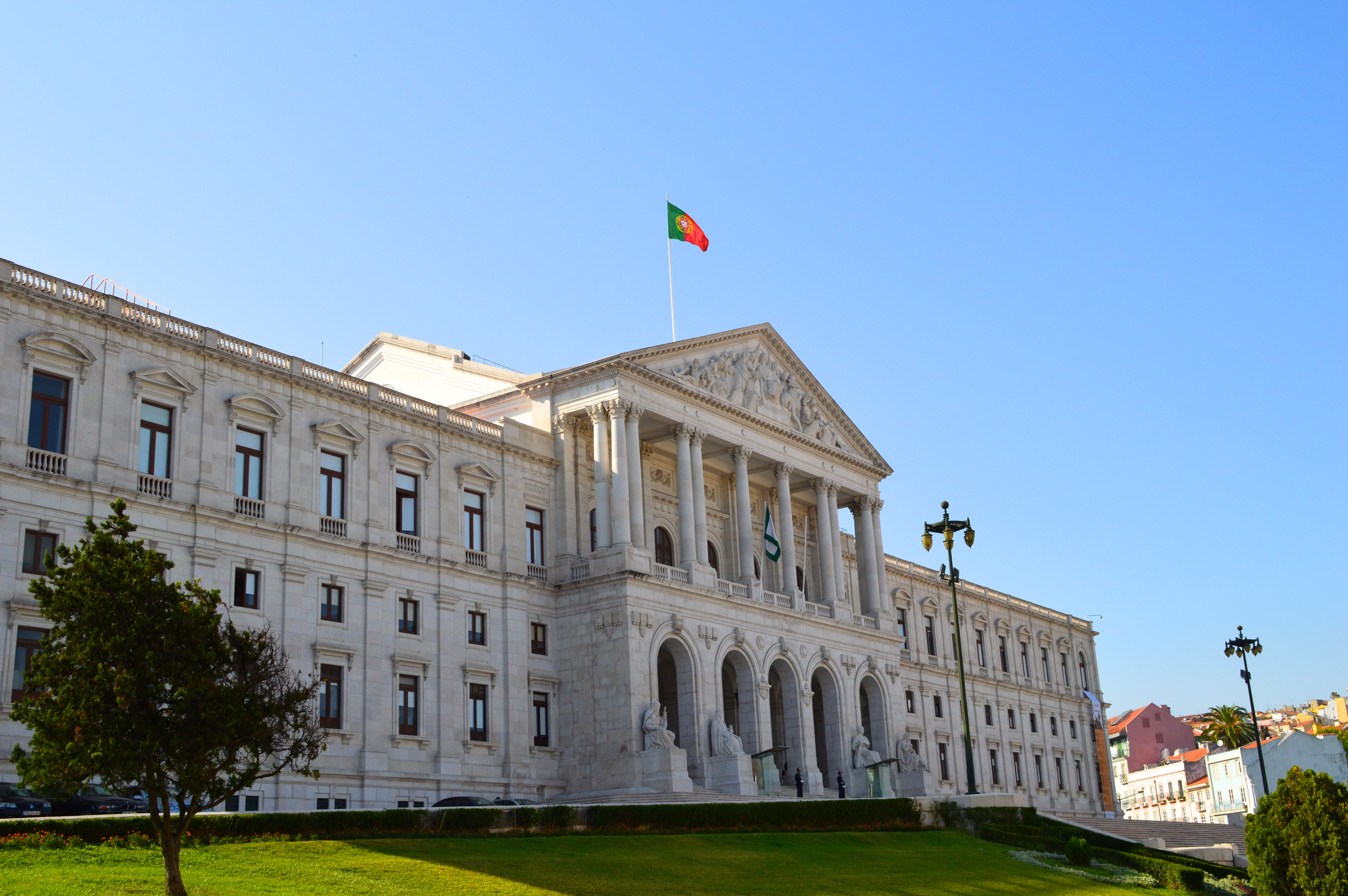
The São Bento Palace, seat of the Assembly of the Republic

Portugal's legislative body is the Assembly of the Republic, a unicameral parliament. It consists of a single chamber with a minimum of 180 seats and a maximum of 230, elected by popular vote every four years or when dissolved. The members of parliament represent the whole country and not the constituencies for which they are elected. The Assembly of the Republic is dominated by three political parties, the Social Democratic Party (PSD), Chega (CH), and the Socialist Party (PS).

As the head of government, the prime minister directs government policy, leads the Council of Ministers which includes ministers and junior ministers that execute government policy, (Note: Each minister and the prime minister is supported by a cabinet office of, on average, 45 staff, with the prime minister's exceeding that figure. These offices exercise broad roles in policymaking, coordination, and brokerage.) and is appointed by the president in light of electoral results after consulting with the parties with parliament seats. Portugal's current prime minister is Luís Montenegro, who took office after the AD – PSD/CDS Coalition won enough seats to form a minority government following the 2024 Portuguese legislative election.

Portugal has a civil law system based on Roman law and on Canon Law and influenced by German civil law. The Constitution is the supreme law of Portugal. In the Portuguese legal system, private civil law and criminal law are codified in the Código Civil and the Código Penal respectively. Portugal's court system is organised into judicial, administrative, and fiscal branches with three levels of jurisdiction and separate courts of last appeal, while the Constitutional Court is responsible for constitutional review and oversight of elections, referendums and political parties.

=== Administrative divisions ===
Portugal is a highly centralised unitary state comprising two autonomous regions, as well as seven regions on the mainland. Subnational government in Portugal is currently organised through municipalities (concelhos), civil parishes (freguesias), and intermunicipal communities (comunidades intermunicipais). In the following table, the intermunicipal communities are grouped by region:

framless

North

1. Alto Minho
2. Cávado
3. Porto Metropolitan Area
4. Ave
5. Tâmega e Sousa
6. Alto Tâmega e Barroso
7. Douro

8. Terras de Trás-os-Montes

Centre

9. Aveiro
10. Viseu Dão Lafões
11. Beiras e Serra da Estrela
12. Coimbra
13. Leiria

14. Beira Baixa

Oeste e Vale do Tejo

15. Oeste
16. Médio Tejo

17. Lezíria do Tejo

Greater Lisbon

18. Greater Lisbon
Setúbal Peninsula

19. Setúbal Peninsula
Alentejo

20. Alto Alentejo
21. Alentejo Central
22. Alentejo Litoral

23. Baixo Alentejo

Algarve

24. Algarve
Autonomous regions

25. Madeira
26. Azores

=== Foreign relations ===
Diplomatic missions of Portugal Countries that host a Portuguese Embassy or Consulate Countries that do not host Portuguese diplomatic missions Portugal

A member state of the United Nations since 1955, Portugal is a member of almost all major international organisations, and is among the countries that founded NATO in 1949, the OECD in 1961, EFTA in 1960, and the Community of Portuguese Language Countries (CPLP) in 1996, an international organisation of countries with Portuguese as an official language.

Portugal has a stable foreign policy that is the result of its history, geography, and specific foreign policy choices. It is structured around six principal regional and policy priorities: Europe, NATO and relations with the United Kingdom and with the United States, the Portuguese-speaking world, the importance of and support for Portuguese communities abroad, the internationalisation of the national economy, and the strengthening of multilateralism. Portugal regards the success of European integration as paramount and is prepared, where a consensus exists among European Union member states, to endorse policies that go against with the country's national interests; it also supports general disarmament, the dismantling of political-military blocs, and the creation of a collective security system aimed at establishing an international order grounded in peace and justice among peoples.

Portugal has two territorial disputes, both of which are with Spain: the Spanish town of Olivenza which has been claimed by Portugal since the 19th century, and the surrounding waters of the Portuguese Savage Islands which have been claimed by Spain since the 15th century. Despite causing moments of tension between the two countries, the relationship between the two countries remains excellent.

=== Military ===
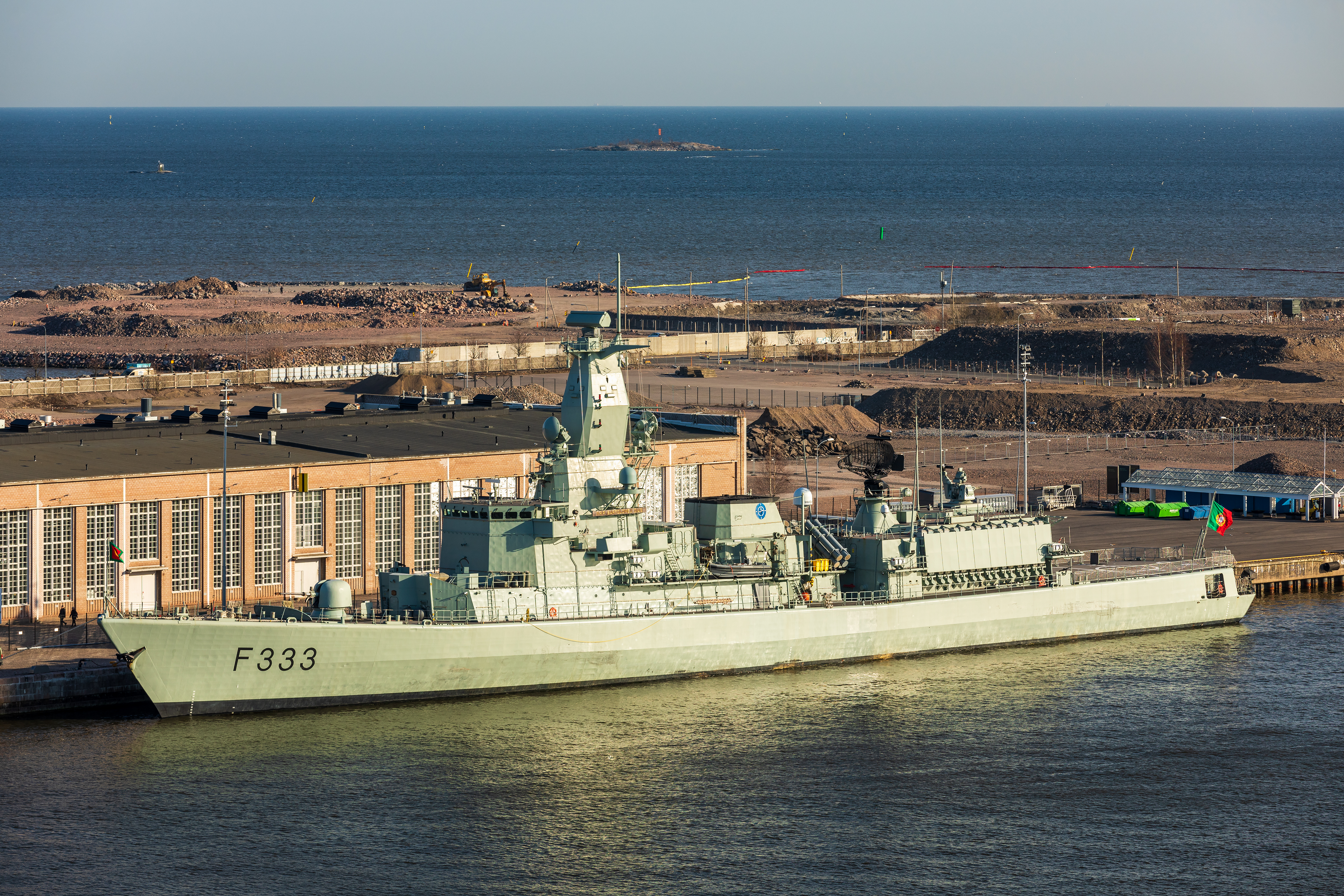
Portuguese Navy frigate NRP Bartolomeu Dias

The Portuguese Armed Forces consist of three branches commanded by the Estado-Maior-General das Forças Armadas (Armed Forces General Staff): the Marinha (Navy), Exército (Army), and Força Aérea (Air Force). In addition to the three branches of the armed forces, there is the Guarda Nacional Republicana (National Republican Guard), a gendarmerie, comprising 23,042 personnel in 2025, under the authority of both the Defence and the Home Affairs ministries. The Portuguese military serves as a self-defence force, takes part in humanitarian and peace missions undertaken by the international organisations to which Portugal belongs, and cooperates in civil defence missions. In recent years, the Portuguese military have carried out several NATO and European Union missions worldwide. The Portuguese military budget in 2026 was estimated at more than US$7 billion, representing 2.1% of GDP.

As of 2025, the three branches numbered 23,589 military personnel. Prior to 1999, military service was compulsory for men at age 18. This obligation was suspended in 1999 and was replaced by a mandatory day of education about the Armed Forces called Dia da Defesa Nacional (National Defence Day). Since 1992 women may serve in all branches of the armed forces.

=== Law enforcement ===
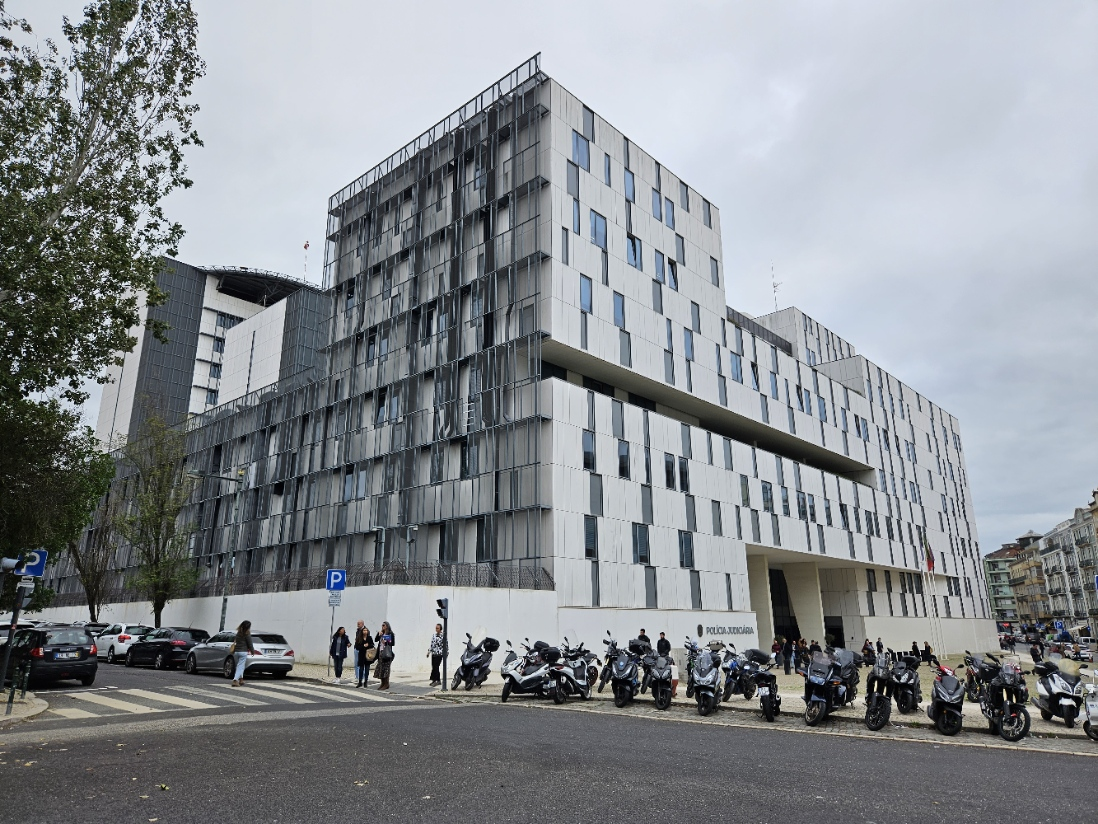
The headquarters of the Polícia Judiciária (Judiciary Police), in Lisbon

In Portugal, public prosecution is conducted by the Public Prosecution Service which is headed by the prosecutor general. The main police organisations of Portugal are the Guarda Nacional Republicana (National Republican Guard), the Polícia de Segurança Pública (Public Security Police), a civilian police force that works in urban areas; and the Polícia Judiciária (Judiciary Police), a senior criminal police body, under the authority of the Minister of Justice and endowed with administrative autonomy.

Portugal has 49 correctional facilities run by the Directorate-General for Reintegration and Prison Services (DGRSP). The facilities are classified by security level, and by degree of management complexity, and often house inmates with different legal statuses, risk levels, and criminal trajectories within the same facilities. Despite following a reintegration-oriented penal model, Portugal retains high prison occupancy and an average sentence length of 31.3 months and one of the world's highest prison suicide rates representing around 30% of the 60 to 70 deaths occurring annually.

=== Human rights ===
Portugal has a tradition of a humanistic criminal justice. The Portuguese Constitution defines the country as being one that is based on human dignity. It abolished capital punishment and life imprisonment in the 19th century, and forbids extradition in the case of either sentence possibly being imposed. The Portuguese Penal Code provides for a wide range of non-custodial sentences, with the aim of keeping a prison sentence a punishment of last resort. Portuguese penitentiary laws have traditionally been progressive, and based on rehabilitation as the main goal of the implementation of such a sentence.

Since the 1980s, Portugal has strengthened LGBTQ rights and become one of Europe's most equal countries, although historical isolation and authoritarianism continues to shape social acceptance of LGBTQ people. In 2001, Portugal decriminalised the personal possession and consumption of all drugs. Portugal faces issues such as unwarranted use of force by law enforcement, racism and discrimination against minorities, migrant slavery, restrictions on freedom of association and collective bargaining, violations of wage, hour, and overtime laws, and persistent structural and institutional deficiencies in the prison system. (Note: Such as constrained resources, inadequate conditions, insufficient transparency, and the risk of non-compliance with international human rights standards.)

== Economy ==
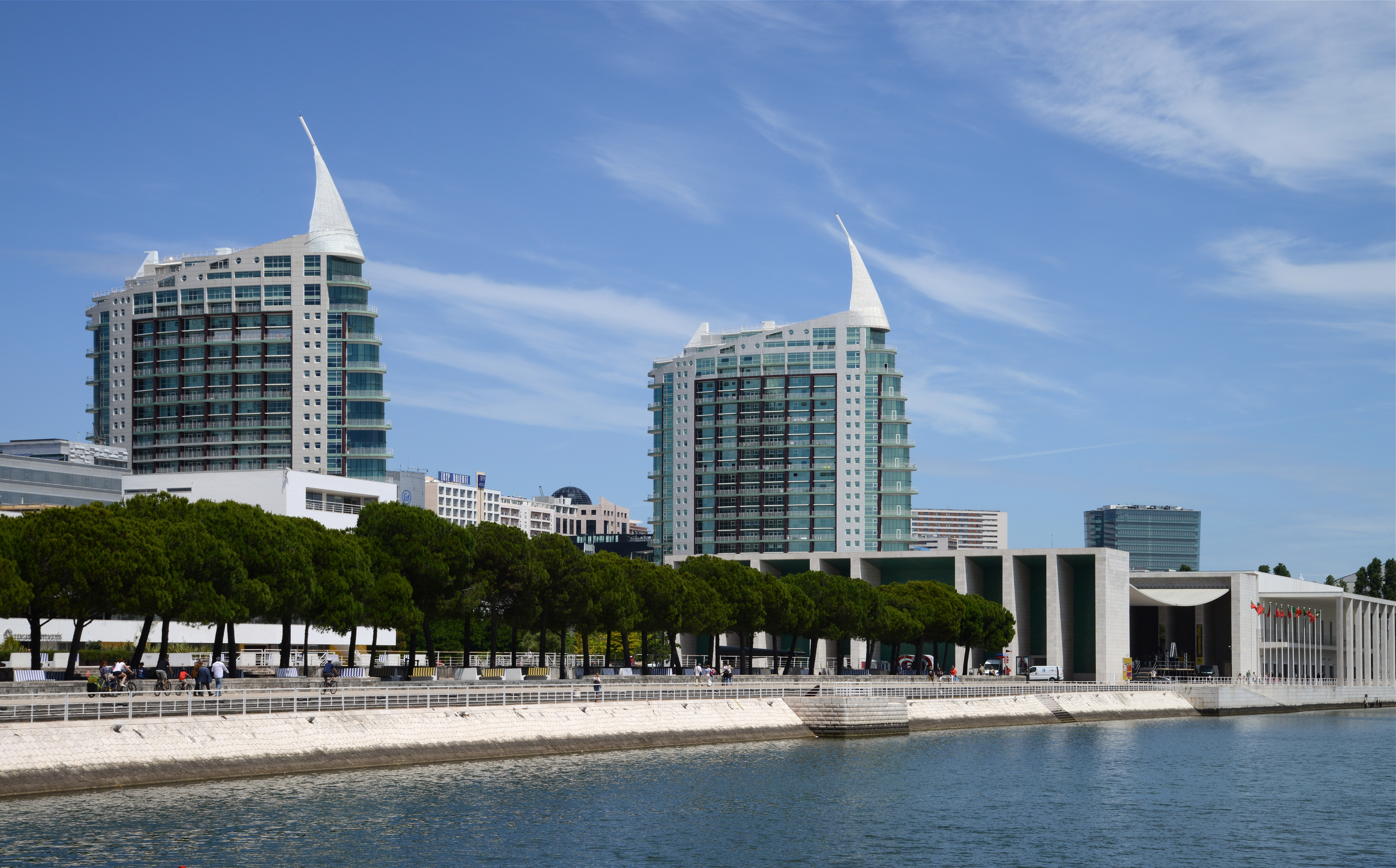
Parque das Nações, in Lisbon; an economic centre in Portugal

Portugal is a high-income country with an advanced economy that follows the Mediterranean model. The country's economic policy is framed by strategic guidelines called Major Options, which are subsequently implemented through the State Budget. Portugal has the EU's 14th-largest economy by nominal GDP and the 12th-largest economy by PPP-adjusted GDP. Its PPP-adjusted GDP per capita stood at to 81% of the EU average in 2025. As of 2024, Portugal's service sector contributed the most for its economic output followed the industrial sector and its primary sector. In 2025, Portugal unemployment rate was 5.8%. As of 2024, its poverty rate after social transfers was 15.4% of the population while in 2023, the at-risk-of-poverty rate before social transfers stood at 40.3%. The national debt of Portugal was estimated at 89.2% relative to GDP as of 2025.

Portugal is part of the European single market which represents more than 450 million consumers. Portugal replaced the escudo with the euro in 2002. Its monetary policy is set by the European Central Bank. The country has been a part of the Eurozone since its inception. Portugal's central bank is the Banco de Portugal and it is part of the European System of Central Banks. In 2025, Portugal had a combined share of trade openness, exports and imports combined, that amounted to 86% of its total GDP.

In February 2026, Portugal's main export markets were Spain at 26% and Germany at 13.9%. Its main exports are machinery and mechanical appliances, vehicles and other transportation equipment, base metals, and plastics. Portugal's main import markets in 2026 were Spain at 32.9% and Germany at 11.9%. Portugal's main imports are machinery and mechanical appliances, chemical products, agricultural products, and mineral fuels.

Since the 1990s, Portugal's economic model has been based on public consumption and economic development focused on exports, private investment and the development of its high-tech sector. Consequently, business services have overtaken more traditional industries such as wine and cork in export earnings. Operated by the Euronext Lisbon, Portugal's stock market, the PSI, includes 16 major companies based on the country, including Sonae, Mota-Engil, Corticeira Amorim, The Navigator Company, and EDP.

In 2025, Portugal ranked 16th among European Union member states in innovation by the European Innovation Scoreboard, while placing 31st worldwide in the Global Innovation Index. In 2024, neuroscience accounted for 12.5% of Portugal's scientific output, the second-highest national share, and the country ranked 23rd worldwide in total neuroscience output. Among the research institutions based in the country are the Gulbenkian Institute of Molecular Medicine, the International Iberian Nanotechnology Laboratory, and the Champalimaud Foundation which was one of the world's top non-profit institution in neuroscience research between 2019 and 2023.

=== Agriculture and fishery ===
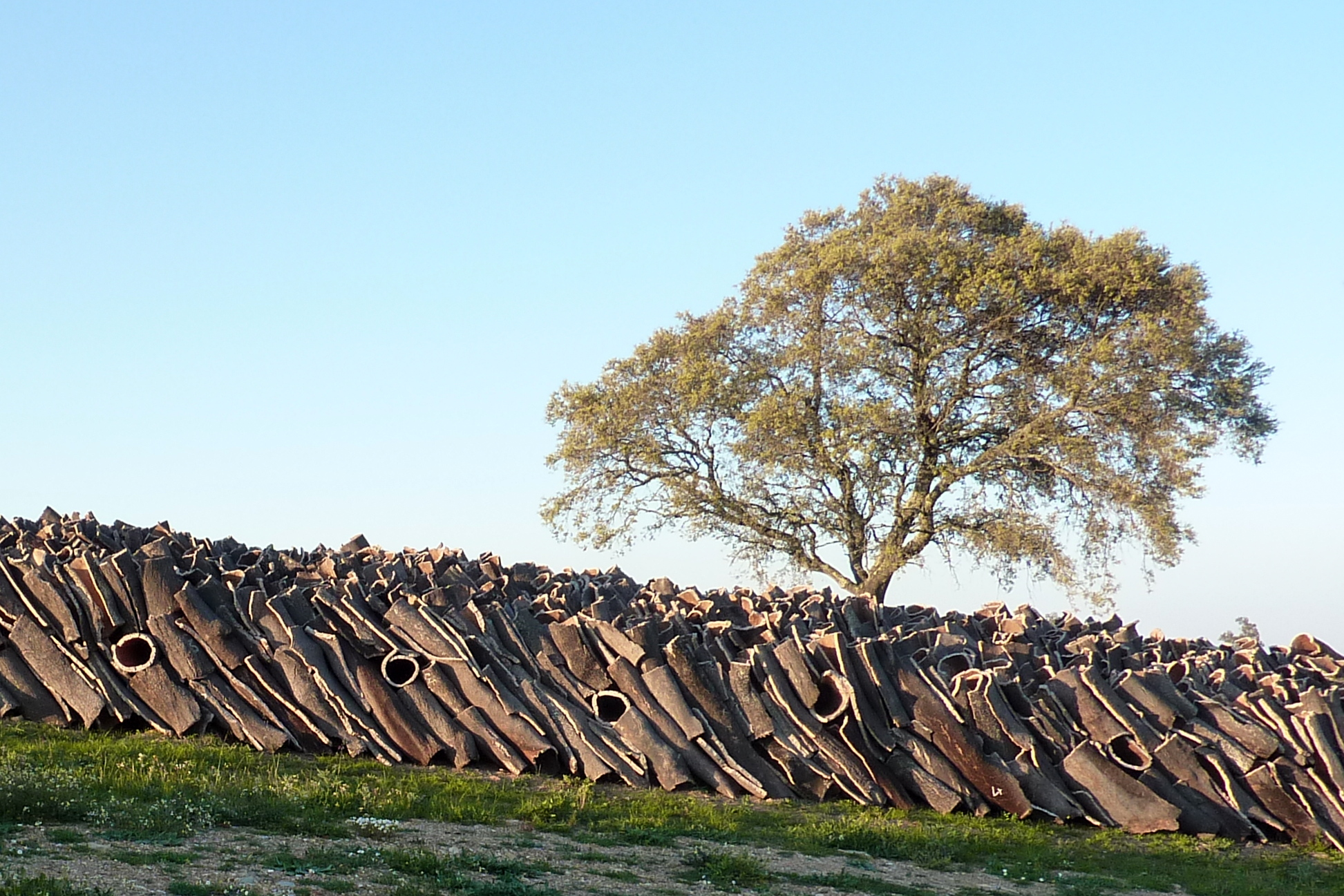
The harvesting of cork bark. The majority of the world's cork is produced in Portugal.

The Portuguese agriculture sector accounted for 2.9% of the country's total GDP as of 2024. Portugal's agricultural land encompassed an area of approximately 3,697,000 ha (36,970 km^{2}) as of 2023, of which 17.4% was dedicated to organic farming, representing the fifth-highest share worldwide. Despite the extent of the country's agricultural land, the diversity of Portugal's agroecological conditions enables the cultivation of various agricultural products such as wheat, maize, and rice, with each one having an important role in the primary sector, and resulting in an agricultural self-sufficiency rate of 85% as of 2018.

Portugal ranks sixth in the world in seafood consumption per capita, with each Portuguese person consuming on average 54 kg (119 lb) of fish in 2023. The high fish consumption in Portugal is due to tradition and cultural roots, politics, dynamics of the fish market system, and geography. Strong demand for seafood makes the fisheries a valuable national asset. While Portugal captured 185,000 tonnes (182,000 long tons; 204,000 short tons) of fish in 2019, down from the 222,000 t (218,000 long tons; 245,000 short tons) in 2010, fish and seafood represent the single highest import of biocapacity from abroad, amounting to 1,600,000 global hectares in total.

=== Industry and services ===
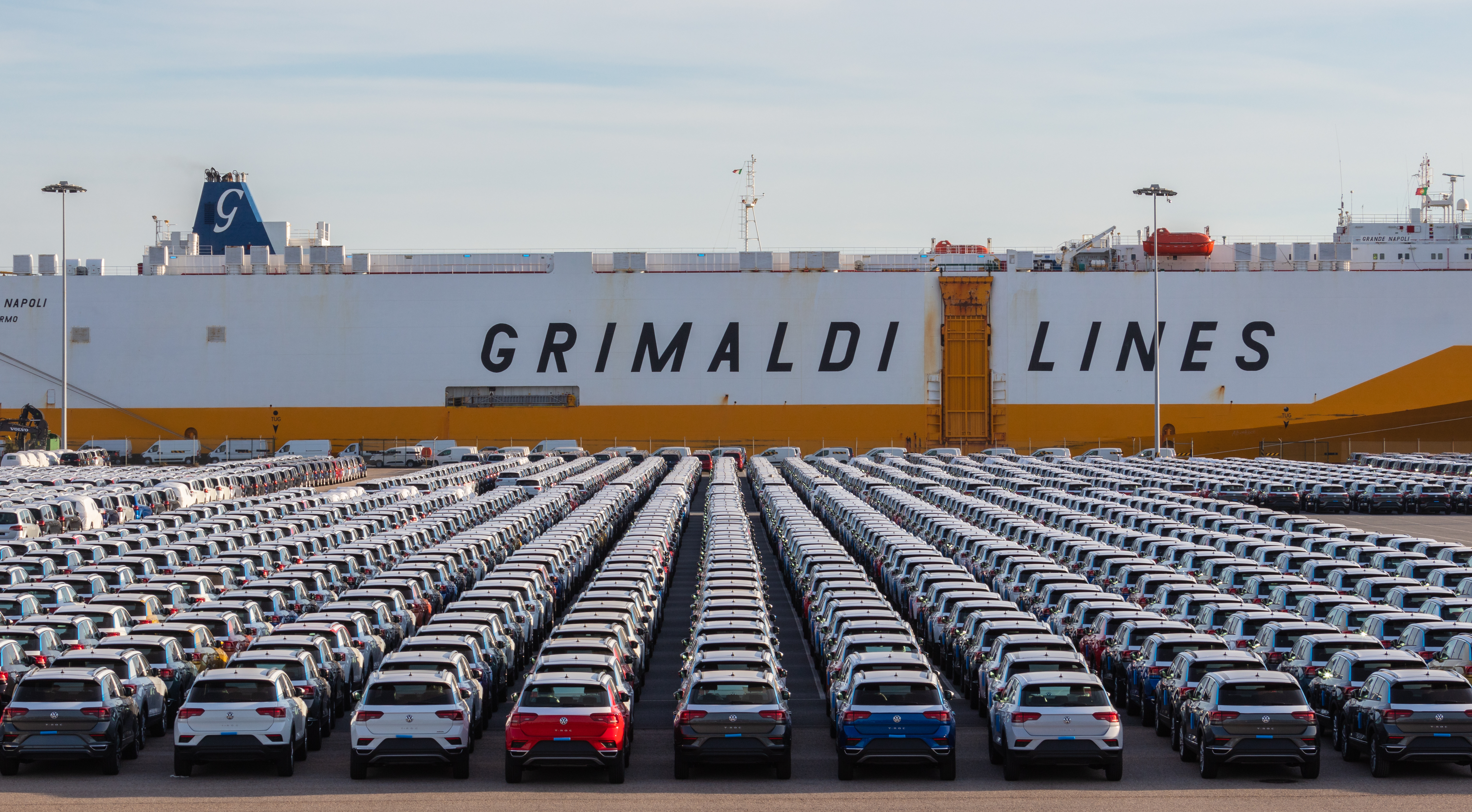
Volkswagen Autoeuropa cars in the Port of Setúbal

Portugal's manufacturing industry accounted for 21.2% of the country's total GDP as of 2024, down from an annual average of 26% over the period between 1953 and 1973. The lower contribution of manufacturing to Portugal's economy has led to lower real GDP growth rates between 1974 and 2019 than during the period between 1950 and 1973. As of 2025, Portugal's automobile industry produced the biggest share of the country's exports. The automobile industry accounts for 20.2% of the country manufacturing exports and 82.8% of the total value of its exports employing 43.247 workers in 2020.

Portugal's service sector accounted for 76.5% of the country's total economic output as of 2024. Tourism, retail, and telecommunication are all major industries. Tourism represented 11.8% of the Portugal's total GDP as of 2025. Portugal attracted nearly 30 million international tourists in 2025, ranking 15th in the world in that year for inbound tourism.

=== Infrastructure ===
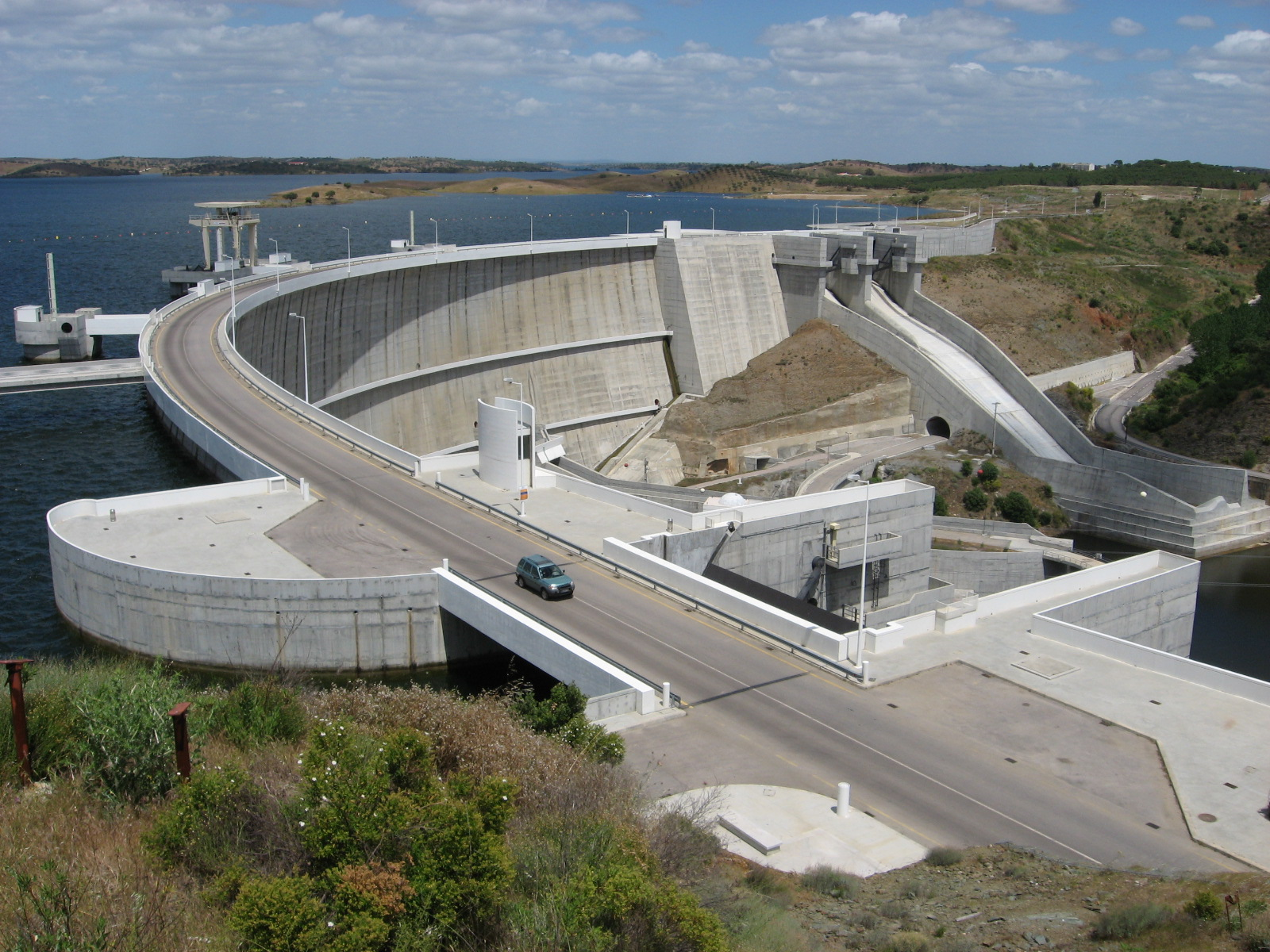
The Alqueva Dam is one of the largest strategic water reserves in Europe.

Portugal's road network includes a system of 48 motorways, which, as of 2023, ranked as the seventh largest among 42 European countries. The busiest Portuguese airports are Lisbon Airport, Porto Airport, Faro Airport, Madeira Airport, and Ponta Delgada Airport. As of 2024, passenger and freight rail transport in Portugal operated on 2,526 km (1,570 mi) of active railway lines, with passenger services operated mainly by Comboios de Portugal (CP). The Port of Sines serves as Portugal's foremost container port and leads the country in cargo tonnage.

As of 2023, two-thirds of Portugal's energy supply was imported, representing the 11th-highest level of energy dependency in the European Union. The country is pursuing energy transition and has invested in the development of renewable energy sources, such as hydro, wave, solar and wind power. Portugal has expanded the role of renewable sources in its energy sector, with renewables accounting for 35.2% of energy consumption, as of 2023 up from 21.9% in 2007, and 78.1% of total installed capacity, compared with 59.3% in 2014. In 2021, the country completed the phase-out of coal-fired generation.

== Demographics ==
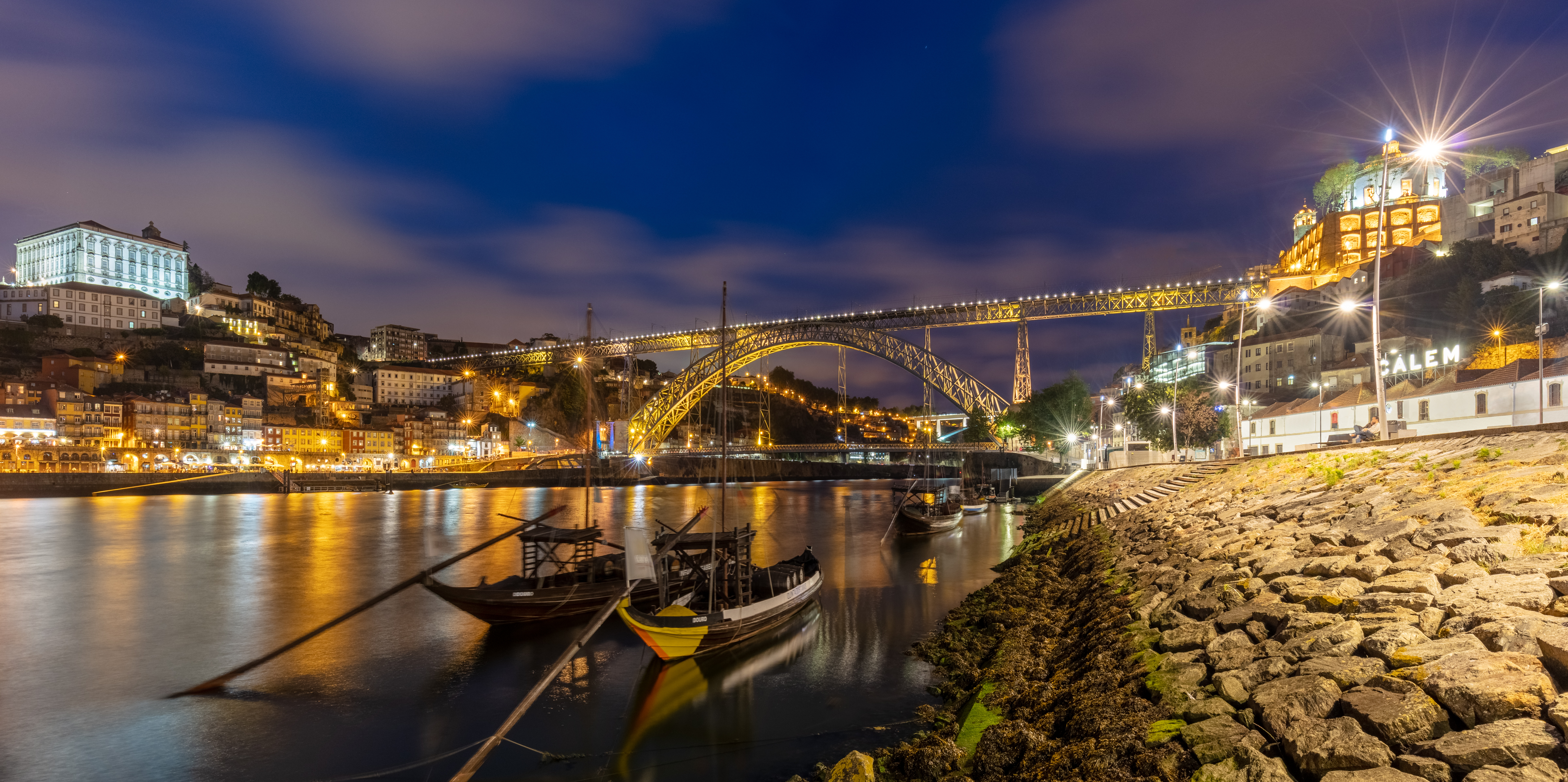
Porto is the second largest city in Portugal, with its metropolitan area the country's second-largest.

In 2025, Portugal had a population of 11,424,031, of whom 9,826,492 were Portuguese nationals. The remainder were foreign residents at 1,597,539. Portugal is steadily ageing and has one of the world's highest proportion of elderly citizens, comprising nearly one-fourth of its entire population, together with a female share of the population at 51.1%.

In 2025, Portugal had a fertility rate of 1.4, which is below the replacement rate of 2.1 and is one of the world's lowest. Portugal has had a fertility rate below the replacement rate of 2.1 since the 1980s that has led to the country having a median age of 45.8, one of the highest in the world. As of 2025, 23.3% of the population was aged 65 or older. Despite the effects of net migration, due to low fertility rates, Portugal's population is projected to drop to 8.3 million by 2100.

Historically a country of emigration, Portugal has been a net recipient of immigrants since 1993 except between 2011 and 2016 during the Portuguese financial crisis. Since 2016, Portugal has experienced a marked increase in immigration, with the proportion of non-nationals in the total population rising from 3.5% to 14.0% by 2025, living mainly in the Algarve and the Lisbon metropolitan area, and with 24.5% of all births registered in 2024 being to foreign-born women. In Portugal, White Portuguese constitute the largest racial and ethnic group, representing 84.2% of the population, followed by multiracial Portuguese at 3.4%, Black Portuguese at 2.2%, Asian Portuguese at 0.7%, and the Romani at 0.6%.

In 2023, 88% of the Portuguese population lived in urban areas. The capital city, Lisbon, had a population of 658,236 as of 2025. It is part of Lisbon metropolitan area, the biggest metropolitan area of Portugal with 3.4 million people.

Largest Municipalities in Portugal INE 2025 Estimate
Rank	Name	Region	Pop.	Rank	Name	Region	Pop.
1	Lisbon	Lisbon	658,236	11	Oeiras	Lisbon	188,056
2	Sintra	Lisbon	449,956	12	Odivelas	Lisbon	185,736
3	Vila Nova de Gaia	North	323,202	13	Matosinhos	North	181,930
4	Porto	North	273,476	14	Gondomar	North	170,597
5	Cascais	Lisbon	242,619	15	Guimarães	North	165,554
6	Loures	Lisbon	236,988	16	Coimbra	Central	156,359
7	Braga	North	212,635	17	Vila Franca de Xira	Lisbon	152,007
8	Amadora	Lisbon	205,517	18	Leiria	Central	145,861
9	Almada	Setúbal Peninsula	202,896	19	Vila Nova de Famalicão	North	143,801
10	Seixal	Setúbal Peninsula	198,254	20	Santa Maria da Feira	North	142,676

=== Religion ===
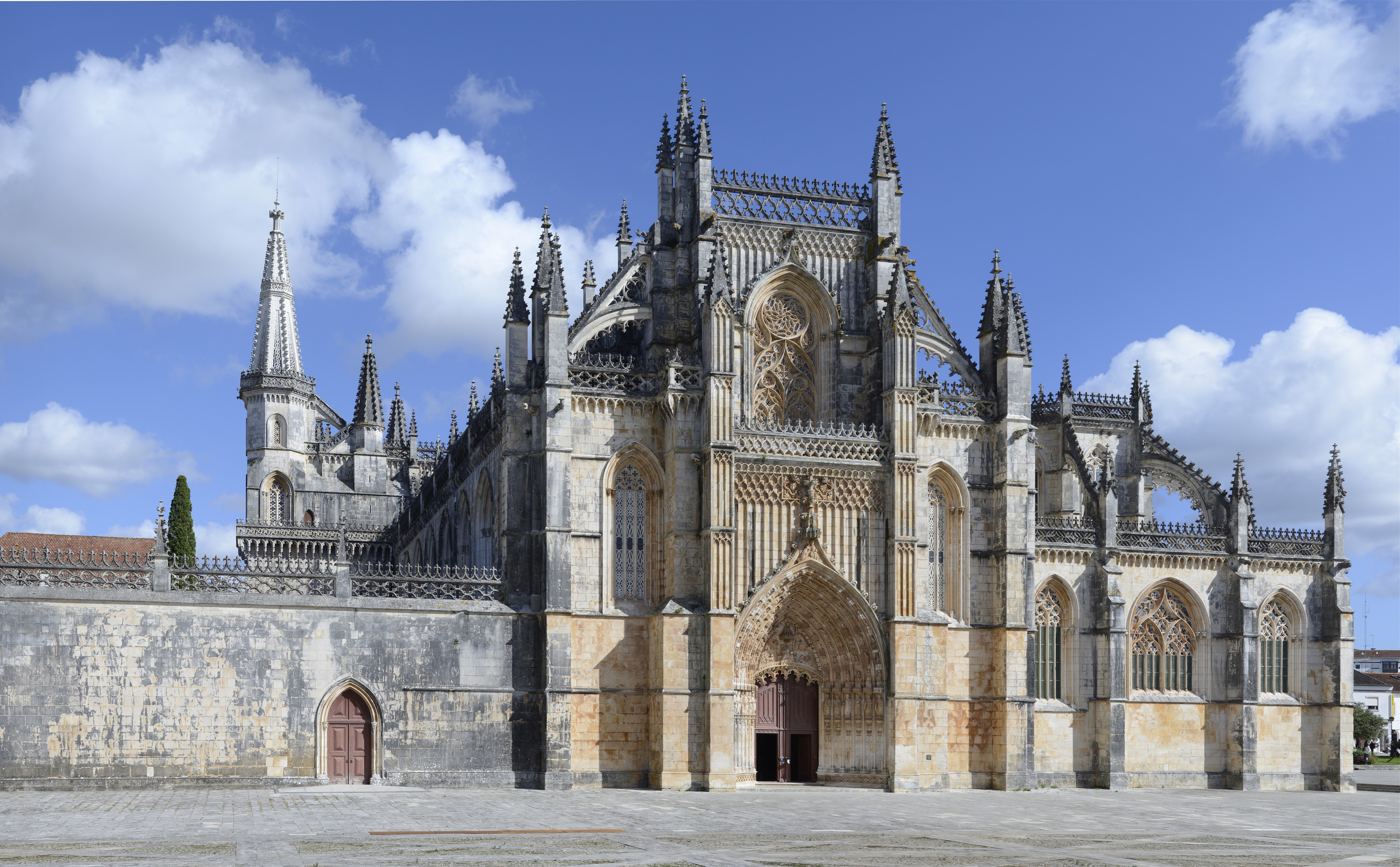
The Batalha Monastery has historically been used to transmit a religious link to Portugal's history.

Portugal has been a secular state since 1911, and it guarantees religious freedom. (Note: The 1976 Constitution guaranteed religious freedom without distinction between denominations and without any specific limits, breaking with earlier regimes of union, secularist neutrality, and preferential relations with the Catholic Church. However, the legal instruments of 1940 were affected in 1975, when it was introduced the dissolubility of Catholic marriage, and remained in force until 2004, when the government and the Holy See agreed a new Concordat.) Although Portugal has no official religion, the Catholic Church has a history there that predates the country's formation and can be traced back to the 3rd century. According to the 2021 Census, 80.2% of the Portuguese population aged 15 and older were Catholic, while 14.1% are nonreligious. (Note: Although Portugal is overwhelmingly Catholic, the majority are non-practicing, a discrepancy that might have existed throughout its religious history.)

The country has small Protestant, Latter-day Saints, Muslim, Hindu, Sikh, Jehovah's Witnesses, Baháʼí, Buddhist, and Jewish communities. Influences from Chinese traditional religion are also evident among many people, particularly in fields related to Traditional Chinese Medicine. (Note: Chinese medical science is well known in Portugal and is widely accepted by the people. Portugal is the first European Union country that specifically provided legislation for acupuncture and Chinese medical science.) Even though Portugal has deep ties with Christianity, as of 2019 the majority of its people were shown to be tolerant towards followers of other faiths, with the Muslim community perceiving itself as thoroughly integrated into Portugal and believing that the country provided conditions conducive to smooth integration.

=== Languages ===
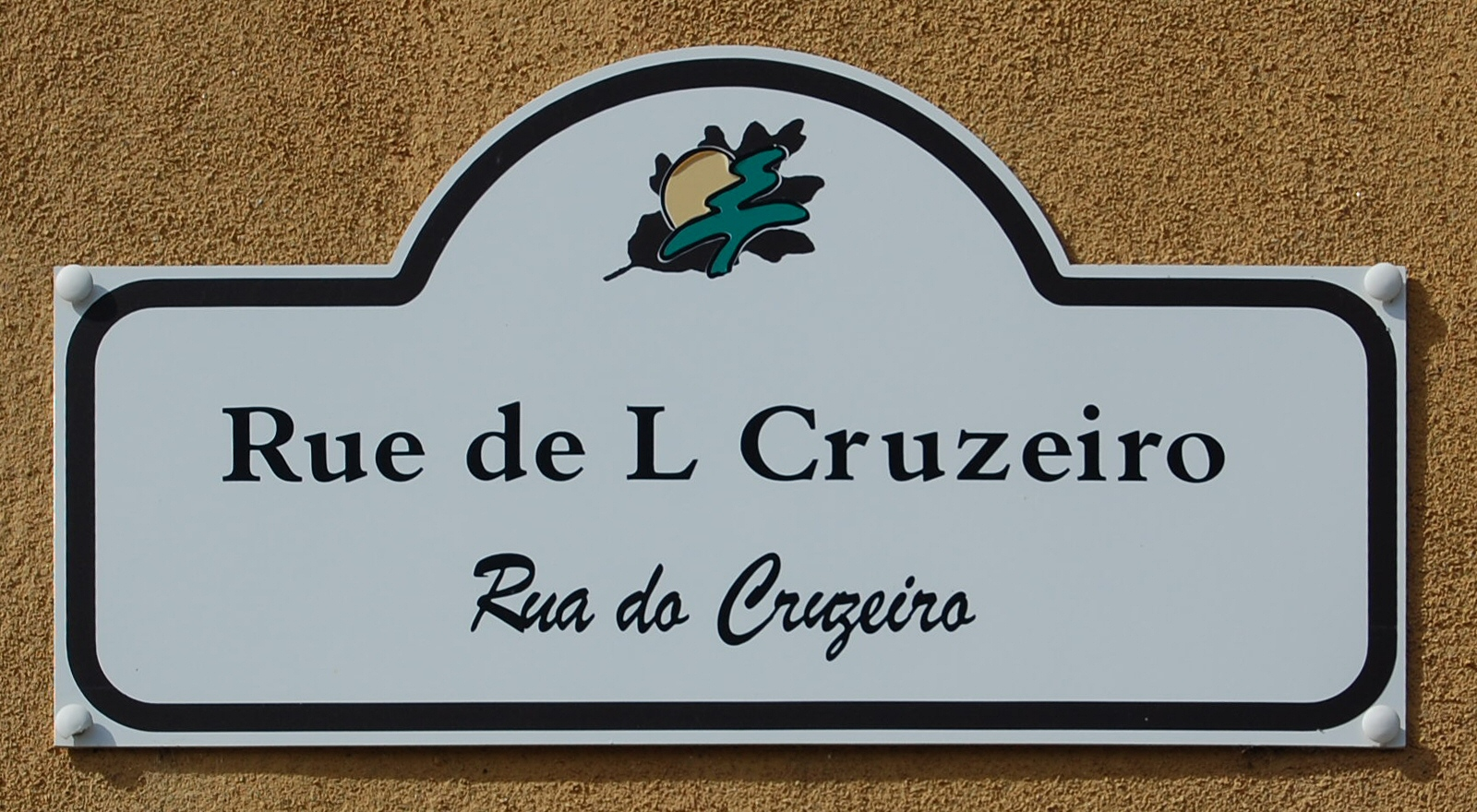
A sign in Mirandese in Miranda do Douro

Portuguese is the official and predominantly spoken language in Portugal. It is one of 24 official and working languages of the European Union. Portuguese is the fifth-most widely spoken first language in the world, with around 250 million native speakers.

Portuguese Sign Language is officially protected by the country's constitution. The recognised regional languages and dialects include Mirandese, spoken in Terra de Miranda, and Barranquenho, in Barrancos. Portuguese people are typically bilingual, with 67.5% speaking at least two languages, and tend to be proficient non-native English speakers, with Portugal placed sixth globally for English proficiency in the 2025 EF English Proficiency Index.

=== Education ===
The University of Coimbra in Coimbra is the first university in Portugal.

Portugal's education system is organised into preschool education; school education, encompassing basic, secondary and higher education; and extracurricular education, which includes continuing education. Optional preschool is provided for all children between three and five years old, after which school attendance is compulsory for 12 years. Basic education lasts nine years and is divided into three cycles, while secondary education is organised into academic and vocational pathways.

Higher education is provided by universities and polytechnic institutions in accordance with the Bologna Process, with the University of Lisbon being the country's largest university by enrolment. A general requirement for higher education are the exames finais nacionais do ensino secundário. Most secondary-school students continue their studies at public higher education institutions or the Military Academy, which also awards university degrees.

Although other European countries began investing in education in the 19th century, Portugal's long-established national identity, stable borders and homogeneous population contributed to a lack of political commitment to educational development until the First Republic in the early 20th century; many of its reforms were subsequently reversed under the Estado Novo, whose deliberate neglect of education contributed to Portugal recording Europe's highest illiteracy rate in 1964; following democratisation in 1974, education became more widely accessible and underwent modernisation.

Portugal lags behind most OECD countries on educational indicators, largely owing to the older working-age generation. Fewer than two-thirds of Portugal's population have completed secondary or higher education. Portugal's adult population aged 16 to 65 records the fifth-lowest level of knowledge and skills in the OECD, whereas school students perform at average levels. In 2021, the national illiteracy rate among people aged 10 or over stood at 3.1%, ranging from 1.4% to 12.3% across the country's municipalities. Portugal spent 4.5% of its total GDP on education in 2022.

=== Health ===
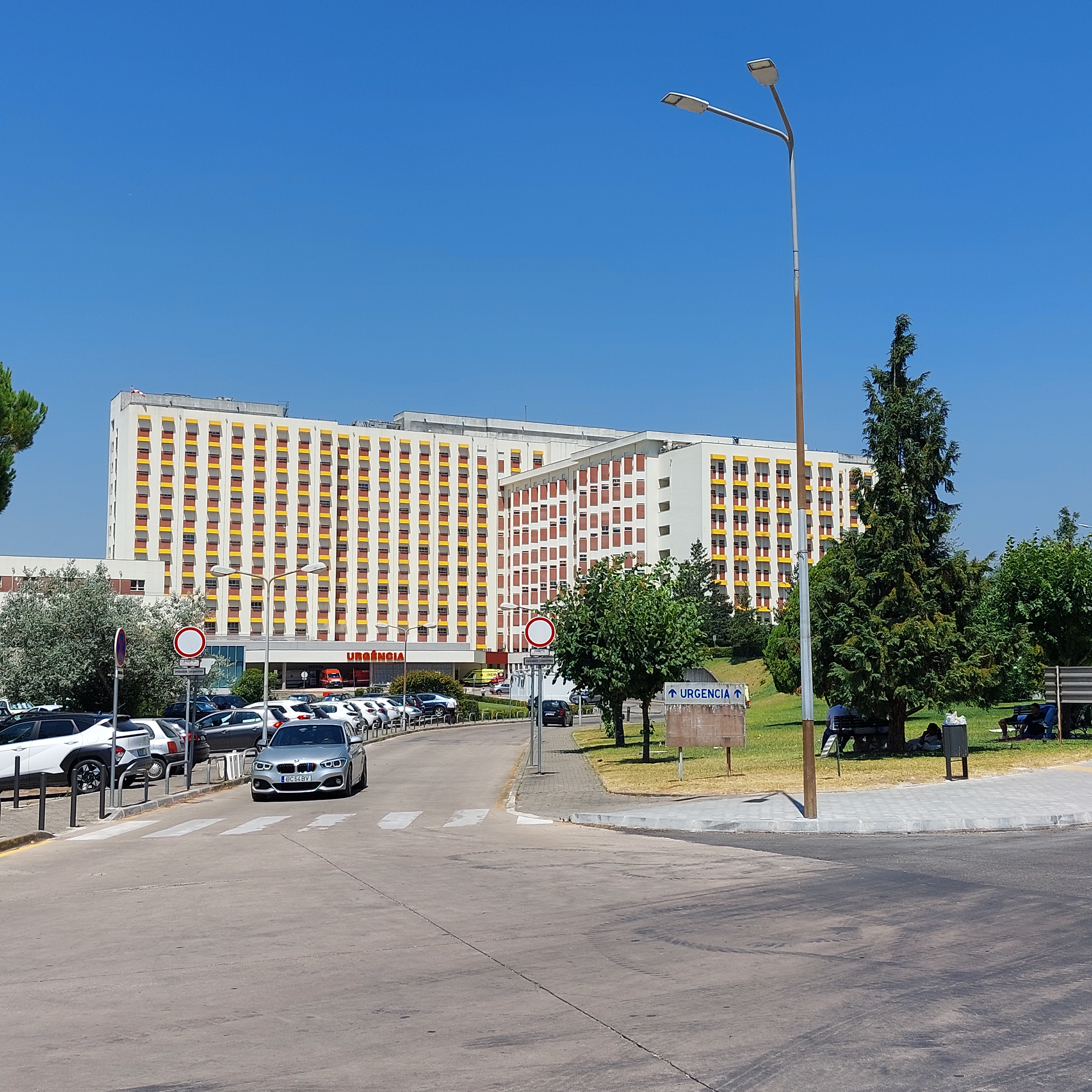
The Centro Hospitalar e Universitário de Coimbra in Coimbra is the largest medical complex in Portugal.

Portugal has a predominantly universal tax-funded health care system, called Serviço Nacional de Saúde (SNS), that operates alongside public-sector health insurance schemes called health subsystems funded mainly through employee and employer contributions, as well as private voluntary health insurance. Primary and hospital care are provided by both public and private entities, with the private sector and complementing services offered by the SNS. In 2023, Portugal had the 3rd lowest public share on health spending in the European Union and over half of public hospitals in technical insolvency in 2020. Portugal has a high level of health inequity in the OECD, driven by limited public spending, uneven distribution of services, low household income, long waiting times, and policy shortcomings.

Portugal ranked 23rd in the world in 2024 in life expectancy with 85.4 years for women and 79.8 years for men, and it had an infant mortality rate of 2.7 deaths per 1,000 live births. In 2022, the leading cause of death were cardiovascular diseases, at 25.4%. Portugal presents several adverse public-health indicators, including the 3rd lowest share of people reporting good health in the European Union, in 2024, at 54%, the highest alcohol consumption with 11.9 litres (2.6 imp gal; 3.1 US gal) consumed per person, in 2020, and the highest share of adult population living a sedentary lifestyle, in 2022, at 73%, a pattern reinforced by limited active-transport infrastructure and unsafe conditions for pedestrians and cyclists. The percentage of the Portuguese population suffering from moderate or severe food insecurity between 2023 and 2025 was on average 11%, which makes Portugal the second-highest country in Southern Europe for this indicator where the average stands at 5.8%. Stakeholders have raised concerns over the effectiveness of food safety policies.

== Culture ==
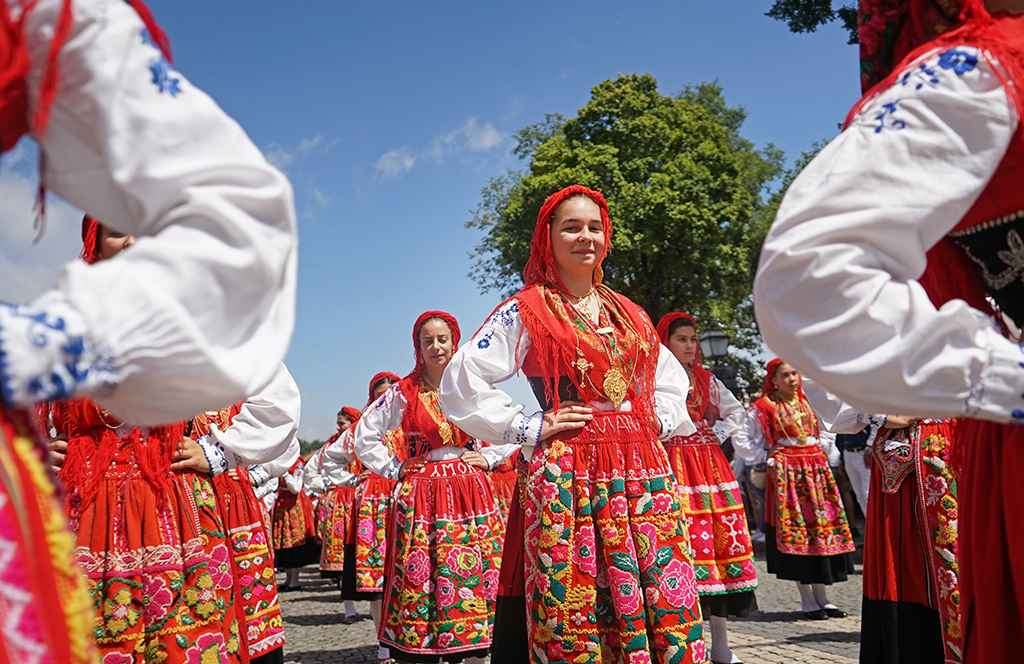
The women of the North Region practice the traditional art of gold-thread embroidery, as seen in this photo of Romaria de Nossa Senhora da Agonia in Viana do Castelo.

Portugal's culture has developed due to the influence from various civilisations that have crossed Europe, especially the Mediterranean. Later, during the period of Portugal's engagement in the Age of Discovery, cultural elements from outside of Europe were introduced and became a central element of Portuguese national identity.

Portugal is known for its heritage and architecture, sacred sites, festivities, poetry, its music (especially the fado), and cuisine (including its wine). As of 2026, UNESCO inscribed 17 properties in Portugal on the World Heritage List. Portugal's national day is on 10 June, celebrated as the Dia de Portugal, de Camões e das Comunidades Portuguesas (Portugal, Camões, and Portuguese Communities Day).

=== Art and architecture ===
The Saint Vincent Panels (c. 1470) by Nuno Gonçalves are one of the most significant works of Portuguese painting from the 15th century.

The history of visual art in Portugal dates back into the Paleolithic. An early evidence showing an attempt at depicting motion was found at the Prehistoric Rock Art Sites in the Côa Valley and Siega Verde. Over time, foreign and native influences, together with advancements in manufacturing, developed distinctive art styles, such as the Manueline and Pombaline, and also a number of crafts that are typical of Portugal, namely the azulejo, talha dourada, and Portuguese pavement.

Historically, Christianity played an influential role in Portuguese art and was a recurrent theme in many art forms, including painting. Throughout the country's history, artwork in Portugal was typically done by local artists who, depending on location, followed different variations in style, giving Portugal a diverse array of artistic styles throughout the country, an example of this being the thatch houses of Santana, in Madeira.

=== Literature ===
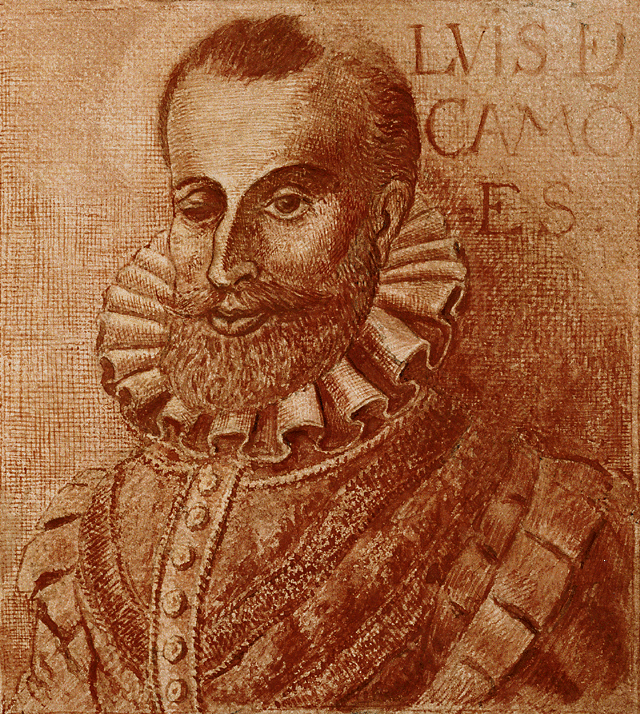
Luís Vaz de Camões was the writer of Os Lusíadas.

Portugal has a literary tradition that predates the Portuguese language going back into the early 13th century. Portuguese literature developed through song as well as the written page known as cantigas. The cantigas drew practitioners from all social ranging from King Denis I to Martin Codax who was a minstrel. The earliest known work of literature produced by a Portuguese is the Ora faz ost'o senhor de Navarra, a cantiga de escárnio e maldizer written in Galician–Portuguese by João Soares de Paiva at around the year 1200.

Portuguese literature developed under the influence of both European geopolitical developments and broader European literary traditions. The Hundred Years' War helped foster the development of Portuguese chronicles by Fernão Lopes, which constitute a valuable record of some of Europe's early encounters with peoples beyond the continent. European medieval chivalric literature, together with didactic religious literature transmitted through adaptations and partial translations, contributed to the development of Portuguese poetry in the translated works of Norman French Arturian narratives. Portuguese literature flourished during the Age of Discovery with writers such as Luís Vaz de Camões and António Ferreira. Modern Portuguese literature took shape through the work of Almeida Garrett, one of the founders of Portuguese Romanticism. Portugal has one Nobel Prize–winning author—José Saramago (1998).

=== Music ===
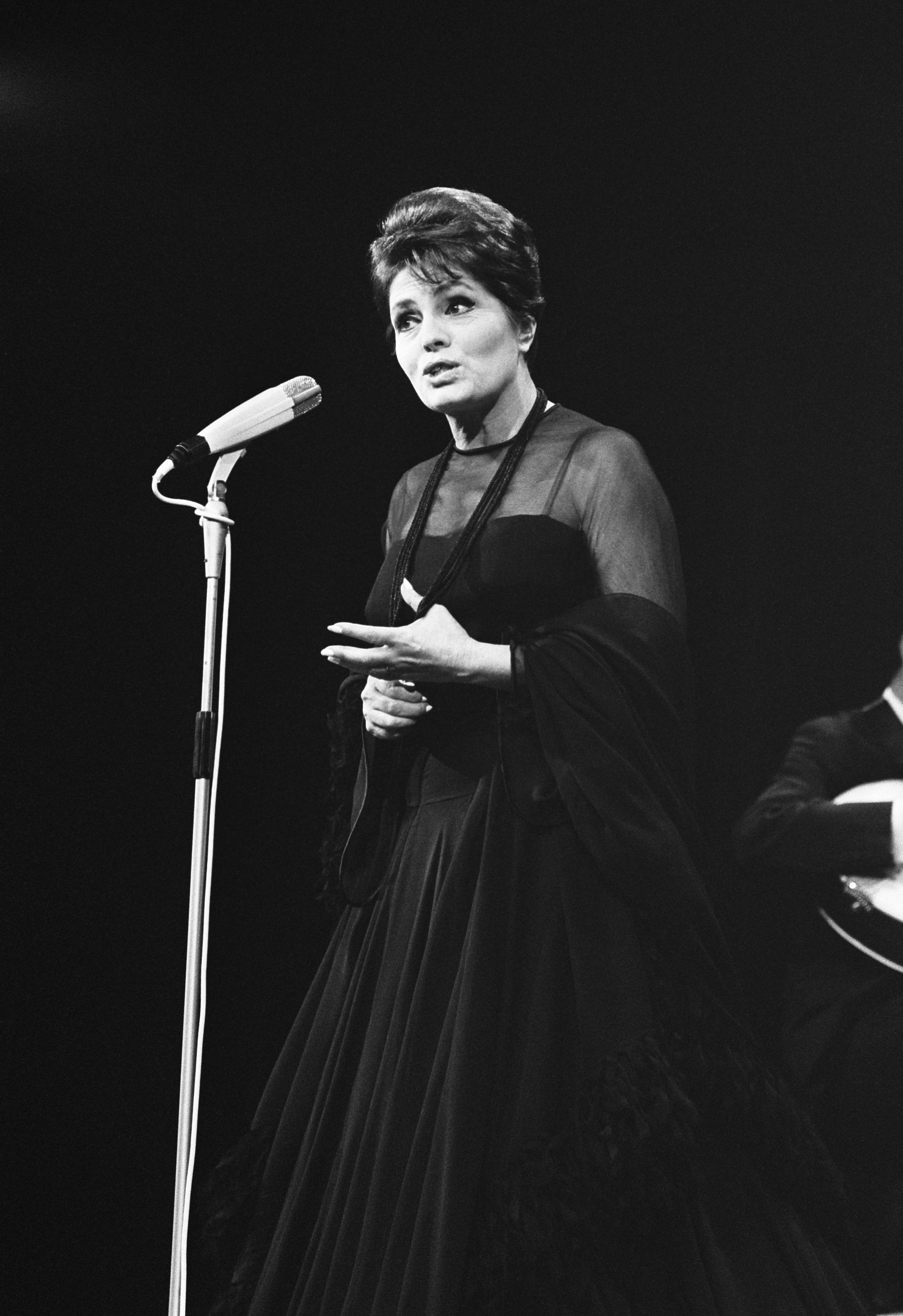
Amália Rodrigues was known as the "Queen of Fado".

The recorded history of music in Portugal dates back to the 6th century. The earliest documentation of a church singer in Portugal is from the year 525 and refers to an individual named André. Portuguese music initially consisted mostly of liturgical music and troubadourism. Over time, new folk traditions together with the influence of foreign cultures and the creation of new instruments, especially guitars, led to a diverse variety of regional folk music such as the fado, the Coimbra fado, and Madeira's folk music.

Popular music in Portugal after the Carnation Revolution has been heavily influenced by American trends, which has led into the evolution of hip-hop tuga and popularisation of rock. Historically, Portugal has been a country of emigration which has heavily influenced the pimba in the 20th century and led to the introduction of Portuguese music into other cultures such as the ukelele in Hawaii in the 19th century.

=== Holidays and festivities ===
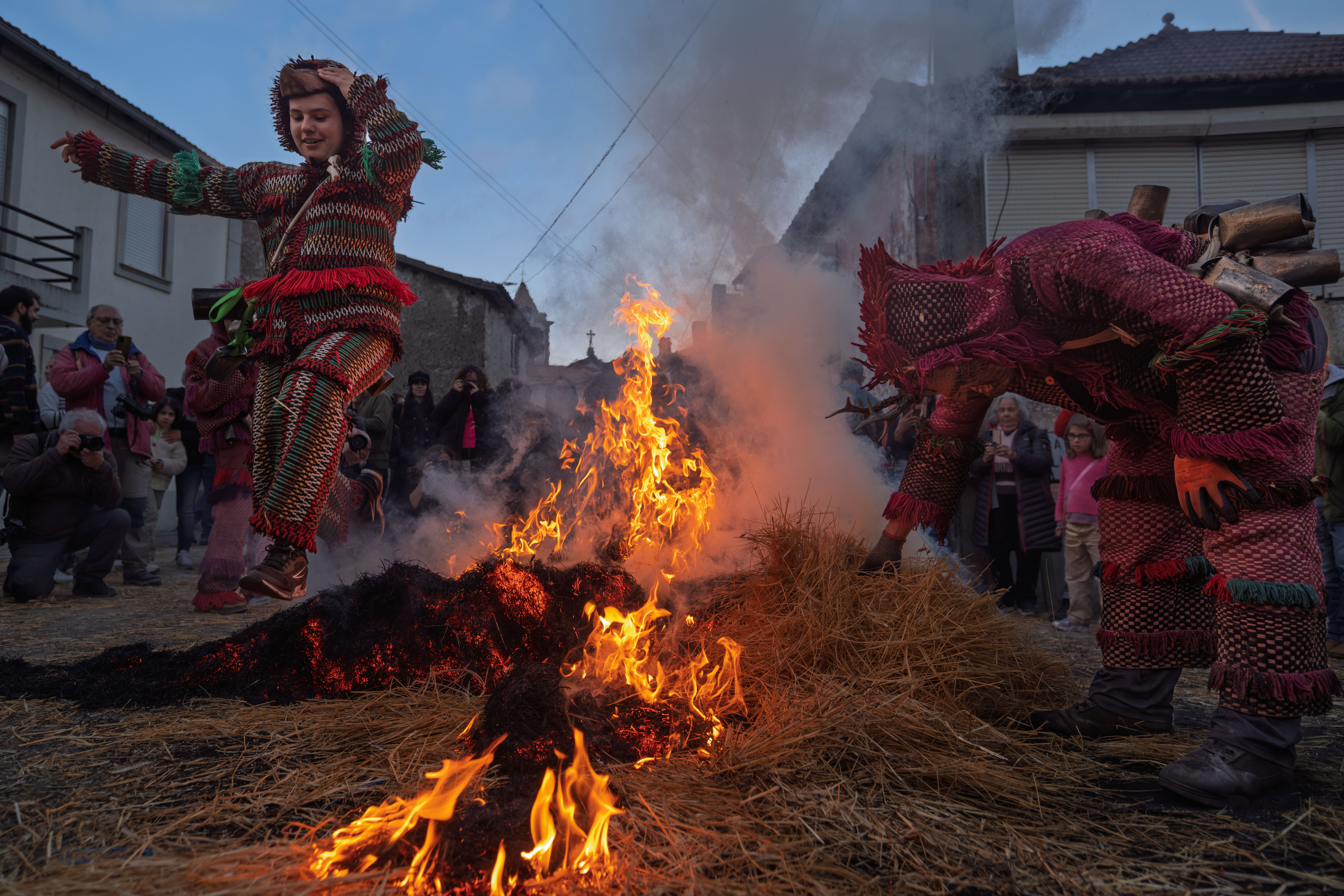
Two Caretos at the Entrudo, in Vinhais

Officially, Portugal has 13 national, government-recognised holidays. Public holidays in Portugal are regulated by the Labour Code. Besides the national holidays, there are regional holidays celebrated only in Madeira and the Azores and two facultative holidays which are the Entrudo and one municipal holiday allowed per concelho. Unlike some official holidays, Portugal's folk festivities remain widely attended and are rooted in local traditions, such as the Carnival of Ovar, Lisbon's Marchas Populares, and Porto's Festa de São João. Many of folk festivities are associated with the Santos Populares, Christian celebrations with older pagan origins linked to Midsummer. These festivities are celebrated across the country, especially in rural areas, and typically include music performances, stages, temporary arenas, and traditional food stalls.

=== Cuisine ===
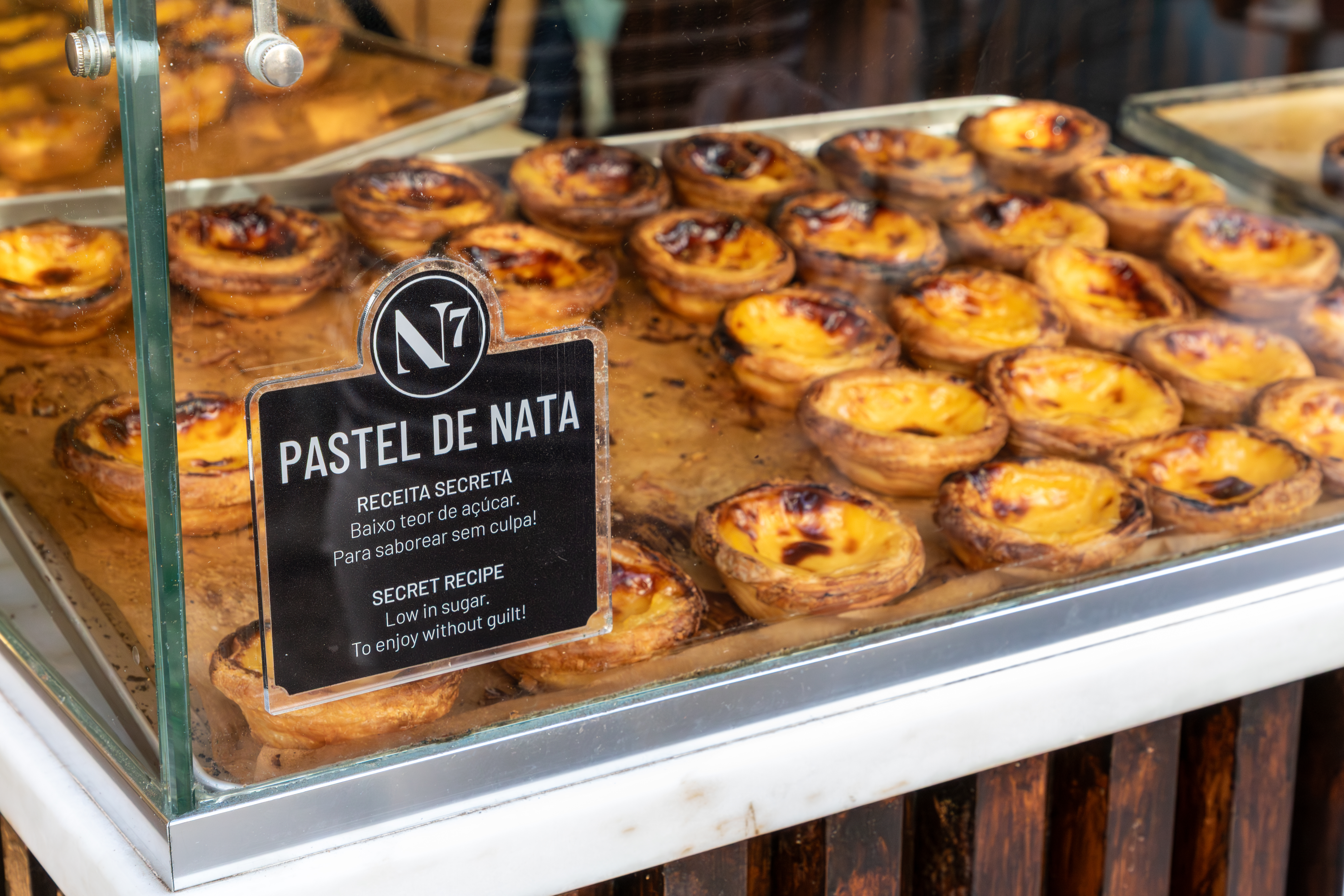
Pastéis de nata

Portuguese cuisine is influenced by both the Mediterranean and Atlantic diets. Seafood, brassicas, potatoes, bread, dairy, and olive oil are traditional staples. Bacalhau has such a broad presence in Portugal that it is considered a national dish, along with the pastel de nata. Traditional Portuguese sweets are known as conventual sweets. Large quantities of sugar and eggs are used.

Popular Portuguese beverages include its wines, a craft that is well establish since the 7th century, and of which are such examples as Port and Madeira. Beer has been brewed in Portugal since the Chalcolithic. Tea has been produced on São Miguel Island since the 19th century.

=== Sport ===
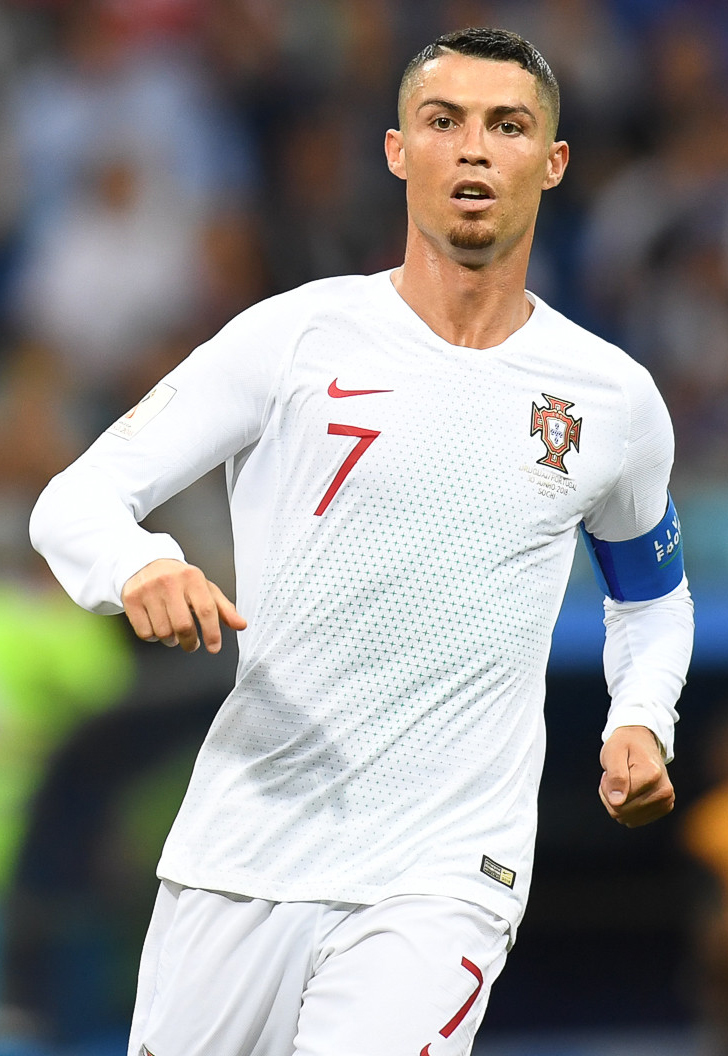
Cristiano Ronaldo is widely considered one of the greatest football players in history.

Portugal has contributed to the popularity and globalisation of sport through internationally recognised athletes such as Cristiano Ronaldo, Ricardinho, Naide Gomes, and Carlos Lopes, as well as through the popularity of its three largest football clubs. Football is the most popular sport in Portugal. The Portugal men's national football team won the UEFA European Championship in 2016 and the UEFA Nations League in 2019 and 2025.

Portugal is among the world's leading futsal countries, with its men's national team having won the FIFA Futsal World Cup in 2021, the UEFA Futsal Championship in 2018 and 2022, and the Futsal Finalissima in 2022. In athletics, the country has set several records and has earned more medals in this sport than in any other at both the Olympic and Paralympic Games. In traditional sport, Portugal is noted for its classical dressage as well as native sports such as jogo do pau and jogo da malha. Portugal has several established sporting centres across the country, including the Algarve and Lisbon, which are international golf destinations and have hosted motorsport events such as Formula One and Grand Prix motorcycle racing, as well as Nazaré and Peniche, which are known for surfing and annually host the TUDOR Nazaré Big Wave Challenge and the MEO Rip Curl Pro Portugal, respectively.

== See also ==
- Outline of Portugal
