= Carnival of Ovar =

Portuguese tourist event

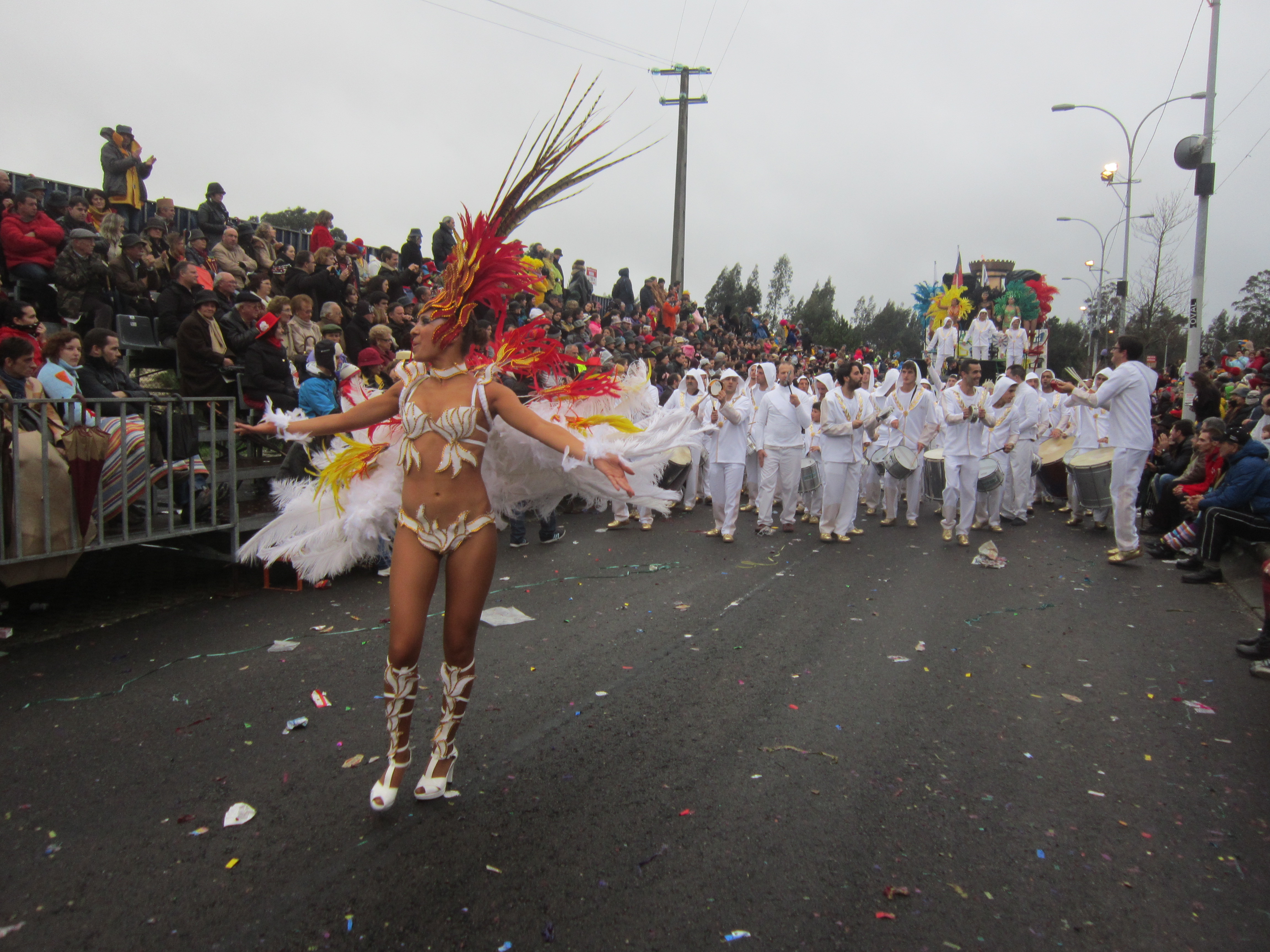
- One of Carnival of Ovar parades.
- Official name: Carnaval de Ovar
- Also called: Vitamina da Alegria (Vitamin of Joy ^{En})
- Type: Pagan, Christian, Cultural event
- Celebrations: Multiple parades and music and cultural shows
- Begins: Roughly 4 weeks before Mardi Gras
- Ends: Mardi Gras (Day before Ash Wednesday, 47 days before Easter)
- Duration: Roughly 4 weeks
- Frequency: Annual
- First time: 1952
- Related to: Ash Wednesday, Valentine's Day, Lent, Carnival

Carnival of Ovar (European Portuguese: [kaɾnɐˈval dɨ oˈvaɾ]) is a major Portuguese tourist event that takes place in Ovar, in the Aveiro Region.

This event is organized in a modern fashion, since 1952. Because it attracts thousands of visitors every year, it eventually became the trademark event of the city. Mixing local traditions with Samba school parades (since 1983) it stands as one of the most traditional celebrations in Portugal. It is also, arguably, claimed as the best Carnaval in the country.

== History ==
While the Ovar Carnival Celebrations are first mentioned in local newspapers, as early as the late 19th century, a more similar version of the current event was established around the 1950s, the so-called "Dirty Carnival". It consisted in a "dirty battle", using flour, eggs, dust or soot. The modern Organized Carnival was held for the first time in 1952, when various groups of friends, organized by neighborhoods, began to celebrate Carnival in a more creative and orderly way. Eventually, all Ovar neighborhoods joined the competition, and its popularity started to attract an increasing number of tourists.

In 1983, the first samba school in Ovar, Costa de Prata, started the contemporary era of the Ovar Carnival, introducing its current samba element.
