= Moderating power (Portugal) =

In the current Portuguese political system, approved by the 1976 constitution and revised in 1982, the functions of the President of the Republic closely resemble the concept of "moderating power." In this concept, the president uses this moderating power as a kind of checks and balances, and is independent of the three branches of government: the executive, the legislative, and the judiciary, although always in cooperation with each other.

With this power, the President ensures a balance in the system, being able to summon political agents for meetings and oversee the normal functioning of the country's democratic and political institutions.
