= University of Lisbon (1911–2013) =

University in Lisbon, Portugal

Coordinates: 38°45′09″N 9°09′32″W

- Universidade de Lisboa
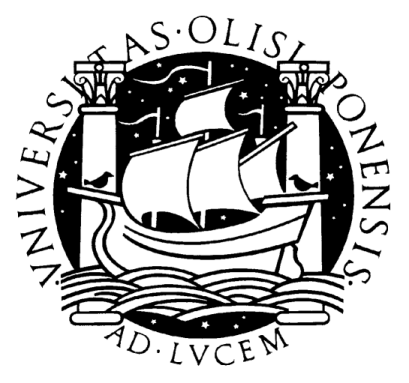
- Latin: Universitas Olisiponensis
- Motto: ad lucem "To the Light"
- Type: Public University
- Established: 1911; 2013
- Rector: António de Sampaio da Nóvoa
- Students: 20,291 (2008)
- Location: Lisbon, Portugal
- Campus: Alameda da Universidade; 1600-214 Lisbon
- Colours: Black and White (University; Rectory) Pink (Arts) Dark Red (Law) Light Brown (Education Sciences) Orange (Psychology) Yellow (Medicine) Yellow and White (Dental Medicine) Dark Green (Geography) Royal Blue (Letters) Spanish Blue (Social Sciences) Light Blue (Sciences) Violet (Pharmacy)
- Website: www.ulisboa.pt

The University of Lisbon (UL; Portuguese: Universidade de Lisboa, pronounced [univɨɾsiˈðaðɨ ðɨ liʒˈβoɐ]; Latin: Universitas Olisiponensis) was a public university in Lisbon, Portugal. It was founded in 1911 after the fall of the Portuguese monarchy and was later integrated in the new University of Lisbon along with the former Technical University of Lisbon.

== History ==
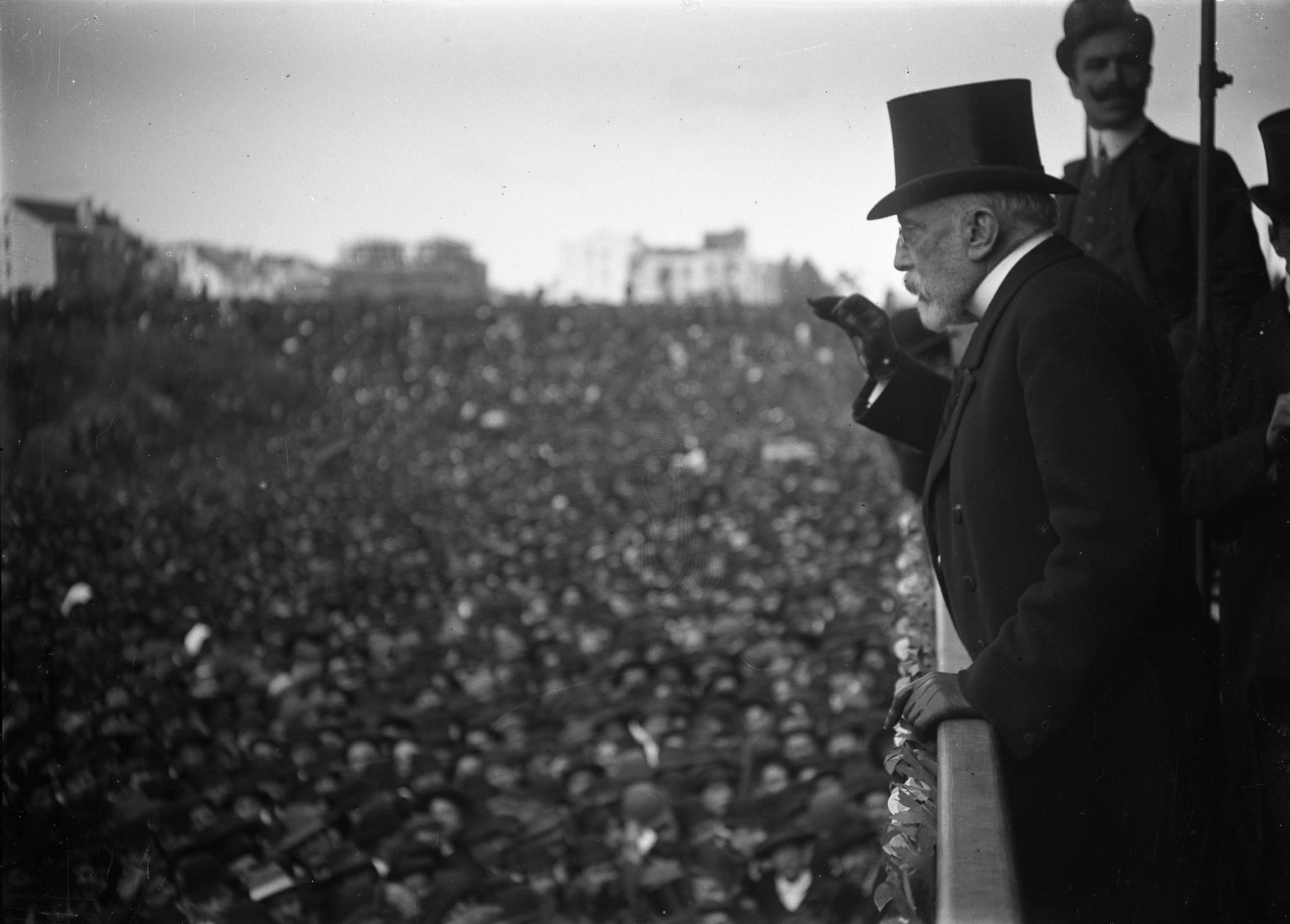
Augusto José da Cunha, first rector of the University of Lisbon during an election rally in 1908 in Lisbon

The first Portuguese university school was founded in 1290 by King Dinis in Lisbon, and was called Studium Generale (Estudo Geral). In the following 247 years, this first university school was moved several times between Lisbon and Coimbra. In 1537, during the reign of João III, the university moved definitively to Coimbra. The entire university institution, including the teaching staff and all the books from its library, were moved to Coimbra where the University of Coimbra was definitively installed. Lisbon became a university city again in 1911 when the current University of Lisbon was founded, through the union of newly created and older schools, like the 19th century Polytechnic School (Escola Politécnica), the Royal Medical School of Lisbon (Real Escola Médico-Cirúrgica de Lisboa) and the Letters Higher Studies (Curso Superior de Letras).

== Faculties ==
=== Faculty of Law ===
The Faculty of Law (Portuguese: Faculdade de Direito) was officially created by a Decree of 22 March 1911 as Faculdade de Ciências Económicas e Políticas, but was only installed in 1913, and was given its current designation later in 1918. It was originally located at the Valmor Building (Edifício Valmor) at the Campo dos Mártires da Pátria. It was transferred to its current campus at the University City (Cidade Universitária) in 1957-1958. A new building, housing the Faculty's library, was built in the late 1990s.

The only graduation given is law, and the specialised post-graduate studies available include several branches of the same area.

Among the many graduates from the faculty of law are the former Presidents of Portugal Jorge Sampaio and Mário Soares, Prime Minister Marcelo Caetano, the President of the European Commission José Manuel Durão Barroso, Portuguese statesman, deputy, and professor Adriano Moreira and businessman and former Prime Minister Francisco Pinto Balsemão. Current President Marcelo Rebelo de Sousa was a full professor there for many years, before his election in 2016. First Republic political leader and several times Prime Minister Afonso Costa was a teacher at the faculty and its founder and first dean. Television pundit and geopolitics expert Nuno Rogeiro and the writer and university professor Jaime Nogueira Pinto also studied there. Miguel Trovoada, former Prime Minister (1975–1979) and President of São Tomé and Príncipe was also one of its students, as well as Francisca Van Dunem, currently the Portuguese Minister for Justice. João Vale e Azevedo, a lawyer and former chairman of SL Benfica, was also a student and an assistant lecturer at this faculty.

=== Faculty of Sciences ===
The Faculty of Sciences (Portuguese: Faculdade de Ciências, usually abbreviated FCUL) was created on 19 April 1911 by the transformation of the former Lisbon Polytechnic School (Escola Politécnica de Lisboa). The Polytechnic School itself had been created in 1837, by the transformation and merger of the previous Royal Marine Academy (1779) and Royal College of the Nobles (1761). From 1911 until 1985 (when it moved to its current site at Campo Grande), the Faculty of Sciences was located at the former Polytechnic School building, which currently hosts the National Museum of Natural History and Science.

Its current grounds, over a built area of 75662 square meters, comprise eight buildings (labeled C1 through C8, where C stands for Ciências — Sciences) hosting classrooms, offices, cafeterias, libraries, a stationery shop, leisure areas and gardens. The faculty population, as of the 2009/2010 school year, consisted of (in parentheses, the numbers as of the 2008/2009 school year):

- 3055 graduation students (2964);
- 418 Joint degree (B.Sc.+M.Sc.) students (327)
- 1008 M.Sc. students (1218);
- 412 Ph.D. students (552);
- 388 teachers, about 95.3% hold a Ph.D. (417, 96.6%);
- 22 hired research staff (23)
- 186 non-teaching workers (204).

The computer science department has been granted several honours, namely a finalist position in the Descartes Prize and two IBM Scientific Awards.

The faculty's campus also comprises the Instituto de Biofísica e Engenharia Biomédica (IBEB), the Instituto de Oceanografia and the Instituto de Ciência Aplicada e Tecnologia (ICAT).

There are 18 graduations available, in the following areas:

- Applied Mathematics
  - Fundamental Applications branch
  - Statistics and Operations Research branch
- Applied Statistics
- Biology
  - Environmental Biology branch (Marine and Terrestrial profiles)
  - Cell biology and Biotechnology branch
  - Evolutionary and Developmental biology branch
  - Functional and Systems Biology branch
  - Molecular biology and Genetics branch
- Biochemistry
- Chemistry
- Computer Engineering — the Engineer title requires an additional 2-year Master programme, on one of the following:
  - Computer Architecture, Systems and Networks (Distributed Systems, Security, Embedded Systems, Fault tolerance)
  - Information systems (Database systems, Human-Computer Interaction, Mobile computing)
  - Interaction and Knowledge (Artificial Intelligence-driven: multi-agent system, machine learning, Natural language processing and interaction, neural networks)
  - Software Engineering (Software design, Algorithms, Programming)
- Information and Communications Technology
- Energy and Environment (partnership with Instituto Nacional de Engenharia, Tecnologia e Inovação)
- Geographical Engineering
- Geology
  - Applied geology and Environment branch
  - Geology and Natural resources branch
- Health Sciences (partnership with Faculty of Medicine of the University of Lisbon, Faculty of Dentary Medicine of the University of Lisbon, Faculty of Pharmacy of the University of Lisbon and Faculty of Letters of the University of Lisbon)
- Maths
- Physics
  - Physics branch
  - Astronomy and Astrophysics branch
  - Computational Physics branch
- Meteorology, Oceanography and Geophysics
- Microbiology (partnership with Faculty of Medicine and Faculty of Pharmacy)
- Physics Engineering (Engineering Physics)
- Biomedical Engineering & Biophysics (Biomedical engineering)
- Technological Chemistry

António de Sommer Champalimaud, a notable Portuguese business tycoon, studied at this Faculty of Sciences but did not graduate. João Magueijo, a Portuguese cosmologist and professor, studied at the Faculty of Sciences of the University of Lisbon (FCUL). Jorge Palma, singer-songwriter, studied for a while at the Faculty of Sciences before embracing a successful career in music. Nuno Crato, a Portuguese university professor, researcher, mathematician, economist, and writer who has been appointed president of both the Portuguese Mathematical Society and Taguspark, studied for a while at the Faculdade de Ciências before changing his mind and graduate at the ISEG - Instituto Superior de Economia e Gestão/Technical University of Lisbon, embracing a notable academic career. Pedro Passos Coelho, Prime Minister of Portugal, studied mathematics at the Faculty of Sciences, but did not graduate there. Branca Edmée Marques studied chemistry before moving to Paris to study radiology with Marie Curie. She would return to Lisbon to eventually become the first female professor of chemistry. Lidia Salgueiro taught physics and conducted research for over 30 years, becoming the first woman to be elected as a Corresponding Member of the Lisbon Academy of Sciences, an organization founded in 1779.

=== Faculty of Medicine ===
The Faculty of Medicine is a leading medical school, having its origins in the 19th century when the Real Escola Médico-Cirúrgica de Lisboa was founded in the city. Santa Maria's Hospital (Hospital de Santa Maria), one of the biggest Portuguese hospitals, is the teaching hospital of the faculty, and share the same installations.

António Damásio and Alexandre Carlos Caldas studied at this faculty, and Egas Moniz (a Nobel Prize winner) was a professor there.

Other noted personalities who studied at the Faculty of Medicine of the University of Lisbon include:

- António Lobo Antunes, (born 1 September 1942), Portuguese novelist.
- Joaquim Alberto Chissano, (born 22 October 1939), second President of Mozambique. (dropped out)
- João Lobo Antunes, (born 4 June 1944), a prominent Portuguese Neurosurgeon.
- Jonas Savimbi, (1934–2002), a guerrilla, military leader and politician from Angola. (dropped out)
- José Tomás de Sousa Martins, 19th century physician, noted for the esoteric cult-status achieved after his death.
- Agostinho Neto, (1922–1979), served as the first President of Angola.
- António Rendas (born 1949), medical academic and researcher
- Maria Elisa, (born in 1950), journalist and television presenter. (dropped out)
- Carlos Caldas, (born 1960), Chair of Cancer Medicine at the University of Cambridge.

=== Faculty of Letters ===
The Faculty of Letters (Portuguese: Faculdade de Letras), FLUL, was created in 1911 by the transformation of the previous Superior Studies in Letters, from which all students and professors were transferred. The Superior Studies in Letters itself had been created in 1859 by King Pedro V, from which all students and professors were transferred.

The Faculty of Letters remained installed on the facilities of the Superior Studies, an annex to the Academy of Science, until 1957, when it changed to the current building, in the University City (Cidade Universitária). In 1975, a new pavilion was built to accommodate the large influx of students who arrived after the democratization of higher education in Portugal, a consequence of the Carnation Revolution. The pavilion, theoretically provisional, still stands today. In 2001, two new buildings were finished: one to accommodate new classrooms and the Computer Room, and the Library Building, which is now the second biggest library in Portugal.

Although the faculty's graduation with most studies is modern languages and literatures (Línguas e Literaturas Modernas) (which has a number of variants, including studies in Portuguese, Spanish, English, French, German and Italian), it also offers philosophy, history (and archeology), African studies, Asian studies, European studies, cultural studies and classical studies (the degree itself is named classic languages and literatures). It is also the former home of the degree in psychology. In the mid-1980s a new Faculty of Psychology was created to accommodate it.

Notable professors at the faculty include the second President of the Portuguese Republic, Teófilo Braga, and writers Vitorino Nemésio and Urbano Tavares Rodrigues.

The poet Fernando Pessoa was a former student, though only attended for less than a year. Fialho Gouveia, a noted Portuguese television presenter, attended the Romance Philology course at the Faculdade de Letras but dropped out in order to follow a successful career in radio and television. The writer Luiz Pacheco was a student at FLUL before dropping out. The actress Alexandra Lencastre and Moonspell frontman Fernando Ribeiro also attended the philosophy course but did not graduate. Famous musician and composer Fernando Lopes-Graça also dropped out of FLUL. Football player and manager Artur Jorge graduated by FLUL after has been a student at the University of Coimbra's FLUC.

== Research ==
The Instituto de Medicina Molecular of the University of Lisbon, a research institute in molecular medicine, is one of the most noted biosciences research institutions in Portugal.

The Instituto Geofisico do Infante Dom Luiz exists since 1853 and is a research and operational unit that maintains the longest meteorological series of Portugal. Research is organized and funded through CGUL, the leading Portuguese geophysical research unit, and Associated Laboratory (with LATTEX) of the Portuguese Ministry of Science and Technology.

Researchers of LaSIGE, a research laboratory for large-scale information systems (integrated into the Department of Computer Science), have received several honors, namely an IBM Scientific Award, an Order of Engineers distinction and a place among the eight finalists of the Descartes Prize.

=== Instituto de Ciências Sociais (Institute of Social Sciences) ===
The Instituto de Ciências Sociais (ICS), an associated state laboratory, is a university institution devoted to research and advanced training in the social sciences.

The ICS focuses its research on five main subject areas: the formation of the contemporary world; the study of citizenship and democratic institutions; the problems of sustainability, linking the environment, risk and space; social changes and individual action in the context of the family, lifestyles and schooling; and issues concerning identity, migration and religion. The main subjects represented at the institute are social and cultural anthropology, political science, economics, human geography, history, social psychology and sociology.

The independent Social Science Research Group (GIS) was founded by Adérito Sedas Nunes in 1962. It became an autonomous institute of the University of Lisbon in 1982 and acquired the status of associated state laboratory in 2002.

The central activities of the ICS include: publishing research in book form and in articles in Portuguese and international journals of reference; advanced education to the level of master's degrees and doctorates; maintaining a dialogue with the international scientific community; and spreading knowledge in the wider community—an increasingly important activity to ensure the necessary interaction between science and citizenship.

Análise Social (Social Analysis), Portugal's oldest and most prestigious peer-reviewed social science journal, together with the ICS's own publishing house, Imprensa de Ciências Sociais (Social Science Press) are the most visible manifestations of the institute's activities.

The ICS is located at the University of Lisbon campus in a central area of the city next to the national library (Biblioteca Nacional). Its new offices, opened in 2003, were especially designed for the institute's research activities and postgraduate courses. The Library, which has 40,000 books and subscribes to 313 periodicals, is also home to the fast-growing Social History Archive (AHS).

Currently (2008), the institute has about 70 researchers and 100 postgraduate students and is engaged in about 200 research projects. Nearly 70 per cent of its activities are financed from its own funds, which are obtained competitively.

== See also ==
- List of universities in Portugal
- Higher education in Portugal
