= Os Grandes Portugueses =

2006 Portuguese TV series or program

- Genre: Documentary
- Developed by: Rádio e Televisão de Portugal
- Presented by: Maria Elisa
- Country of origin: Portugal
- Original language: Portuguese
- No. of episodes: 24

Production
- Production company: Rádio e Televisão de Portugal

Original release
- Network: RTP 1
- Release: 15 October 2006 – 25 March 2007

Os Grandes Portugueses (English: The Greatest Portuguese) was a public poll contest organized by the Portuguese public broadcasting station RTP and hosted by Maria Elisa. Based on BBC's 100 Greatest Britons, it featured individual documentaries advocating the top ten candidates. The final vote took place on 25 March 2007, the winner being António de Oliveira Salazar, Portugal's dictator from 1932 to 1968.

== Format ==
The series started in October 2006, with each episode featuring small groups of candidates considered amongst the Greatest Portuguese. Based on voting results, the list of 10 most voted-for personalities were revealed on 14 January 2007, in alphabetical order. All of the 10 finalists were deceased. The ten finalists were then featured in individual documentary episodes, followed by a second round of voting within these top ten. On 25 March the voting results for the final 10, and the full list of 100, was announced.

== Results ==
There are 19 women in the final list of the top 100 Greatest Portuguese, with singer and actress Amália Rodrigues rating the highest, at number 14. The list included 33 then-living persons, with former president and prime minister Mário Soares rating the highest, at number 12. A total of 66 on the list (including the 33 then-living) are predominantly 20th century figures. Of the 100 candidates presented in the opening programs, the only (likely) fictional person was Brites de Almeida, a baker who legend says killed six Castilian soldiers during the 1335 Battle of Aljubarrota, a battle in which Portuguese independence was confirmed; she appeared at number 51 when the final list was released.

== The Top-10 ==
Prime Minister António de Oliveira Salazar, whose episode was presented by Jaime Nogueira Pinto, polled the most (41%); his lifelong communist political opponent Álvaro Cunhal was second (19%), and the diplomat Aristides de Sousa Mendes third (13%).

A simultaneous opinion poll conducted by Marktest showed that, given the choice of the finalists, Salazar was the favourite of only 11%. RTP itself commissioned a simultaneous poll, conducted by Eurosondagem, which ranked Salazar 7th, with 6.6% of the vote, and Afonso I 1st with 21%. The difference of these statistically conducted polls to the final result of the Os Grandes Portugueses program suggest that the voting for the program, consisting of voluntary telephone calls, may have been skewed by repeat voters in general or organized groups of repeat voters with vested interests.

	Name	Share of Top 10 votes	Birth	Death	Occupation
	António de Oliveira Salazar	41.0%	1889	1970	President of the Council of Ministers for 36 years during the authoritarian period of the Estado Novo
	Álvaro Cunhal	19.1%	1913	2005	Communist leader during the Estado Novo regime and during the post-Carnation Revolution political scene
Aristides de Sousa Mendes	Aristides de Sousa Mendes	13.0%	1885	1954	Diplomat who fought against his own government for the safety of Jews living in Europe, during World War II, saving thousands of people.
Afonso I of Portugal	Afonso I	12.4%	1109	1185	Founder and first king of Portugal
Luís de Camões	Luís de Camões	4.0%	1524	1580	Epic and lyrical poet, author of the national epic Os Lusíadas
John II of Portugal	John II	3.0%	1455	1495	Thirteenth king of Portugal and restorer of the Atlantic Ocean and African-coast explorations
Henry the Navigator	Henry the Navigator	2.7%	1394	1460	Infante and fomenter of the Portuguese discoveries
	Fernando Pessoa	2.4%	1888	1935	Modernist poet and writer widely known for the employment of multiple heteronyms
Sebastião José de Carvalho e Melo, Marquês de Pombal	Marquês de Pombal	1.7%	1699	1782	Minister of Kingdom of José I and responsible for the reconstruction of Lisbon after the 1755 earthquake
Vasco da Gama	Vasco da Gama	0.7%	1469	1524	First explorer to discover the sea route from Europe to India

== The other 90 ==
Position	Name	Lived	
11	Salgueiro Maia	1944–1992	soldier, a key figure in the Carnation Revolution of 1974
12	Mário Soares	1924–2017	former President of the Republic
13	Saint Anthony of Lisbon	1195–1231	saint
14	Amália Rodrigues	1920–1999	fado singer
15	Eusébio	1942–2014	football player
16	Francisco Sá Carneiro	1934–1980	politician
17	Jorge Nuno Pinto da Costa	born 1937	president of Futebol Clube do Porto
18	Nuno Álvares Pereira	1360–1431	strategist and general
19	João Ferreira Annes de Almeida	1628–1691	missionary
20	José Mourinho	born 1963	football team manager
21	Agostinho da Silva	1906–1994	philosopher
22	Eça de Queiroz	1845–1900	realist writer
23	Egas Moniz	1874–1955	doctor, first Portuguese to win a Nobel Prize
24	Denis of Portugal	1261–1325	6th king of Portugal
25	Fernando Nobre	born 1951	president of the AMI foundation
26	José Hermano Saraiva	1919–2012	historian, TV host
27	Aníbal Cavaco Silva	born 1939	President of the Portuguese Republic, former Prime Minister
28	Humberto Delgado	1906–1965	military officer and politician
29	Zeca Afonso	1929–1987	singer-songwriter
30	Luís Figo	born 1972	football player
31	Marcelo Caetano	1906–1980	politician and professor
32	Pedro Nunes	1502–1578	scientist and mathematician
33	Father António Vieira	1608–1697	writer and preacher
34	Florbela Espanca	1894–1930	poet
35	Ferdinand Magellan	c. 1480–1521	navigator
36	Maria de Lurdes Pintasilgo	1930–2004	the only female prime-minister of Portugal
37	John I of Portugal	1357–1433	10th king of Portugal
38	Sophia de Mello Breyner	1919–2004	writer and poet
39	Antonia Ferreira	1811–1896	businesswoman
40	Father Américo	1887–1953	philanthroper
41	António Damásio	born 1944	scientist
42	Afonso de Albuquerque	1462–1515	military strategist and governor of India
43	Manuel I of Portugal	1469–1521	14th king of Portugal
44	José Saramago	1922–2010*	Nobel-laureate writer
45	Elizabeth of Portugal	1271–1336	The Saint Queen, queen consort of Portugal
46	Catarina Eufémia	1928–1954	popular heroine
47	Carlos Paredes	1925–2004	Portuguese guitarra player and composer
48	José Sócrates	born 1957	former Prime Minister of Portugal
49	Pedro Álvares Cabral	1467–1520	navigator who discovered Brazil
50	Ruy de Carvalho	born 1927	actor
51	Brites de Almeida, The Baker of Aljubarrota	14th century	popular heroine
52	Alberto João Jardim	born 1943	president of the Autonomous Region of Madeira
53	Almada Negreiros	1893–1970	modern painter and writer
54	Vasco Gonçalves	1921–2005	military officer and politician
55	Álvaro Siza Vieira	born 1933	architect
56	Belmiro de Azevedo	1938–2017	businessman
57	Sousa Martins	1843–1897	doctor
58	Maria do Carmo Seabra	born 1955	former minister of Education
59	Father António Andrade	1580–1624	missionary explorer
60	Charles I of Portugal	1860–1908	32nd king of Portugal
61	Mariza	born 1973	fado singer
62	Eleanor of Portugal	1458–1525	queen consort of Portugal
63	Rosa Mota	born 1958	athlete
64	António Teixeira Rebelo	1748–1825	founder of the military school
65	Afonso III of Portugal	1210–1279	5th king of Portugal
66	Vítor Baía	born 1969	football goalkeeper
67	Bartolomeu Dias	c. 1450–1500	navigator
68	Otelo Saraiva de Carvalho	1936–2021	military officer and politician
69	Cristiano Ronaldo	born 1985	football player
70	Herman José	born 1954	actor and comedian
71	Mary II of Portugal	1819–1853	queen of Portugal
72	Carlos Lopes	born 1947	athlete
73	Afonso Costa	1871–1937	politician
74	Fontes Pereira de Melo	1819–1887	politician
75	Gago Coutinho	1869–1959	geographer – first to cross the South Atlantic by plane
76	Ricardo de Araújo Pereira	born 1974	comedian
77	Manuel Sobrinho Simões	born 1947	doctor and scientist
78	Bocage	1765–1805	poet
79	Hélio Pestana	born 1985	actor, teenage idol
80	Jorge Sampaio	1939–2021	former President of the Portuguese Republic
81	António Champalimaud	1918–2004	businessman
82	António Lobo Antunes	born 1942	writer
83	Gil Vicente	c. 1465–1536	playwright
84	Maria Helena Vieira da Silva	1908–1992	painter
85	Miguel Torga	1907–1995	writer
86	Natália Correia	1923–1993	poet and writer
87	Edgar Cardoso	1913–2000	engineer
88	Fernão Mendes Pinto	c. 1510–1583	explorer and writer
89	Sister Lúcia	1907–2005	nun
90	Alfredo da Silva	1871–1942	industrialist
91	Pedro Hispano	c. 1205–1277	Pope John XXI
92	Damião de Góis	1502–1574	humanist writer and humanist
93	John IV of Portugal	1604–1656	20th king of Portugal
94	Joaquim Agostinho	1943–1984	cyclist
95	Adelaide Cabete	1867–1935	doctor
96	Almeida Garrett	1799–1854	romanticist writer
97	António Gentil Martins	born 1930	doctor
98	António Variações	1944–1984	singer-songwriter
99	Paula Rego	1935-2022	painter
100	Maria João Pires	born 1944	pianist

== Os Piores Portugueses ==
The SIC Notícias programme Eixo do Mal (Axis of Evil) held a parallel vote for Os Piores Portugueses (The Worst Portuguese), also won by António de Oliveira Salazar.

== Other editions ==
Other countries have produced similar shows; see Greatest Britons spin-offs
