= Ana Paula Martins =

Portuguese politician and pharmacist (born 1965)

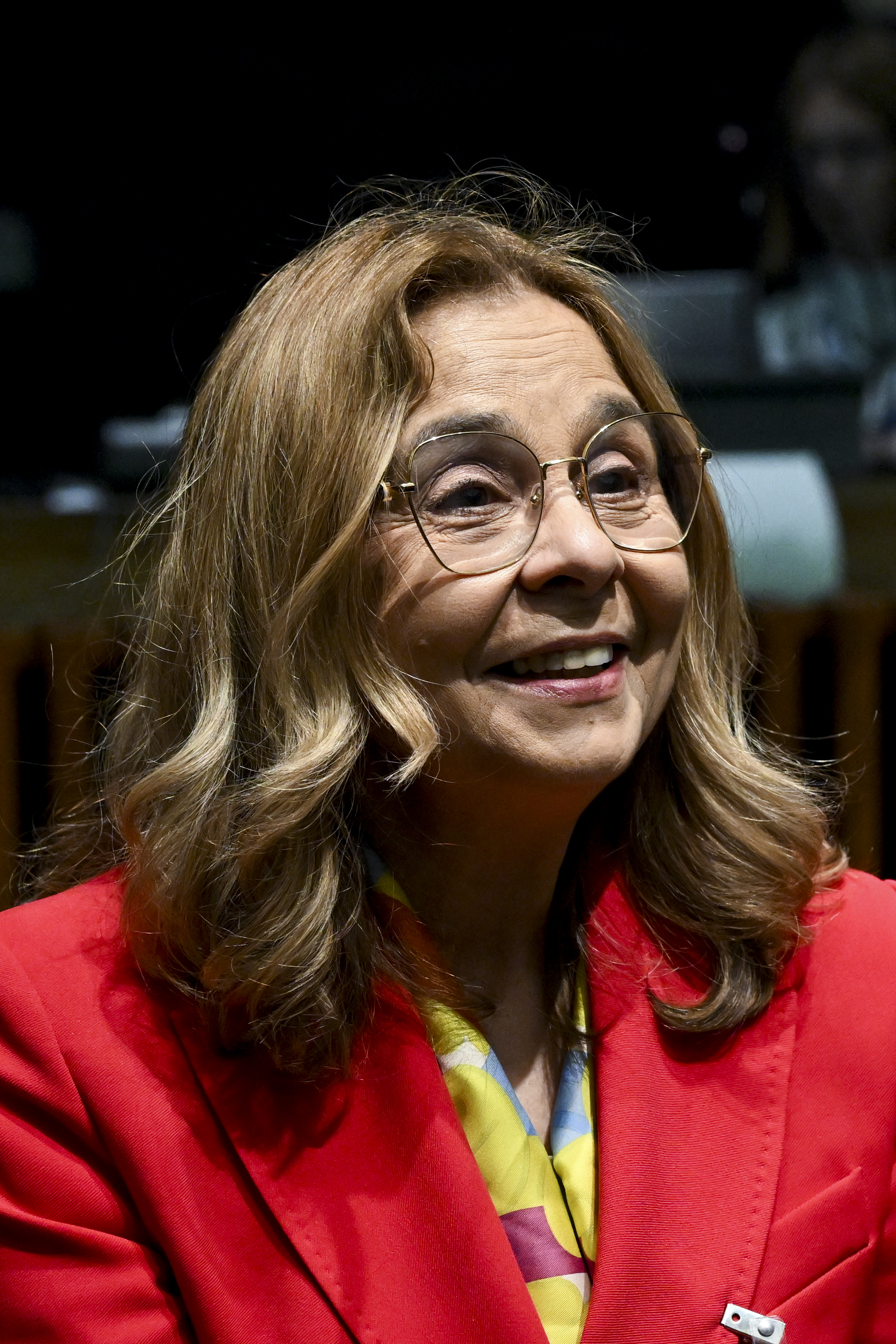
- Martins in 2025

Minister of Health
- Incumbent
- Assumed office 2 April 2024
- Prime Minister: Luís Montenegro
- Preceded by: Manuel Pizarro

Member of the Assembly of the Republic
- In office 26 March 2024 – 2 April 2024
- Constituency: Lisbon

Vice President of the Social Democratic Party
- In office 18 December 2021 – 3 July 2022
- President: Rui Rio
- Preceded by: António Maló de Abreu
- Succeeded by: Paulo Rangel

President of the Order of Pharmacists
- In office 8 February 2016 – 7 February 2022
- Preceded by: Carlos Maurício Barbosa
- Succeeded by: Hélder Mota Filipe

Personal details
- Born: Ana Paula Mecheiro de Almeida Martins; 4 November 1965 (age 60) Bissau, Portuguese Guinea, Portugal
- Citizenship: Portugal
- Party: Social Democratic Party (2002–present)
- Spouse: Alberto Silvestre Correia
- Children: 2
- Education: University of Lisbon
- Occupation: Pharmacist • politician

Ana Paula Mecheiro de Almeida Martins Silvestre Correia (born 4 November 1965) is a Portuguese pharmacist and politician of the Social Democratic Party who has been serving as Minister of Health in the government of Prime Minister Luís Montenegro since 2024.

Martins was elected to the Assembly of the Republic in the March 2024 national election as a member of the Social Democratic Party, representing the Lisbon constituency.

== Early life and education ==
Martins graduated in Pharmaceutical Sciences from the Faculty of Pharmacy of the University of Lisbon in 1990. She completed her master's degree in Epidemiology at the Faculty of Medical Sciences of the Universidade Nova de Lisboa in 1995 and her PhD in Clinical Pharmacy at the Faculty of Pharmacy of Lisbon in May 2005.

== Early career ==
For more than 20 years Martins was an assistant professor at the Faculty of Pharmacy of the University of Lisbon, held the position of director of "External Affairs and Market Access" at MSD Portugal between 2006 and 2014 and also directed the center for Pharmacoepidemiology Studies of the National Association of Pharmacy between 1994 and 2006.

Between 1989 and 1992 she was general secretary of the Order of Pharmacists. She was President of the Board of the Regional General Assembly of the South and Autonomous Regions of the Order of Pharmacists between 2009 and 2015. Between 2016 and the beginning of 2022, she held the position of President of the Order of Pharmacists, presided over the Institute of Evidence-Based Health and coordinated the Pharmacovigilance Center of Lisbon, Setúbal and Santarém of the Faculty of Pharmacy of the University of Lisbon for several years. Between December 2022 and January 2024 she was Director of the Hospital de Santa Maria, in Lisbon.

== Political career ==
From December 2021 until May 2022 Martins was vice president of the PSD, under the leadership of Rui Rio. In January 2024, she was announced as candidate number three, on the Lisbon list of the Social Democratic Party for the 2024 legislative elections, behind Luís Montenegro and Joaquim Miranda Sarmento.
