= 2000 in Portuguese television =

This is a list of Portuguese television related events from 2000.

== Events ==
- 29 June - SIC launches their first pay TV channel SIC Gold.
- 3 September - The Portuguese version of Big Brother debuts.
- September - In the second series of Quem quer ser milionário?, Maria Elisa Domingues becomes the first female host in the Millionaire franchise to crown a millionaire, when Ana Damásio wins the jackpot of 50 million escudos.
- 31 December - The first series of Big Brother is won by Zé Maria Seleiro.
- Unknown - Nadia Sousa, performing as Edith Piaf wins the seventh and final series of Chuva de Estrelas.

== Debuts ==
- January - Quem quer ser milionário? (2000-2008, 2013–present)
- 3 September - Big Brother (2000-2003)

=== International ===
- (United States) Law & Order: Special Victims Unit (Unknown)

== Ending this year ==
- Chuva da Estrelas (1993-2000)
