= Os Piores Portugueses =

Os Piores Portugueses (lit. 'The Worst Portuguese') was a poll organized by the debate program Eixo do Mal of SIC Notícias to determine which Portuguese figures contributed the most to the country's ruin. It competed and parodied the poll for Great Portuguese (Os Grandes Portugueses).

There were two categories for each poll, each featuring 20 semi-finalists:

1. Who most contributed to the ruin of Portugal? - Won by António de Oliveira Salazar, also the winner of Os Grandes Portugueses.
2. Who better incarnates the worst qualities of the Portuguese People? - Won by Fátima Felgueiras.

== The candidates for Worst Portuguese ==
Who most contributed to the ruin of Portugal?
Name	Lived	Notable Events and Rationale	Great Portuguese Rank
Afonso Costa	1871-1937	Republican activist, Prime Minister of Portugal during the First Portuguese Republic	73
António de Almeida Santos	1926-2016	Socialist Party Politician	None
Álvaro Cunhal	1913-2005	Former leader of the Portuguese Communist Party	2
Aníbal Cavaco Silva	born 1939	Then President of Portugal, former Prime Minister of Portugal.	27
António Guterres	born 1949	Former Prime Minister of Portugal.	None
Manuel Gonçalves Cerejeira	1888-1977	Cardinal Patriarch of Lisbon during Estado Novo	None
The horse of Afonso, Prince of Portugal	fl. 1491	By falling and killing the heir of the throne and husband to the heiress of Castile and Aragon, prevented the union of the Iberian kingdoms under Portuguese hegemony.	None
The trumpeter of Afonso I of Portugal	fl. 1143	During a loot, he lost his trumpet which he was meant to play to order the loot to be finished, metaphorically meaning the looting is still going on.	None
Afonso I of Portugal	died 1185	The first King of Portugal and founder of the country; nominated for that exact reason.	4
John III of Portugal	1502-1557	King of Portugal during the Inquisition	None
King Sebastian	1554–1578	Boy-king who became entangled in the Moroccan civil war, a Muslim country he understood very little about, ultimately leading to his fall at the Battle of Ksar El Kebir and leaving the country at the mercy of Spain.	None
José Manuel Durão Barroso	1956–	Former Prime Minister of Portugal, left office to become President of the European Commission, leaving Pedro Santana Lopes as his successor.	None
Sister Lúcia	1907–2005	Claimed to have seen and talked to the Virgin Mary at Fátima in 1917. She later became a nun.	89
Marcelo Caetano	1906-1980	Successor to António de Oliveira Salazar as the ruler of Estado Novo	31
Mário Soares	1924–2017	Former Prime Minister of Portugal and President of Portugal.	12
António de Oliveira Salazar	1889–1970	Dictatorial Prime Minister of Portugal during the Estado Novo, which repressed democratic movements and involved Portugal in a costly colonial war in Africa.	1
Otelo Saraiva de Carvalho	1936-2021	Chief strategist of Carnation Revolution and FP-25 leader	68
Sidónio Pais	1872-1918	President of the First Portuguese Republic	None
Cunha Rodrigues	Born 1940	Former Attorney-general of the republic	None
Vasco Gonçalves	1921-2005	Prime Minister of Portugal during PREC	54

Who better incarnates the worst qualities of the Portuguese People?
Name	Lived	Notable Events and Rationale	Great Portuguese Rank
Maria Severa	1820-1846	Fado singer. Portrayed as the founder of the genre	None
pt:Maria de Jesus Caetano Freire	1894-1981	António de Oliveira Salazar's maid	None
Dona Branca	1902-1992	Fraudster, Ponzi scheme maintainer	None
António Egas Moniz	1874-1955	Neurologist, lobotomy inventor, first Portuguese winner of the Nobel Prize	23
Fátima Felgueiras	Born 1954	Former mayor of Felgueiras, involved in various corruption scandals	None
Fernando Mamede	1951-2026	10,000 metres athlete known to frequently crack under pressure	None
Florbela Espanca	1894-1930	Poet	34
Valentim Loureiro	Born 1938	Former mayor of Gondomar, chairman of Boavista F.C. and of the LPFP, involved in various corruption scandals in all titles	None
Kaúlza de Arriaga	1915-2004	Far-right politician, founder of MIRN-PDP	None
Lili Caneças	Born 1944	Socialite	None
Portuguese husbands			
Paulo Portas	Born 1962	Former president of CDS – People's Party	None
Pina Manique	1733-1805	Magistrate during the Absolutism	None
Joaquim Pina Moura	1952-2020	Former finance and economy minister	None
Jorge Nuno Pinto da Costa	1937-2025	Chairman of FC Porto, involved in corruption scandals	17
José Maria Martins		Lawyer, known for defending Carlos Silvino in the Casa Pia child sexual abuse scandal	None
Tomás Taveira	Born 1938	Architect and professor. Involved in a sex tape scandal, where he was shown having sex with (amongst others) some of his students	None
José Maria Saleiro	Born 1973	Big Brother 1 winner	None
Alberto João Jardim	Born 1943	Then president of the Autonomous Region of Madeira	52
Américo Thomaz	1894-1987	President of Portugal during Estado Novo	None
