= The Colours of the Empire =

2006 non-fiction book by Patrícia Ferraz de Matos

As Côres do Império: Representações Raciais no Império Colonial Português
- Author: Patrícia Ferraz de Matos
- Translator: Mark Ayton
- Language: Portuguese
- Publisher: Instituto de Ciências Sociais, Berghahn Books
- Publication date: 2006
- Publication place: Portugal
- English publication date: 2013
- ISBN: 978-972-671-185-8

The Colours of the Empire: Racialized Representations during Portuguese Colonialism (Portuguese: As Côres do Império: Representações Raciais no Império Colonial Português) is an anthropology book by Patrícia Ferraz de Matos. It was published in 2006 by the Instituto de Ciências Sociais. An English translation by Mark Ayton was published in 2013 by Berghahn Books.
