= Casa Pia =

Portuguese educational institution

Casa Pia de Lisboa, I. P.
- Casa Pia de Lisboa, Instituto Público
- Coat of Arms of Portugal

Public Institute overview
- Formed: July 3, 1780; 246 years ago
- Type: Public Institute
- Jurisdiction: Portugal
- Status: Active
- Headquarters: Avenida do Restelo 1, Lisbon, Portugal; 38°41′57″N 9°12′24″W
- Motto: Promotion of the rights and protection of children and young people
- Public Institute executive: Fátima Matos, President of the Board of Directors
- Parent department: Government of Portugal
- Parent Ministry: Ministry of Labour, Solidarity and Social Security
- Key documents: Organic Law of Casa Pia de Lisboa, I. P.; Statutes of Casa Pia de Lisboa, I. P.
- Website: www.casapia.pt

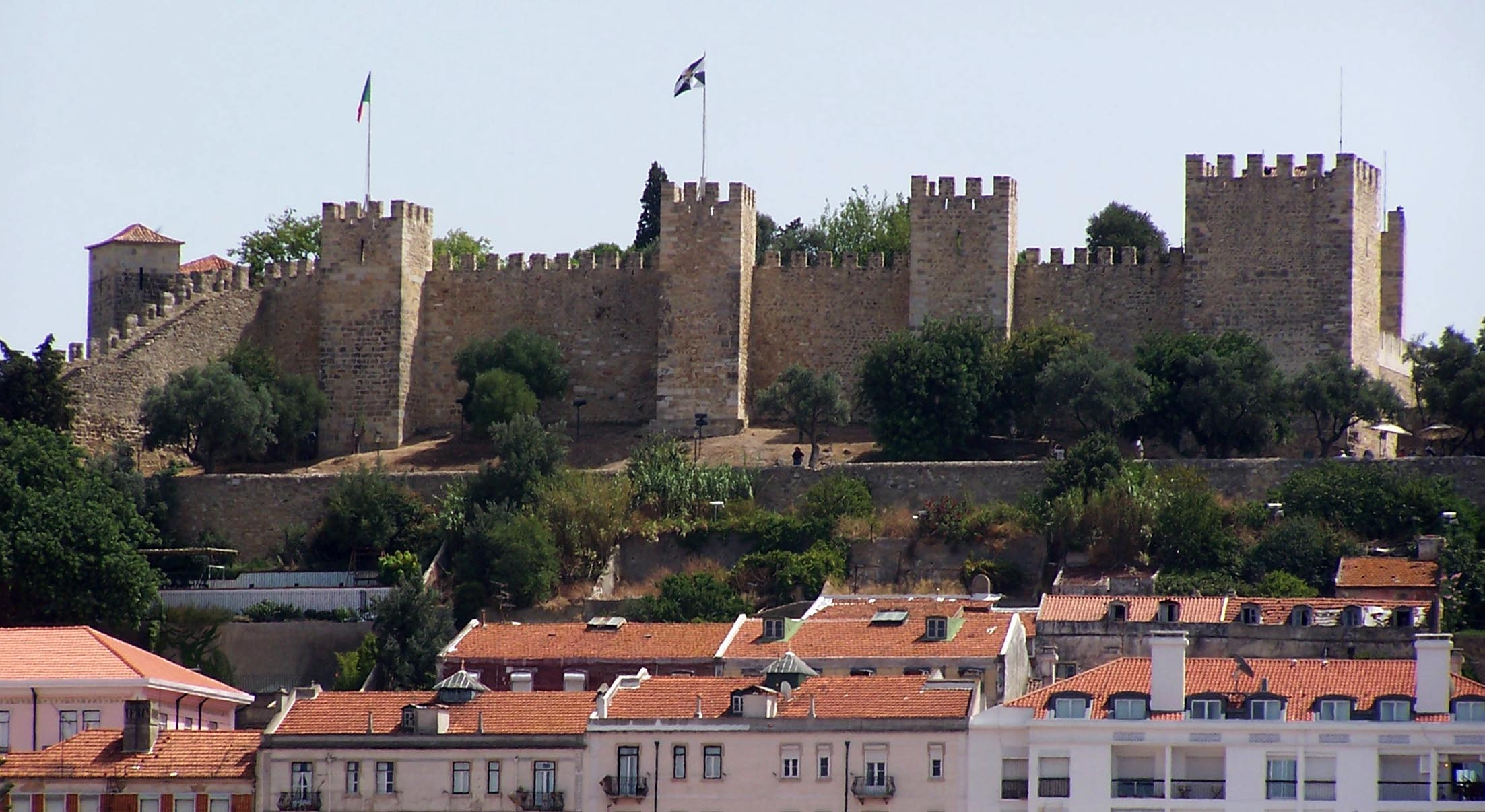
The Castle of São Jorge, Casa Pia's first location

The Casa Pia is a Portuguese institution founded by Maria I, known as A Pia ("Mary the Pious"), and organized by Police Intendant Pina Manique in 1780, following the social disarray of the 1755 Lisbon earthquake. For almost three centuries, thousands of young boys and girls were raised by Casa Pia, including many public personalities, called casapianos. Casa Pia is Portugal's largest educational institution dedicated to helping youngsters in risk of social exclusion or without parental support.

The organisation is composed of ten schools and enrolls approximately 4700 students. In addition to standard schooling, the organisation also provides boarding for children in need. It strives to enable these youngsters to become healthy and successful members of society, by developing intellectual, manual, and physical traits, in an environment promoting spiritual, moral, and religious values. The institution is proud to have had amongst its students many outstanding Portuguese personalities, including politicians, journalists, and artists.

The first location was in Castle of São Jorge of Lisbon, an important center of production for the Portuguese Royal Navy and Army, and also for vocational education: masters trained at Casa Pia, when returned to their home, instruct others in the same profession. More advanced alumni may advance to professional careers. Next level course studies at London (for medicine), the Portuguese Royal Navy academy, Rome, and the Portuguese Academy.

Two years after the death of Pina Manique, the Casa Pia closed due to the occupation of the Castle of São Jorge by the French troops of Junot. The school reopened in 1812 at Convento do Desterro, and then the government moved the institution to Jerónimos Monastery, Lisbon at 1833. In 1942, it created a network of homes for children. At this time it is formed by:

- Colégio de Pina Manique
- Colégio de D. Maria Pia
- Colégio de D. Nuno Álvares Pereira
- Colégio de Santa Clara
- Colégio de Santo Christo
- Colégio de Nossa Senhora da Conceição
- Colégio de Santa Catarina
- Colégio de António Aurélio da Costa Ferreira
- Escola Agrícola de Francisco Margiochi - polo do Arrife e polo da Paiã
- Centro Educativo e de Apoio Social do Monte da Caparica

And also as complementary services:

- Provedoria
- Centro Cultural Casapiano
- Colónia Balnear da Areia Branca (Lourinhã)
- Centro de Educação Ambiental e Cultural de Colares
- Equipamento de férias do Arrife
- Equipamento de férias da Matela

== Sports ==
Casa Pia A.C. is Casa Pia's multisports club founded in 1920 and based in Lisbon, Portugal. Its professional men's football team plays in Primeira Liga. Besides football, Casa Pia Atlético Clube has competitive futsal, gymnastics, handball, hockey, karate, sport fishing, table tennis, weightlifting and wrestling departments.

== Scandal ==
Casa Pia de Lisboa made world headlines because of a major child sexual abuse scandal. Incidents reportedly began occurring starting in the 1960s, but were only revealed in 2002. Many prominent people were arrested, including Paulo Pedroso, (former Socialist minister, with charges later dropped), Portuguese TV host Carlos Cruz and former ambassador Jorge Ritto, among others.

As a result, the scandal and the Lisbon trial inundated public life with sordid child abuse stories, leading to a media circus from 2003 to 2005. On September 3, 2010, after one of the longest trials in Portuguese history Carlos Cruz (seven years), Carlos Silvino (eighteen years), Hugo Marçal (six years, two months), Manuel Abrantes (five years, nine months), Ferreira Diniz (seven years) and Jorge Ritto (six years, eight months) were convicted on charges of pedophilia and other crimes that had occurred in the late 1990s and early 2000s. This was the first time an institutional sex abuse scandal was taken to court in Portugal.

== See also ==
- Casa Pia Atlético Clube
