= Teresa Nogueira Pinto =

Portuguese professor

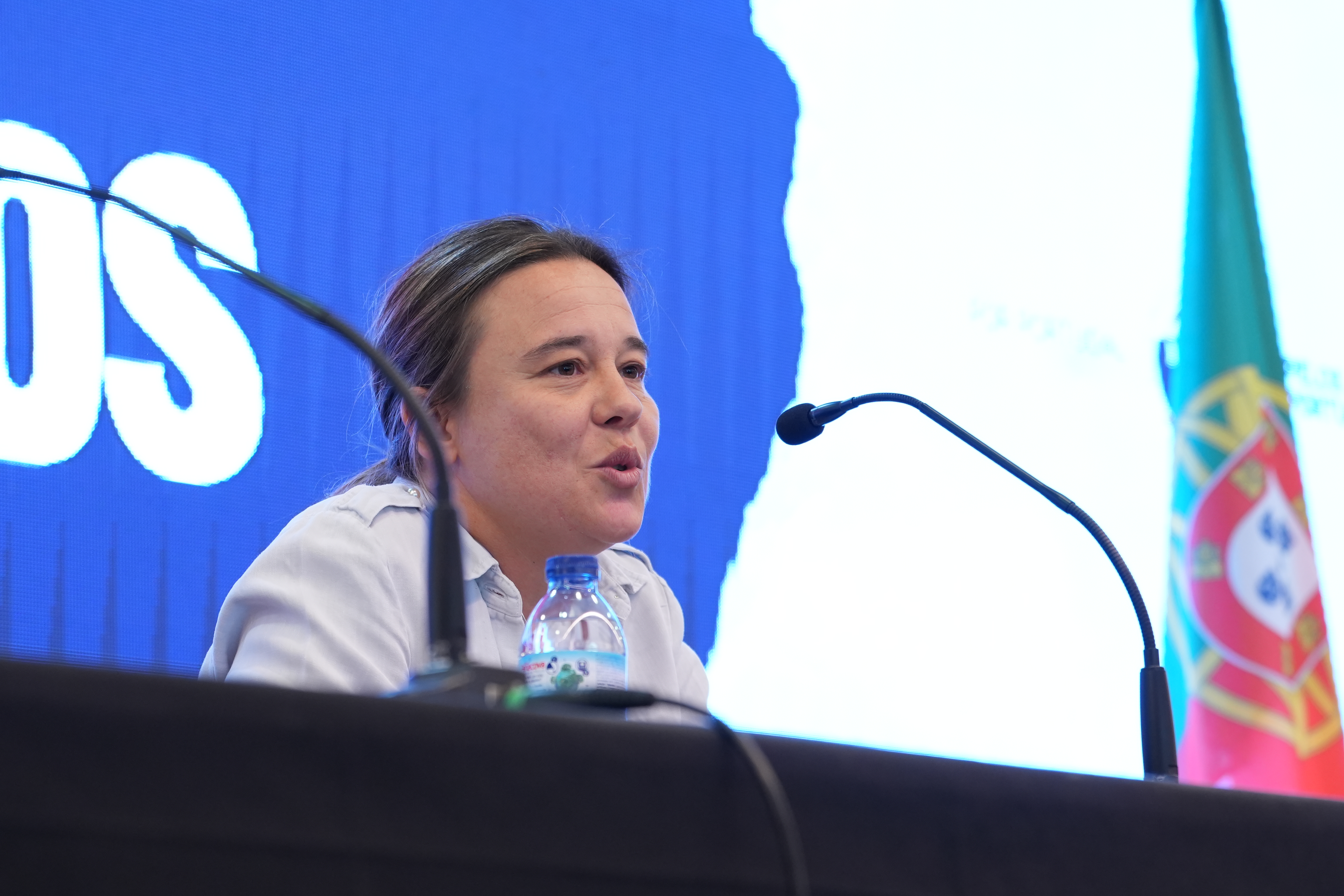
- Nogueira Pinto in 2024

Shadow Minister of Culture, Youth and Sports
- Incumbent
- Assumed office 19 September 2025
- Leader: André Ventura
- Preceded by: Office established

Personal details
- Born: Maria Teresa de Avilez Nogueira Pinto; 11 June 1984 (age 42) Lisbon, Portugal
- Party: Chega
- Parent(s): Jaime Nogueira Pinto (father); Maria José Nogueira Pinto (mother)
- Relatives: Maria João Avillez (aunt); Francisco van Zeller (uncle); Sophia de Mello Breyner Andresen (cousin); Miguel Sousa Tavares (cousin)
- Education: Catholic University of Portugal
- Occupation: professor • Writer

Maria Teresa de Avilez Nogueira Pinto (born 11 June 1984) is a Portuguese professor and writer. She currently serves as Shadow Minister of Culture, Youth and Sports in the Shadow Cabinet of André Ventura.
