= 2000 in Philippine television =

The following is a list of events affecting Philippine television in 2000. Events listed include television show debuts, finales, cancellations, and channel launches, closures and rebrandings, as well as information about controversies and carriage disputes.

== Events ==
=== January ===
- January 1 - ABS-CBN launched ELJ Communications Center, the new media company headquarters located in Quezon City's South Triangle. The network also unveiled a new station ID, which features the then-newly introduced 1999 logo.

=== February ===
- February 25 - Radio Philippines Network celebrated its 40th anniversary.

=== March ===
- March 1
  - GMA Network celebrated its 50th anniversary.
  - IBC 13 celebrated its 40th anniversary.
- March 7 - ABS-CBN inaugurating its Millennium Transmitter in the company grounds, resulting in a clearer signal for its television and radio stations in Mega Manila.
- March 25 - An unknown constestant won the total jackpot prize of ₱920,000 on Eat Bulaga!'s Meron o Wala.

=== June ===
- June 14 - GMA Network Center, the new headquarters of GMA Network, was inaugurated in the celebration of its 50th anniversary.
- June 19 - ABC 5 celebrated its 40th anniversary.

=== August ===
- August 2 - GMA Network launches Imbestigador.

=== October ===
- October 28 - Charito Ignacio won the jackpot prize of one million pesos for the first time on Eat Bulaga!'s Laban o Bawi.

=== December ===
- December 8 - Rolling coverage of the impeachment trial of President Joseph Estrada on all television stations begins.

=== Unknown ===
- DOMSAT became a subsidiary of Solar Entertainment Corporation (Solar). As its subsidiary, DOMSAT's teleport is being used by Solar to produce, originate, and distribute its various television program services. Its full service digital broadcast teleport features server technology in Barangay Sta. Cruz, Sumulong Highway, Antipolo, Rizal. It is built around two encoder platforms, Scientific Atlanta Power Vu Classic (DVB) and Motorola Digicipher II (MPEG-@). Program origination is done on a SeaChange Media Cluster Server System. The facility includes a 500 square meter studio and various linear and non-linear production bays. Solar Entertainment first launched its namesake entertainment cable channel in the early 2000s, one devoted to American programs. This channel was later known as Solar USA (the acronym stands for "Ultimate in Suspense and Action"), and then later simply as USA before it was replaced by two separate channels.

== Premieres ==
Date	Show
January 10	Pura Sangre on ABS-CBN 2
January 10	Rosalinda on ABS-CBN 2
January 16	Power Rangers Lost Galaxy on ABS-CBN 2
January 17	Balita Alas Singko ng Umaga on ABS-CBN 2
February 7	Wedding Peach on ABS-CBN 2
February 20	PBA on Viva TV on Viva TV (IBC 13)
February 21	Ronda Trese on IBC 13
March 2	Guinness World Records on ABC 5
March 2	ABC Mega Series on ABC 5
March 4	Viva Premiere Night on IBC 13
March 4	Saturday Night Movies on ABC 5
March 5	Star Studio Presents on ABS-CBN 2
March 6	Macron 1 on ABC 5
March 6	Freakazoid! on ABC 5
March 6	Spy Game on ABC 5
March 6	Beach Patrol on ABC 5
March 7	Superman: The Animated Series on ABC 5
March 7	Team Knight Rider on ABC 5
March 20	Hell Teacher Nūbē on GMA 7
March 22	Master of Mosquiton on GMA 7
March 23	Monster Ranchers on GMA 7
March 24	Fushigi Yuugi on GMA 7
March 24	Sunny Pig on GMA 7
April 3	Street Fighter II V on ABS-CBN 2
April 3	Bantay Bata: The Series on ABS-CBN 2
April 7	Kasangga Mo ang Langit on RPN 9
April 8	Biyaheng Langit on RPN 9
April 10	Tago Ka Na! on GMA 7
April 24	Super Doll Licca on ABS-CBN 2
April 24	Akazukin Chacha on Viva TV (IBC 13)
April 24	May Bukas Pa on Viva TV (IBC 13)
April 27	Private Conversations with Boy Abunda on ABS-CBN News Channel
April 29	Kiss Muna on GMA 7
April 29	H2K: Hati-Hating Kapatid on Viva TV (IBC 13)
May 1	Good Morning, Pilipinas on PTV 4
May 1	TV Patrol Northern Mindanao on ABS-CBN TV-2 Cagayan de Oro
May 6	Pinoy Music Video on IBC 13
May 15	Guide To Urban Living on Studio 23
May 22	Good Take on IBC 13
May 23	DMZ TV on IBC 13
May 26	Last Fool Show on IBC 13
June 2	Digimon Adventures on ABS-CBN 2
June 5	Jester, the Adventurer on ABS-CBN 2
June 5	Umulan Man o Umaraw on GMA 7
June 10	Kagat ng Dilim on Viva TV (IBC 13)
June 17	Takoyaki Mantleman on GMA 7
June 26	Swiss Family Robinson on ABS-CBN 2
June 29	Subic Bay on Viva TV (IBC 13)
July 3	TV Patrol Central Visayas on ABS-CBN TV-3 Cebu
July 3	RPN Arangkada Balita on RPN 9
July 3	Primetime Balita on RPN 9
July 10	The Daily Show with Jon Stewart on GMA 7
July 14	The Truth And Nothing But on RPN 9
July 23	Convergence on Net 25
July 27	Zoboomafoo on Net 25
July 27	Call for Help on Net 25
July 27	Beyond 2000 on Net 25
July 27	Audio File on Net 25
July 27	Zip File on Net 25
July 27	ZDTV News on Net 25
July 27	Extended Play on Net 25
July 31	Gadget Boy on GMA 7
August 2	Imbestigador on GMA 7
August 5	Gags Must Be Crazy on Viva TV (IBC 13)
August 14	Quinceañera on RPN 9
August 26	Night Lines on Viva TV (IBC 13)
September 2	Barangay Dos on ABS-CBN 2
September 4	Daniela's Diary on ABS-CBN 2
September 4	Munting Anghel on GMA 7
September 7	Soldier of Fortune, Inc. on ABC 5
September 7	The Burning Zone on ABC 5
September 9	Kakabakaba on GMA 7
September 17	Idol Ko si Kap on GMA 7
September 25	Siempre te Amaré on RPN 9
September 29	Malcolm In The Middle on RPN 9
October 2	Serafín on RPN 9
October 2	Maria del Cielo on RPN 9
October 2	May Bukas Pa on RPN 9
October 12	South Park on Channel V Philippines
October 30	Angie Girl on ABS-CBN 2
October 30	Trigun on GMA 7
October 30	Alas Suerte on IBC 13
October 30	Amerika Atbp. on IBC 13
October 31	Talkback on ANC
October 31	Virtua Fighter on GMA 7
November 4	Lunch Break on IBC 13
November 13	Pangako Sa 'Yo on ABS-CBN 2
November 13	Who Wants to Be a Millionaire? on Viva TV (IBC 13)
November 20	ABS-CBN Headlines on ABS-CBN 2
November 27	TV Patrol Northern Luzon on ABS-CBN TV-3 Baguio
November 28	Bubblegum Crisis Tokyo 2040 on GMA 7
December 4	Tuwing Kapiling Ka on GMA 7
December 9	Arriba, Arriba! on ABS-CBN 2

=== Unknown ===
- For Kids Only on RPN 9
- Metro TV on RPN 9
- Ikaw at ang Batas on RPN 9
- Kakampi on RPN 9
- Ratsada Balita on RPN 9
- Sa Bayan sa RPN 9
- Pan sa Kinabuhi on RPN 9
- Tapatan with Jay Sonza on RPN 9
- Jai Alai: The Game of a Thousand Thrills on PTV 4
- Battle of the Brains on PTV 4
- Inside NCAA on PTV 4
- Komentaryo on PTV 4
- Nature Trip on PTV 4
- She! on PTV 4
- Sultada on PTV 4
- Tapatan: Walang Atrasan Boxing on PTV 4
- Barangay Dos on ABS-CBN 2
- Kontrapelo on ABS-CBN 2
- Feel at Home on ABS-CBN 2
- Pahina on ABS-CBN 2
- Isyu 101 on ABS-CBN 2
- Pinoy Exposèd on ABS-CBN 2
- Megarangers on ABS-CBN 2
- Mystic Knights of Tir Na Nog on ABS-CBN 2
- Young Hercules on ABS-CBN 2
- Citizens Patrol on IBC 13
- Golf Power on IBC 13
- Milo Sporting World on IBC 13
- Planet Speed on IBC 13
- World Pool Championships on IBC 13
- A Taste of Life with Heny Sison on IBC 13
- Now Showing on IBC 13
- Thursday Night at the Movies on IBC 13
- Viva Proudly Presents on IBC 13
- Iglesia ni Cristo and the Bible on IBC 13
- Out of Time on UNTV 37
- GMA Drama Studio Presents on GMA 7
- Kahit Na Magtiis on GMA 7
- May Himala on GMA 7
- What Went Wrong? on GMA 7
- Super Banks on GMA 7
- Ecclesia In Asia: Ang Misa on GMA 7
- Gadget Boy & Heather on GMA 7
- Ranma ½ on GMA 7
- Recess (Disney Adventures) on GMA 7
- The Vision of Escaflowne on GMA 7
- SBN Music Videos on SBN 21
- Kids Against Crime on ZOE TV 11
- Kids Club on ZOE TV 11
- Batang Kaharian on ETV 39
- Niño Felipin on ABS-CBN 2
- Business Nightly on ANC
- Fashion Emergency on E! Philippines
- E! Search Party on E! Philippines
- Wild On on E! Philippines
- Extreme Close Up on E! Philippines
- TV Patrol Chavacano on ABS-CBN TV-3 Zamboanga
- TV Patrol Socsksargen on ABS-CBN TV-3 General Santos
- B-Robo Kabutack on ABC 5
- Diagnosis: Murder on ABC 5
- F/X: The Series on ABC 5
- Hercules: The Legendary Journeys on ABC 5
- High Tide on ABC 5
- New York Undercover on ABC 5
- Princess Tenko on ABC 5
- Police Academy: The Series on ABC 5
- Sliders on ABC 5
- Soldier of Fortune on ABC 5
- Strangers on ABC 5
- Tarzan on ABC 5
- Team Knight Rider on ABC 5
- The Burning Zone on ABC 5
- The Powers of Matthew Star on ABC 5
- Time Quest on ABC 5
- Zorro on ABC 5
- Beetle Fighters Platinum on IBC 13
- Robotack on IBC 13
- Zyurangers on IBC 13

== Programs transferring networks ==
Date	Show	No. of seasons	Moved from	Moved to
April 24	Akazukin Chacha	—N/a	ABS-CBN	IBC
July 15	University Athletic Association of the Philippines	63	PTV	Studio 23
July 22	National Collegiate Athletic Association	76	IBC	PTV
August	Compañero y Compañera	—N/a	GMA Network	RPN
October 2	May Bukas Pa	—N/a	IBC	RPN
Unknown	Tapatan with Jay Sonza	—N/a	GMA	RPN
Unknown	Del Monte Kitchenomics	—N/a	GMA	ABS-CBN
Unknown	Battle of the Brains	—N/a	RPN	PTV
Unknown	For Kids Only	—N/a	ABS-CBN	RPN
Unknown	Ang Dating Daan	—N/a	PTV	SBN
Unknown	Zyurangers	—N/a	ABC	IBC

== Finales ==
- January 7:
  - Cristy Per Minute (ABS-CBN 2)
  - Chabelita (ABS-CBN 2)
- January 8:
  - Fastbreak (IBC 13)
  - Back to Iskul Bukol (IBC 13)
  - Wow! (IBC 13)
- February 18: IBC Balita Ngayon (IBC 13)
- March 17: Comedy Central Market (GMA 7)
- March 27: Liwanag ng Hatinggabi (GMA 7)
- March 31:
  - Sky Ranger Gavan (ABC 5)
  - Janperson (ABC 5)
- April 2:
  - Ooops! (GMA 7)
  - Super Klenk (GMA 7)
- April 5: Dong Puno Live (ABS-CBN 2)
- April 28: TV Patrol Cagayan de Oro (ABS-CBN TV-2 Cagayan de Oro)
- May 29: Tago Ka Na! (GMA 7)
- June 10: Tarajing Potpot (ABS-CBN 2)
- June 30:
  - Arangkada Ulat sa Tanghali (RPN 9)
  - TV Patrol Cebu (ABS-CBN TV-3 Cebu)
  - RPN NewsWatch Primetime Edition (RPN 9)
  - RPN NewsWatch Prime Cast (RPN 9)
- July 26: Compañero y Compañera (GMA 7)
- August 28: Umulan Man o Umaraw (GMA 7)
- September 1: Rosalinda (ABS-CBN 2)
- September 2: Pintados (GMA 7)
- September 10:
  - Bitoy's Adventures in Bilibkaba? (GMA 7)
  - May Himala (GMA 7)
- September 28: May Bukas Pa (IBC 13)
- October 29: Janperson (ABC 5)
- November 3: Alas Dose sa Trese (IBC 13)
- November 10: Labs Ko Si Babe (ABS-CBN 2)
- November 17: Pulso: Aksyon Balita (ABS-CBN 2)
- November 24: TV Patrol Baguio (ABS-CBN TV-3 Baguio)
- November 27: Munting Anghel (GMA 7)
- December 2: Oki Doki Doc (ABS-CBN 2)
- December 17: Family Kuarta o Kahon (RPN 9)
- December 30: Easy Money: Ang Cash ng Bayan (ABC 5)

=== Unknown ===
- Cyberkada on ABS-CBN 2
- Yaiba on ABS-CBN 2
- Bantay Bata, The Series on ABS-CBN 2
- For Kids Only on ABS-CBN 2
- Hour of Truth on ABS-CBN 2
- Jester, the Adventurer on ABS-CBN 2
- Neon Genesis Evangelion on ABS-CBN 2
- Street Fighter II V on ABS-CBN 2
- Super Doll Licca on ABS-CBN 2
- Swiss Family Robinson on ABS-CBN 2
- Wedding Peach on ABS-CBN 2
- Yaiba on ABS-CBN 2
- Koko Kwik Kwak on GMA 7
- Codename: Verano on GMA 7
- Music Video Features on GMA 7
- TV Shopper on GMA 7
- Pablo the Little Red Fox on GMA 7
- Ranma ½ on GMA 7
- Ultraman Dyna on GMA 7
- Ultraman Tiga on GMA 7
- Bodies and Motion on ABC 5
- Health Central with Rachel del Mar on ABC 5
- Kontak 5 on ABC 5
- Paraiso on ABC 5
- Skin Deep on ABC 5
- Video Hot Tracks on ABC 5
- Viva Main Event on ABC 5
- Asian PGA Tour on IBC 13
- ATP Tennis Magazine on IBC 13
- Dear Heart on IBC 13
- Elorde sa Trese on IBC 13
- Gillette World of Sports on IBC 13
- Jeep ni Erap on IBC 13
- Lingkod Bayan ni Tony Falcon on IBC 13
- Marlboro Tour on IBC 13
- Planet Speed on IBC 13
- Racing World on IBC 13
- Sagupaan Global Cockfights on IBC 13
- Sports Review on IBC 13
- Strictly Dancesport on IBC 13
- Ang Dating Daan on PTV 4
- Jeep ni Erap on PTV 4
- LDS Reunited on PTV 4
- Mikaela on PTV 4
- Nature Trip on PTV 4
- Online Bingo Filipino on PTV 4
- Sine Gusto on PTV 4
- Sultada on PTV 4
- Tapatan: Walang Atrasan Boxing on PTV 4
- Kapag May Katwiran, Ipaglaban Mo! on RPN 9
- Business Class on RPN 9
- Uncle Bob's Children's Show on RPN 9
- Tokshow With Mr. Shooli on RPN 9
- Tipong Pinoy on RPN 9
- Junior Newswatch on RPN 9
- Goggle V on RPN 9
- Kids to Go on RPN 9
- Yan ang Bata on RPN 9
- PBA Classics on Net 25
- Shop at Home on ZOE TV 11
- TV Patrol Zamboanga on ABS-CBN TV-3 Zamboanga
- TV Patrol General Santos on ABS-CBN TV-3 General Santos
- Big Bad Beetleborgs on ABC 5
- Inhumanoids on ABC 5
- The Cape on ABC 5
- Beetle Fighters on RPN 9
- Kaybol: Ang Bagong TV on ABS-CBN 2
- Hang Time on Studio 23

==== Stopped airing ====
Program	Channel	Last airing	Resumed airing	Reason
Digimon Adventure	ABS-CBN	December 1	December 29	Pre-empted by On Trial: A Nation in Crisis.
Digimon Adventure	ABS-CBN	December 29	January 26, 2001	Pre-empted by On Trial: A Nation in Crisis and EDSA Dos.

===== New Millennium Celebration on January 1 =====
- Kapwa Ko Mahal Ko (pre-empted, moved temporarily to GMA's backup cable channel, CGMA)

== Networks ==
=== Launches ===
- January 15 - Disney Channel (Southeast Asia)
- February 6 – Viva TV on IBC 13
- July 1 – The Q Channel (then ACQ-KBN and ACQ-KBN Sonshine; now SMNI)

== Births ==
- February 15 - Angeli Nicole Sanoy, actress
- February 23 - Lexi Gonzales, actress and singer
- February 26 - Alexa Ilacad, actress and singer
- March 1 - Nikki Samonte, actress, singer and model
- March 2 - Bianca Umali, actress and model
- March 9 - Emilio Daez, actor, host and model
- March 12 - Sabrina Man, actress
- March 15 - Aaliyah Benisano, actress
- April 21 - Taki Saito, actress and dancer
- April 23
  - Gillian Vicencio, actress and dancer
  - Fatima Louise Lagueras, singer
- May 4 - Angel Sy, actress
- July 15 - Edward Barber, actor and model
- July 22 - Kaori Oinuma, actress
- August 3 -
  - Kira Balinger, actress
  - Vivoree Esclito, actress and dancer
- August 11 - Nathaniel Britt, actor
- August 21 - Kate Valdez, actress and model
- August 30 - Ralph de Leon, actor, athlete and model
- September 3 - AJ Raval, actress
- September 16 - Therese Malvar, actress
- September 17 - Edray Teodoro, singer and actress
- October 9 - Angelic Guzman, actress
- October 11 - Krishnah Gravidez
- October 26 - Mika Salamanca, actress, vlogger and singer
- November 22 - Ayeesha Cervantes, actress
- December 12 - Ezri Mitra, singer
- December 15 - Lyka Estrella, singer
- December 31 - Gello Marquez, actor, singer, vlogger and model

== Deaths ==
- April 25 – Jun Aristorenas, Filipino actor, director, dancer, producer and writer (born 1933)
- December 4 – Tito Arévalo, Filipino actor and musician (born 1914)

== See also ==
- 2000 in television
