= António Rendas =

His Magnificence António Rendas GCIP
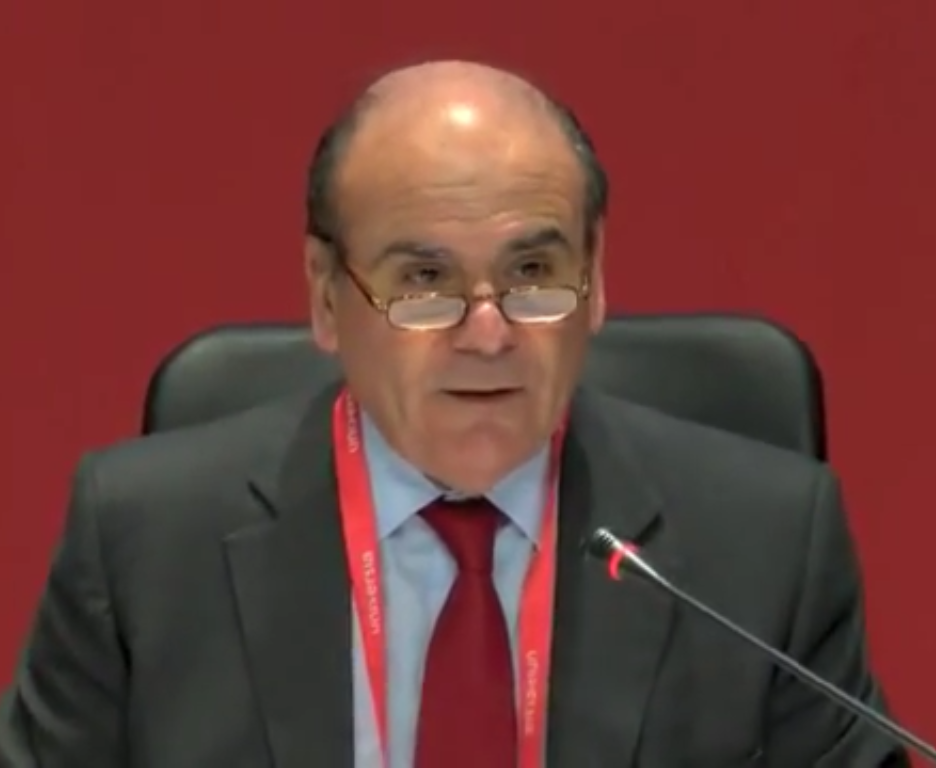
- António Rendas in 2014

Rector of Nova University of Lisbon
- In office 19 January 2007 – 14 September 2017
- Preceded by: Leopoldo Guimarães
- Succeeded by: João Sàágua

President of the Council of Rectors of Portuguese Universities
- In office 9 March 2010 – 11 November 2014
- Preceded by: Fernando Seabra Santos
- Succeeded by: António Cunha

Dean of NOVA Medical School
- In office 1996–2006
- Preceded by: Nuno Cordeiro Ferreira
- Succeeded by: José Caldas de Almeida

Personal details
- Born: 19 April 1949 (age 77) Lisbon, Portugal
- Education: Faculty of Medicine, University of Lisbon
- Occupation: Professor, researcher, and author

António Manuel Bensabat Rendas, GCIP (born 19 April 1949) is a Portuguese professor of Medicine, and a researcher in the field of respiratory diseases. He served as Rector of NOVA University of Lisbon from 2007 to 2017, when he was succeeded by João Sáàgua. He was President of the Council of Rectors of Portuguese Universities (Conselho de Reitores das Universidades Portuguesas, CRUP) between 2010 and 2014. He is currently Academic Holder of the National Academy of Medicine of Portugal, Member of the Steering Committee of UNICA (Network of Universities from the Capitals of Europe), and member of the Board of Trustees of The Aga Khan University.

== Background ==
António Rendas, born in Lisbon, has a degree from the Faculty of Medicine of Lisbon (1972) and a PhD in the field of Experimental Pathology from the Cardiothoracic Institute, University of London (1977). He was a research fellow at Calouste Gulbenkian Foundation between 1974 and 1976, in the Department of Experimental Pathology of the Brompton Hospital, at the Cardiothoracic Institute, University of London. Later in 1990, António Rendas was a member of the Advisory Council on Scholarships of the Education and Scholarship Services of Calouste Gulbenkian Foundation.

In 1977–78, he was an Associate Pathology Researcher at the Department of Pathology at the Children's Hospital Medical Center at Harvard Medical School.

António Rendas managed the Portuguese Institute of Hygiene and Tropical Medicine (Instituto de Higiene e Medicina Tropical, IHMT) of NOVA University of Lisbon between 1982 and 1986. He was also Director of NOVA Medical School (Faculdade de Ciências Médicas, FCM) from 1996 to 2006, where he has been Professor of Pathophysiology since 1982.

Between 1992 and 1994, António Rendas was Project Coordinator responsible for introducing the method of problem-based learning in medical education in Portugal, in collaboration with the Department of Medical Education of Southern Illinois University School of Medicine, with the support of the Luso-American Development Foundation. Between 1995 and 1997, he also held the position of Vice President of the Portuguese Society of Pulmonology. Between 2005 and 2008, he was Coordinator of the National Council of Teaching and Medical Education of the Portuguese Order of Physicians, a position he held when he was elected Rector of NOVA University of Lisbon in 2007. In this institution, António Rendas has seen his mandate as Rector renewed in 2013 by the General Council.

== International career ==
António Rendas took the first steps in his international career in 1977, when he finished his PhD in the Cardiothoracic Institute, University of London. In the same year, he was an associate researcher at the Harvard Medical School in Boston, United States, and remained in this institution until 1978.

Among the international institutions that he belonged to, the World Health Organization stands out, where he collaborated as a consultant for the areas of medical training and specialized training between 1984 and 1986. He also participated in a project of the same organization for development of materials for health in Mozambique.

Between 1998 and 2006, António Rendas was an elected member of the Council of the International Society for Pathophysiology and Coordinator of the Teaching Commission. And from 2002 to 2006, he was a member of the Executive Council of the Association of Medical Schools in Europe (AMSE). António Rendas was involved in the adaptation of the Bologna Process to the Medicine course in 2004, as a member of the respective Working Group, within the scope of the Higher Council of Science, Technology and Innovation. From 2010 to 2014, he was also a member of the Council of the European University Association.

He is currently member of the Steering Committee of UNICA (Network of Universities from the Capitals of Europe), elected in 2015 to hold the second term.

== Research areas ==
- Respiratory pathology
- Biomedical evaluation of aging
- Physiology and physiopathology of breathing
- Medical education
- Problem-based learning and conceptual maps
- University administration and management indicators

== Published works ==
António Rendas is the author and/or co-author of 138 communications and 76 national and international scientific articles. He is also the author of 2 books and 10 chapters of books. Some highlights are:

- "Adaptações funcionais do organismo humano", Leituras do Homem (pp. 55–68), Almerindo Lessa (ed.). Editora Internacional, Lisbon, 1998.
- "Síndromes dispneizantes infralaríngeas", Manual de Otorrinolaringologia (pp. 104–108), with Mota Carmo M. Bárbara C., Samuel Ruah and Carlos Ruah (ed.), 1999.
- "Adaptações normais e patológicas do organismo humano durante o envelhecimento – ‘Idade Biológica’ versus ‘Idade Cronológica’", Envelhecer Vivendo (pp. 49–55), coordination of A. Mota Pinto, Quarteto, 2001.
- "No âmbito da avaliação das faculdades de medicina", Ensino da Medicina – realidade ibérica (pp 191–197), Bissaya Barreto Foudantion, 2002.
- "Sistema de Indicadores de Gestão 2000 – 2002 – um meio de diagnóstico e intervenção na Faculdade de Ciências Médicas", with Névoa L., NOVA Medical School, 2004.
- "O futuro da saúde em Portugal", Coordination: Calouste Gulbenkian Foundation (pp. 25–32), Companhia das Ideias, 2006.

== Distinctions and awards ==
- Thomé Villar/Boehringer Ingelheim Award of the Portuguese Society of Pulmonology (1995, 1999, 2000, 2001)
- Knight of the National Order of Merit of the French Republic (1987)
- D. Afonso Henriques Medal (1st Class) of the Portuguese Army (2011)
- Gold Medal for distinguished Services from the Portuguese Ministry of Health (2014)
- Personality of the Year award by the Portuguese Lung Foundation (2017)
- Great Cross of the Order of Public Instruction by the President of the Portuguese Republic
