= Casa Pia child sexual abuse scandal =

Portuguese criminal case involving institutional child sexual abuse

- Native name: Processo Casa Pia
- Date: November 23, 2002
- Duration: 1960s-2000s
- Location: Casa Pia, Lisbon, Portugal
- Type: Child sexual abuse scandal
- Cause: Alleged long-term sexual abuse of children at Casa Pia institutions
- Target: Children at Casa Pia orphanages
- Perpetrators: Carlos Silvino, Carlos Cruz, Hugo Marçal, Manuel Abrantes, Ferreira Diniz, Jorge Ritto
- First reporter: Felícia Cabrita (Expresso)
- Participants: 32 alleged victims, over 800 witnesses and experts
- Outcome: Convictions of six individuals on 3 September 2010
- Inquiries: Portuguese Judiciary Police investigation
- Suspects: Paulo Pedroso (case dropped), others
- Convicted: Carlos Silvino, Carlos Cruz, Hugo Marçal, Manuel Abrantes, Ferreira Diniz, Jorge Ritto
- Charges: Paedophilia and related sexual abuse crimes
- Trial: 2004–2010
- Verdict: Guilty (3 September 2010)
- Convictions: Carlos Silvino (18 years), Carlos Cruz (7 years), Hugo Marçal (6 years, 2 months), Manuel Abrantes (5 years, 9 months), Ferreira Diniz (7 years), Jorge Ritto (6 years, 8 months)
- Sentence: Up to 18 years in prison
- Litigation: Paulo Pedroso awarded €100,000 for wrongful detention
- First institutional child sex abuse case taken to court in Portugal

The Casa Pia child sexual abuse scandal was a case of child sexual abuses involving a number of children and employees at Casa Pia, a Portuguese state-run institution for the education and support of poor children and under-age orphans. One employee of the institution, which at the time comprised 10 orphanages and schools caring for 4,600 children, ran a male child prostitution network involving 100 boys. The scandal involved several prominent men, including TV presenter Carlos Cruz, former Casa Pia governor Manuel Abrantes, and former UNESCO ambassador Jorge Ritto. The trial was one of the longest running in Portuguese history, lasting more than five years, with testimony from 32 alleged victims, out of a total of over 800 witnesses and experts.

On 3 September 2010, Carlos Cruz, Carlos Silvino, Hugo Marçal, Manuel Abrantes, Ferreira Diniz and Jorge Ritto were convicted and sentenced to up to eighteen years in prison due to crimes occurring in the late 1990s and early 2000s. This was the first time an institutional sex abuse scandal had been taken to court in Portugal.

== First revelations ==
The Portuguese Judiciary Police (Polícia Judiciária) first accused the caretaker of a Casa Pia state-run children's home in 1981 of raping dozens of children over a period of 30 years, even though some reports of abuse pre-date the 1974 Carnation Revolution. Police accused the perpetrators of supplying children to men from Portugal and other countries, including to some prominent public figures in Portugal. However, these early allegations did not result in any legal action.

== Second revelations ==
The scandal of alleged sexual abuse at the state-run Casa Pia orphanages resurfaced when several former orphanage children came forward with accusations of abuse. The accusations linked some politicians, diplomats, and media celebrities—all of whom were alleged to have conspired in a paedophilia ring that had operated for decades. The scandal broke in September 2002 when the mother of one alleged victim, known as Joel, complained of abuse by staff at a Casa Pia house.

In 2002, Felícia Cabrita was the first journalist to reveal the cases of pedophilia at Casa Pia in a report published in the weekly Expresso, after being alerted to the existence of these cases by a former Casa Pia student, Pedro Namora. She then confirmed the story told by Pedro Namora, a lawyer, with Joel's mother, at which point she had access to a tape in which Carlos Silvino (a.k.a. Bibi, an employee of Casa Pia and a former pupil in the institution) appears to be having "pedophile content" conversations with the young man in question, as well as to documentation provided by the master watchmaker at Casa Pia, Américo Henriques, a teacher who had been denouncing the existence of sexual abuse to the leaders of the institution and to the police since 1975.

Former Casa Pia children came forward to publicly accuse several employees of sexual abuse. The weekly magazine Visão reported that a Portuguese diplomat, Jorge Ritto, was removed from his post as consul in Stuttgart (1969–1971) after German authorities complained to Lisbon about his involvement with an under-age boy in a public park.

Accused were diplomat Jorge Ritto, Carlos Cruz, Carlos Silvino (Bibi), Ferreira Diniz (a physician from Lisbon), Hugo Marçal (a lawyer who represented Carlos Silvino in the early stages of the process) and among other individuals, a marine archaeologist.

Secretary of State for Labor and Training from 1999 to 2001, Paulo Pedroso, who was responsible for the Casa Pia homes, which care for some 4,600 children at 10 centers around Portugal, was suspected of 15 cases of sexual violence against minors, which allegedly took place between 1999 and 2000. His case was also subsequently dropped. In September 2008, a Portuguese court ordered the state to pay 100,000 euros ($140,000) to the ex-minister Paulo Pedroso, on the grounds that he was wrongly detained on paedophilia charges.

The Socialist Party leader at the time, Eduardo Ferro Rodrigues, who was a close personal friend of Paulo Pedroso, offered to undergo police questioning after "he had learned of plans to implicate him in the [Casa Pia] scandal". The weekly paper Expresso published a report on 25 May 2003, from four children who said they saw Ferro Rodrigues at locations where sexual abuse was taking place. The paper said there was no evidence he was personally involved and the Attorney General José Souto de Moura insisted he was not a suspect. Ferro Rodrigues took legal action against those who said they saw him at locations where sexual abuse was taking place. Rodrigues has said, "I want it to be clear: our fight will be serene but determined and it is and will only be directed at those who are responsible for this defamation, whatever their objective is."

The Prime Minister at the time, José Manuel Durão Barroso, whose Social Democratic Party ousted the Socialists in March 2002, promised to bring life and honor back into the Casa Pia children's homes and allow new director Catalina Pestana to reform the institution. As a result, several senior staff of Casa Pia were fired after the 2002 revelations. However, Pestana told parliament and the media, as late as 2007, that there may still be paedophiles in the Casa Pia system. She also criticised the legal changes made after the start of the trial, which she claims were made in order to help those who were present to court. These controversial legal changes were partially reverted just before the sentence in September 2010.

The Casa Pia abuse scandal had the effect of raising public awareness of sexual abuse of children. The number of incidents reported to Portuguese police soared after the scandal has been revealed in 2002.

== Investigation and trial ==
The Casa Pia child sex abuse trial started in 2004. In 2004, as an arguido involved in the trial, Carlos Cruz published a book of personal reflections, Preso 374. The final allegations, formerly scheduled for 20 October 2008 in Lisbon were postponed several times. The country's justice system, often accused of being excruciatingly slow, is believed by some opinion makers such as journalists and Catalina Pestana (former head of Casa Pia), to be vulnerable to external pressures of well-connected personalities and the possibility of corrupting external interference has been considered a real danger, according to those critics. They feared that even if Carlos Silvino (the Casa Pia driver), whose initial trial had been twice postponed, is found guilty, better-connected abusers might go free.

On 3 September 2010, Carlos Cruz (seven years), Carlos Silvino (eighteen years), Hugo Marçal (six years, two months), Manuel Abrantes (five years, nine months), Ferreira Diniz (seven years) and Jorge Ritto (six years, eight months) were convicted on charges of paedophilia and other crimes occurring in the late 1990s and early 2000s. The full ruling, which allegedly runs to nearly 2,000 pages, was due to be released on 8 September 2010. However, it was delayed several times due to a Microsoft Word glitch. On 13 September 2010 the full ruling containing the verdict was released. According to chief prosecutor Miguel Matias, the victims were pleased with the outcome. The court ruling was hailed as a victory by those fighting for Casa Pia children's rights in Portugal, such as Pedro Namora, a former pupil at Casa Pia and later a lawyer who publicly supported the victims, and Catalina Pestana, who was head of Casa Pia during the period when some of the cases were made public in the early 2000s.

== Other later developments ==
In October 2020, the Judicial Police (PJ) arrested 74-year-old businessman António Olmos after complaints of child sexual abuse were made against him. He was brought to court and remanded in custody. The accusations against the German-born Portuguese businessman living in Cascais near the Boca do Inferno and owner of a valuable art collection, allegedly involved child sexual abuse crimes perpetrated across the last 20 years for which he was held in pre-trial detention. António Olmos, a well-known figure in Cascais among the local high society, where he lived in a mansion in an exclusive area, was often seen having lunch with television presenter Carlos Cruz and diplomat Jorge Ritto, who in 2010 were both convicted in the Casa Pia child sexual abuse case in Lisbon.

== See also ==
- Child abuse
- Richard Webster
- Sexual misconduct
