= Quem quer ser milionário? =

Portuguese television quiz show

Quem quer ser milionário? is the Portuguese adaptation of the British game show Who Wants to Be a Millionaire?. Broadcast by RTP1 since its debut on 24 January 2000, the show has aired intermittently in the ensuing decades, with several different hosts.

== Money tree ==
Payout structure
Question number	Question value			
Question number	2000–2001	2003–2005	2008	2013–2015
15	50,000,00000 (€249,398.95)	€250,000		€100,000
14	25,000,00000 (€124,699.47)	€125,000	€100,000	€30,000
13	12,500,00000 (€62,349.74)	€64,000	€50,000	€20,000
12	7,500,00000 (€37,409.84)	€32,000	€25,000	€12,000
11	3,500,00000 (€17,457.93)	€16,000	€12,500	€6,000
10	1,750,00000 (€8,728.96)	€10,000	€7,500	€4,000
9	900,00000 (€4,489.18)	€5,000		€3,000
8	450,00000 (€2,244.59)	€2,500		€2,000
7	225,00000 (€1,122.30)	€1,500		€1,200
6	150,00000 (€748.20)	€750		€700
5	75,00000 (€374.10)	€500		
4	50,00000 (€249.40)	€250		€300
3	25,00000 (€124.70)	€125		€200
2	10,00000 (€49.88)	€50		€100
1	5,00000 (€24.94)	€25		€50
Milestone Top prize

== History ==
The first episode was shown on RTP1, presented by Carlos Cruz and with a jackpot of 50 million Portuguese escudos. The original version of the show ran until April 2001, being later presented by Maria Elisa Domingues and Diogo Infante.

The show returned in September 2003 with Jorge Gabriel as host. He remained in position until 2008, though the show had a hiatus between 2006 and 2007.

From July 2010 to September 2011, and again in 2015, José Carlos Malato presented a Hotseat version of the show titled Quem quer ser milionário? Alta Pressão. In between, from September 2013 to April 2015, a regular version was hosted by Manuela Moura Guedes.

For the show's 20th anniversary, the Hotseat version returned in June 2020, hosted by Filomena Cautela and with a jackpot of €50,000.
