= Maria José Nogueira Pinto =

Portuguese politician

Maria José Nogueira Pinto GCIH

Member of the Assembly of the Republic
- In office 15 October 2009 – 6 July 2011
- Constituency: Lisbon
- In office 27 October 1995 – 24 October 1999
- Constituency: Lisbon

Director of the Lisbon Holy House of Mercy
- In office 1 July 2002 – 23 August 2005
- Preceded by: Gertrudes da Conceição Jorge
- Succeeded by: Rui Cunha
- In office 30 October 1987 – 9 March 1988
- Preceded by: José Damasceno Campos
- Succeeded by: Vítor Melícias

Member of the Lisbon City Council
- In office 9 October 2005 – March 2007

Personal details
- Born: Maria José Pinto da Cunha de Avilez; 23 March 1952 Lisbon, Portugal
- Died: 6 July 2011 (Aged 59) Lisbon, Portugal
- Party: PPD/PSD (2009–2011)
- Other political affiliations: CDS–PP (1995–2007)
- Spouse: Jaime Nogueira Pinto (m. 1972)
- Children: 3, including Teresa Nogueira Pinto
- Relatives: Maria João Avillez (sister); Francisco van Zeller (brother-in-law); Sophia de Mello Breyner Andresen (cousin); Miguel Sousa Tavares (cousin)
- Education: University of Coimbra
- Occupation: Lawyer • Politician
- Awards: Order of Prince Henry (1998)

Maria José Pinto da Cunha de Avilez Nogueira Pinto (23 March 1952 – 6 July 2011) was a Portuguese lawyer and politician. She was a member of the Assembly of the Republic of Portugal, representing the CDS – People's Party and, later, the Social Democratic Party.

== Early life ==
Maria José Pinto da Cunha de Avilez Nogueira Pinto was born into an aristocratic family in the Portuguese capital of Lisbon on 23 March 1952. She married Jaime Nogueira Pinto in January 1972. They were both students at the Faculty of Law of the University of Lisbon but, after the overthrow of the Estado Novo regime in April 1974, she interrupted her studies to accompany her husband to the Portuguese colony of Angola, as he had volunteered to do military service there. As a consequence of the outbreak of the civil war in Angola, and before Portugal could withdraw all of its troops, the couple made their way to South Africa, where they were accommodated in a Red Cross refugee camp. They later travelled to Spain and from there to Brazil. When she finally returned to Lisbon, she completed her degree at the University of Coimbra.

== Early career ==
On graduation, Pinto became a researcher at the Rural Studies Office of the Catholic University of Portugal. In this capacity she worked on the publishing of the book O Direito da Terra (The Law of Land). Subsequently, still at the Catholic University, she collaborated in the production of a Legal Encyclopedia and a Portuguese-Brazilian Encyclopedia. She was then appointed as vice president of the Portuguese Cinema Institute.

== Political career ==
Pinto's political career began in 1992, when he was appointed Undersecretary of State for Culture in the 12th constitutional government, headed by Aníbal Cavaco Silva. However, she resigned a year later. In 1995 she was elected to the Assembly of the Republic as an independent deputy on the list of the CDS – People's Party (CDS-PP), representing Lisbon. In 1996 she formally joined the party. In 1998, after poor election results, the leader of the CDS-PP Manuel Monteiro resigned and Paulo Portas beat Pinto in the ensuing leadership contest. Portas later appointed her as president of the Parliamentary Group of the CDS-PP. However, she did not stand for re-election to the Assembly in 1999. She was elected president of the party's National Council and, in 2005, also became the CDS-PP candidate to be leader to the Lisbon City Council. She did not win but became the councillor with responsibility for social housing, playing an important role in promoting the revitalization of parts of Lisbon.

In March 2007 Pinto entered into conflict with the CDS-PP when Paulo Portas returned to the leadership of the Party. She accused Portas of going against democratically elected bodies of the party. She also accused a CDS-PP deputy of physically assaulting her. In 2009, she was asked to join the list of the liberal-conservative Social Democratic Party (PSD) for the Assembly of the Republic. She was duly elected for the Lisbon constituency and was re-elected in 2011, shortly before her death.

== Other activities ==
In addition to her political activities, she was a representative of Portugal in the Ibero-American Co-operation Secretariat, and sat on the advisory boards of the Calouste Gulbenkian Foundation, the António Quadros Foundation and the Alfredo da Costa maternity hospital in Lisbon. She was a regular columnist for newspapers such as Expresso, Público, A Capital, Diário Económico, SIC Notícias, Diário de Notícias and also broadcast on Rádio Renascença.

Maria José Nogueira Pinto died on 6 July 2011, a victim of pancreatic cancer. She had three children, one boy and two girls.

== Awards and honours ==
- In 1998, Pinto was awarded the Grand Cross of the Order of Prince Henry (Ordem do Infante D. Henrique).
- She was made a member of the Order of Saint Isabel (Ordem da Rainha Santa Isabel).
- In 2012, the Santa Casa da Misericórdia of Lisbon, a Catholic charity, announced that her name would be given to its new Continuous and Palliative Care Unit. Pinto was closely involved with the charity for much of her life.
- In 2014, the Lisbon City Council inaugurated a memorial to Pinto by the sculptor Rui Sanches.
- The Maria José Nogueira Pinto Social Responsibility Prize is awarded annually by the pharmaceutical company, Merck Sharp & Dohme Lda., to the person considered to have made the greatest contribution to "social responsibility" in Portugal.
