= Jorge Ritto =

Portuguese diplomat

Jorge Marques Leitão Ritto
- Born: January 3, 1936 (age 90); Lisbon, Portugal
- Education: Degree in Historical and Philosophical Sciences, University of Lisbon
- Occupation: Diplomat
- Years active: 1961–2002
- Known for: Diplomatic service, UNESCO Ambassador, Casa Pia scandal
- Awards: Order of Prince Henry (1991, revoked 2015)

Jorge Marques Leitão Ritto (born January 3, 1936, Lisbon, Portugal) is a Portuguese diplomat who was formerly known for his career in international diplomacy before being convicted of child sexual abuse and sentenced to prison for six years and eight months in 2010. His diplomatic service spanned several decades, with assignments in various countries and roles in international organizations such as UNESCO and the United Nations.

== Early life ==
Jorge Marques Leitão Ritto was born in 1936 in Lisbon, Portugal. He pursued education at the University of Lisbon, where he earned a degree in Historical and Philosophical Sciences. During his time at the university, Ritto served as an assistant professor in the Faculty of Letters, specializing in philosophy.

== Career ==
Ritto entered the Portuguese diplomatic service in 1961, a career that saw him hold various posts around the world. His assignments included:

- Consul in Canada, Toronto (1962): Ritto began his diplomatic career as a consul in Toronto, representing Portuguese interests in Canada.
- Legation Secretary, Embassy in Kinshasa, Democratic Republic of the Congo (1964): He served as a legation secretary during a period of political instability in the region.
- Consul in Stuttgart, Germany (1969–1971): Ritto’s tenure in Stuttgart was cut short after German authorities raised concerns about his alleged involvement with an underage boy in a public park, leading to his recall to Lisbon. This incident, reported by the Portuguese magazine Visão, marked an early controversy in his career.
- Embassy Adviser, Conference on Security and Cooperation in Europe (CSCE), Geneva (1973–1975): Ritto played a role in the CSCE, a diplomatic effort aimed at easing Cold War tensions in Europe.
- Member of the Portuguese Delegation to the United Nations General Assembly (1975): He represented Portugal in the Special Political Committee during the UN General Assembly.
- Adviser, Permanent Mission of Portugal to UNESCO (1976–1981): Ritto served as an adviser to Portugal’s Permanent Mission to UNESCO in Paris, France. In 1977, he participated in the CSCE meeting in Belgrade. From July 1979, he was appointed chargé d’affaires of the Permanent Mission when Ambassador Maria de Lourdes Pintasilgo was named Prime Minister of Portugal.
- Ambassador to UNESCO (until 2001): Ritto served as Portugal’s Permanent Delegate Representative to UNESCO in Paris. He retired from this position in January 2001, having reached the mandatory retirement age of 65 for Portuguese diplomats serving abroad.

After his retirement, Ritto briefly served as a coordinator for ocean and maritime law matters under the Portuguese Ministry of Foreign Affairs’ Directorate-General for Multilateral Affairs until his formal retirement was recognized in July 2002.

In 1991, Ritto received the Order of Prince Henry from Mário Soares for his services to Portugal as an ambassador in various countries. In 2013, Ritto was convicted for three crimes of a sexual nature and sentenced to six years and eight months in prison. In 2015, he was expelled from the Order due to his conviction in the Casa Pia child sexual abuse scandal.
