= Paulo Pedroso =

Portuguese politician (born 1965)

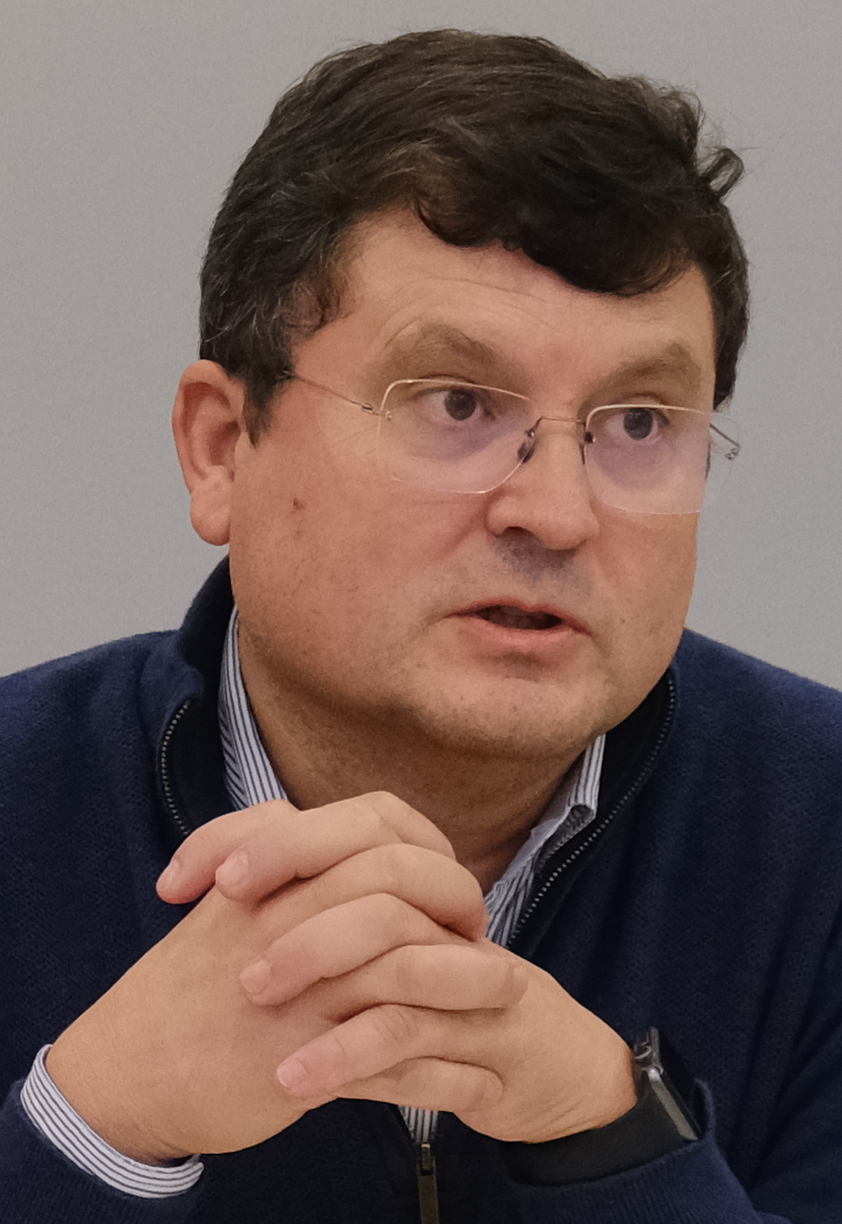
Paulo Pedroso, 2023

Paulo Pedroso (born 28 April 1965 in Aveiro, Portugal) is a Portuguese professor, politician, member of the Portuguese Parliament, and former Secretary of State and Minister for Labor and Training from 1999 to 2001.

Pedroso graduated from ISCTE in Lisbon and became a professor at the same institution. As Secretary of State and Minister for Labor and Training of Portugal from 1999 to 2001, professor, politician and member of the Portuguese Parliament, he promoted a guarantee minimum income policy for unemployed Portuguese in order to combat poverty (Rendimento Mínimo Garantido).

Pedroso was involved in what became known as the Casa Pia child sexual abuse scandal, but the charges against him were dropped. Paulo Pedroso requested a compensation of 600,000 euros from the Portuguese Republic on the grounds that his arrest was illegal and destroyed his political career. In September 2008, a Portuguese court ordered the state to pay 100,000 euros ($140,000) to the ex-minister on the grounds that he was wrongly detained on paedophilia charges. Pedroso returned to the Portuguese Parliament shortly after, as a parliamentary member of his party, Partido Socialista.

In 2018, the European Court of Human Rights (ECHR) condemned the Portuguese State over its treatment of Pedroso, “understanding that at the moment of his arrest there did not exist sufficient proof that (he) had committed crimes of sexual abuse of minors, as related by the youngsters”. The court ordered the Portuguese State to pay around 68,000 euros.
