= Nuno Rogeiro =

Portuguese journalist, pundit, geopolitics expert and professor

- Born: Nuno de Assis Simões Costa Rogeiro; 13 December 1957 (age 68); Portugal
- Education: Lusíada University; University of Lisbon
- Occupation: Journalist

Nuno Rogeiro (born 13 December 1957) is a Portuguese political analyst, pundit, geopolitics expert, and professor.

== Education ==
Rogeiro studied at the secondary school Liceu Pedro Nunes in Lisbon. Subsequently, he graduated in law at the University of Lisbon.

== Career ==
Nuno Rogeiro was an international relations teacher at the Lusíada University in Lisbon. He worked in multiple positions for several Portuguese newspapers like O Dia, A Rua, O Século, and O Diabo. In addition, he wrote for O Independente newspaper and K magazine during the 1990s, and worked for TSF and Rádio Comercial radios. However, it was in television that Nuno Rogeiro reached notability as a geopolitics expert and a commentator in international political and military issues. Nuno Rogeiro started his career on the television, working for Radiotelevisão Portuguesa (RTP) in 1989. During the 1991 Gulf War, Rogeiro appeared on a daily basis to comment the conflict. In 1992, he wrote Política for the collection O que é, published by Quimera. In 2003, with the eruption of the 2003 Iraq War, Nuno Rogeiro was invited by SIC TV channel, a surprise since he had always worked with RTP before then. After the 9/11 attacks in the United States, Nuno Rogeiro wrote O Inimigo Público - Carl Schmitt, Bin Laden e o Terrorismo Pós-Moderno, which was published in 2003. Along with Martim Cabral, Nuno Rogeiro presented the television programme Sociedade das Nações in SIC Notícias. He has been invited for conferences on international affairs worldwide. Rogeiro co-founded the magazine Futuro Presente with Jaime Nogueira Pinto.
