= Análise Social =

Portuguese academic journal

Análise Social (Portuguese: Social Analysis) is a Portuguese peer-reviewed academic journal of social science, published quarterly since 1963 by the Social Sciences Institute of the University of Lisbon. It is the earliest multidisciplinary journal in social sciences in the country. It is specialized in the fields of anthropology, history, political science and sociology. Starting in 2009, it also publishes articles in English.
