= Brites de Almeida =

Legendary Portuguese independence fighter

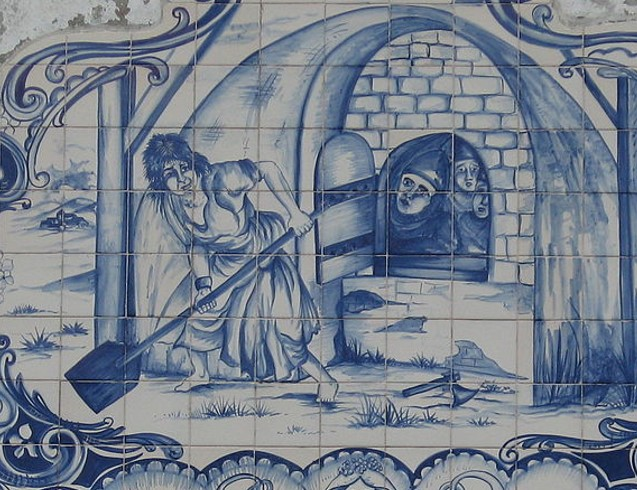
Azulejo tile image of Brites de Almeida killing Castilian soldiers

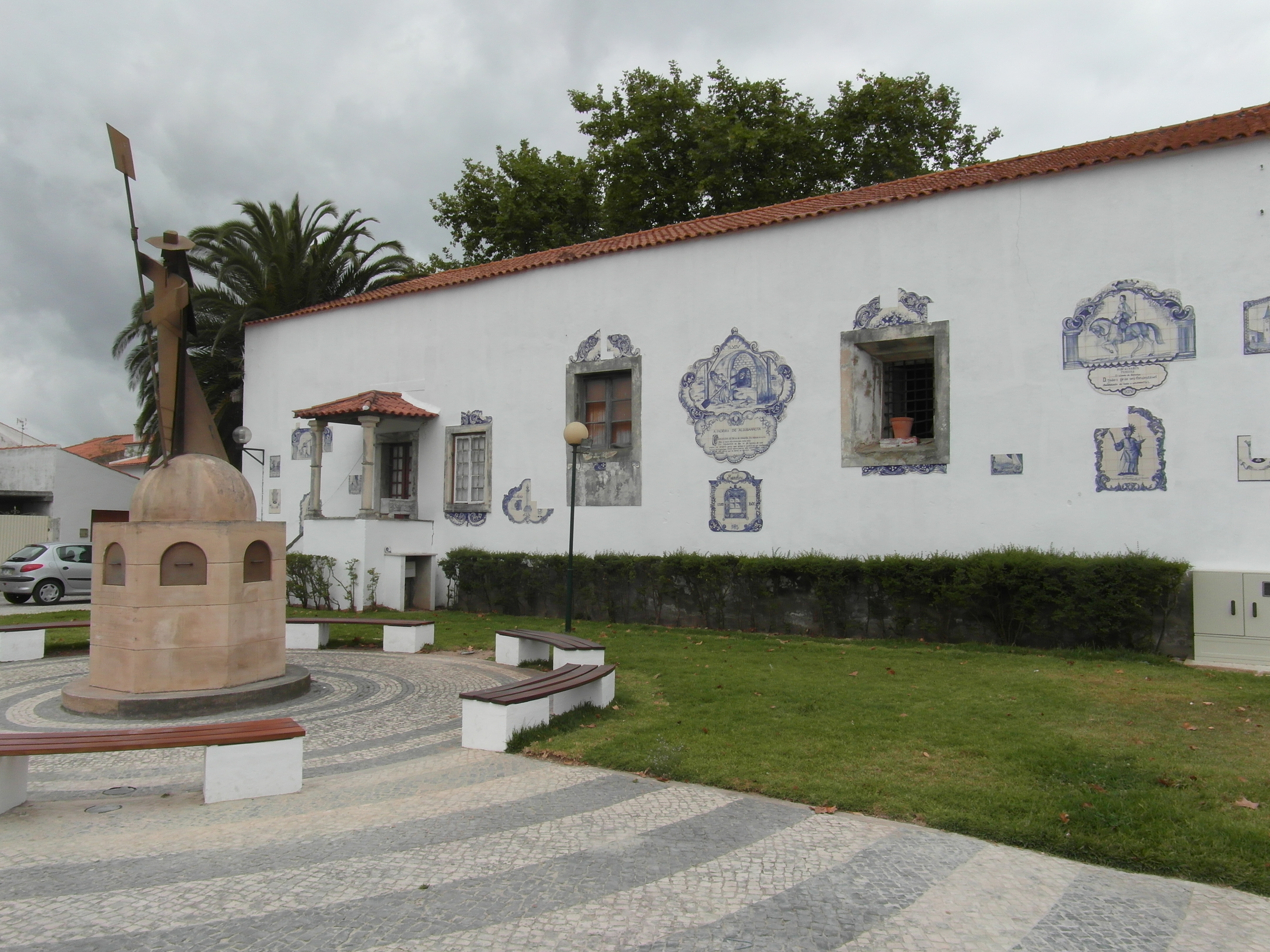
Statue of Brites de Almeida in Aljubarrota

Brites de Almeida, known as the Baker of Aljubarrota (Portuguese: Padeira de Aljubarrota), is a legendary figure and Portuguese heroine whose name is associated with the victory of the Portuguese, against Castilian forces, at the Battle of Aljubarrota in 1385. The battle resulted in a decisive victory for the Portuguese, putting an end to Castilian ambitions to take over the Portuguese throne.

== The legend ==
Brites de Almeida is said to have been born in Faro, Algarve, in 1350, to poor parents. According to the legend she had six fingers on each hand. After both of her parents died, she sold her few possessions and began to travel. There are many stories about her life after she left home in her twenties. One says that she became a muleteer and that she killed a suitor in a fight. Another that she was on a boat attacked by Algerian pirates who sold her as a slave to the Imperial Harem in Algiers, from which she escaped. It is also said that she travelled in Portugal disguised as a man. She ended up settling in Aljubarrota, where she became a bakery owner and married a local farmer. Her bread was supposed to be the best in the country.

After their defeat in the Battle of Aljubarrota, the Castilian soldiers in flight were attacked and killed by the local inhabitants. According to the story, seven or eight of them found shelter at Brites' bakery, which was empty because she had gone out to help to kill the soldiers. On her return she found the door closed and suspected the presence of enemies. She found the men hiding in her baker's oven and killed them with a shovel. She then cooked them in the oven along with the bread.

Although it is undeniable that the story was a legend, Brites de Almeida came to be celebrated by the Portuguese in their songs and traditional stories and her deeds have remained as a symbol of Portugal's independence. She was commemorated in a 1927 Portuguese postage stamp.
