= Jaime Nogueira Pinto =

Portuguese writer and university professor

Jaime Alexandre Nogueira Pinto (born 4 February 1946 in Porto, Santo Ildefonso) is a Portuguese writer and university professor, son of Jaime da Cunha Guimarães and Alda Branca Nogueira Pinto, who died in 2007.

A right-wing political thinker, he has a law degree from the Faculty of Law, University of Lisbon, and is Doctor of Social Sciences, the Institute of Social and Political Sciences, Technical University of Lisbon, where he taught courses in the fields of political science and international relations.

He was director of the magazine Futuro Presente (co-founded with Nuno Rogeiro) and presides over the Luso-African Culture Foundation. Also performs the tasks of consulting and business administration. He has several published works.

Nogueira Pinto married in Lisbon, Campo Grande, on 27 January 1972 with Maria José Pinto da Cunha de Avilez (Maria José Nogueira Pinto, CDS-PP personality and member of the Portuguese parliament), with whom he has three children: Eduardo (b. Lisbon, 4 April 1973, a lawyer, m. Sofia Rocha and Helena Margarida de Ayala Botto (b. 22 February 1979) and had Maria Leonor (b. Lisbon, São Jorge de Arroios, 8 November 2007), Duarte (b. Lisbon, São Jorge de Arroios, 20 December 2009) and Maria Teresa (b. Lisbon, Benfica, 26 July 2012) de Ayala Botto Nogueira Pinto); Maria Catarina (b. Lisbon, 30 April 1976, m. Martim Abecassis de Magalhães do Amaral Neto (b. Lisbon, Benfica, 16 February 1971) and had Aurora (b.Lisbon, 8 July 2006), Jaime (b. Madrid, 11 May 2011)and Joaquim (b. Madrid, 13 May 2015) Nogueira Pinto do Amaral Neto) and Maria Teresa (b. Lisbon, 11 June 1984, m. Tiago Maria Marques de Aguiar Salvação Barreto (b. 6 March 1984) and had Maria Camila (b. Lisbon, 30 December 2009), Francisco José (b. Lisbon, 1 August 2013), and Eduardo Maria (b. Lisbon, 16 June 2016) Nogueira Pinto Salvação Barreto.

In 2007 on the television channel RTP, for the program Os Grandes Portugueses (The Great Portuguese), he was the presenter of statesman António de Oliveira Salazar, winner of the contest.

He is also president of the Board of Directors of the Luso-African Foundation for Culture and a member of the Real Academia de Ciências Morales y Políticas, Le Cercle, Institut d'Études Politiques and Heritage Foundation. He has been highlighted as "the great father of the Portuguese far-right since the end of the Salazar dictatorship."

== Bibliography ==
- O Islão e o Ocidente – A grande discórdia, Dom Quixote, Lisboa, 2015
- Portugal, ascensão e queda – Ideias e políticas de uma nação singular, Dom Quixote, Lisboa, 2013
- Ideologia e Razão de Estado – Uma história do Poder, Civilização, Lisboa, 2013
- Novembro, A Esfera dos Livros, Lisboa, 2012
- Nobre povo – Os anos da República, A Esfera dos Livros, Lisboa, 2010
- Nuno Álvares Pereira, A Esfera dos Livros, Lisboa, 2009
- Jogos Africanos, A Esfera dos Livros, Lisboa, 2008
- António de Oliveira Salazar – O outro retrato, A Esfera dos Livros, Lisboa, 2007.
- Introdução à Política III - com António Marques Bessa Verbo, 2002
- Introdução à Política II - com António Marques Bessa Verbo, 2001
- Introdução à Política I - com António Marques Bessa Verbo, 1999
- Visto da Direita – 20 anos de “Futuro Presente”, Hugin, Lisboa, 2000
- Fim do Estado Novo e as Origens do 25 de Abril, Difel, 1999
- Prefácio de Comunismo e Nazismo, de Alain de Benoist, Hugin Editores, 1999
- A Direita e as Direitas, Difel, Lisboa, 1997
- O 11 de Março – Peças de um processo (com Guilherme Alpoim Calvão), Editorial Futuro Presente, Lisboa, 1995
- Salazar visto pelos seus próximos (Org.), Bertrand Editora, Venda Nova, 1993
- As minhas respostas: Maria de Lurdes Pintassilgo em diálogo com Eduardo Prado Coelho Jaime Nogueira Pinto e João Carlos Espada, Dom Quixote, Lisboa, 1985
- Portugal no Ano 2000 (Org.) – com A. Alçada Baptista, António Barreto, A. Marques Bessa, A. Sousa Franco, J. Borges de Macedo, S. Silvério Marques, F. Lucas Pires, H. Barrilaro Ruas, B. Guedes da Silva, Jacinto Simões –, Intervenção, Braga-Lisboa, 1980
- Portugal – Os Anos do Fim, Sociedade Portuguesa de Economia e Finanças, Lisboa, 1977 (com reedições da Difel em 1997 e 1999, e da Dom Quixote em 2014)
- Ser ou não ser pelo Partido Único (Org António Valdemar) – com Magalhães Godinho, Barrilaro Ruas, Coelho da Silva, Victor Wengorivius, Francisco Pinto Balsemão –, Editorial Arcádia, Lisboa, 1973
- “Polémicas de António Sérgio”, in As Grandes Polémicas Portuguesas, (Direcção literária de Artur Anselmo) II Volume, Verbo, Lisboa, 1967
