= Faculty of Pharmacy, University of Lisbon =

Portuguese medical college

FFULisboa
- Faculty of Pharmacy, University of Lisbon
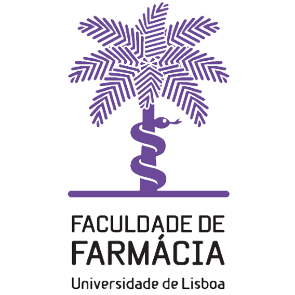
- Motto: “By knowledge, by innovation”
- Type: Public
- Established: 1836
- Location: Lisbon, Portugal
- Campus: University City of Lisbon
- Website: www.ff.ulisboa.pt

The Faculty of Pharmacy, Universidade de Lisboa (FFUL) is a Portuguese public institution of higher education dedicated to education, research, knowledge transfer and continuing education in the fields of pharmacy, medicine, and pharmaceutical sciences.

The FFUL is a recognized institution at the national and international level. The courses that grant an academic degree are accredited by the Agency for Assessment and Accreditation of Higher Education (A3ES) and the Integrated Master in Pharmaceutical Sciences is also accredited by the Portuguese Pharmaceutical Society (Ordem dos Farmacêuticos) for professional practice.

With the motto, "By knowledge, by innovation," the FFUL takes an active role in the dissemination within the field of Pharmaceutical Sciences and further activities addressed to the community regarding public health. Promoting a culture of internationalization, it is associated to many of its academic counterparts and other relevant national and international institutions, in educational and scientific projects, exchange programs and other partnerships.

== History ==
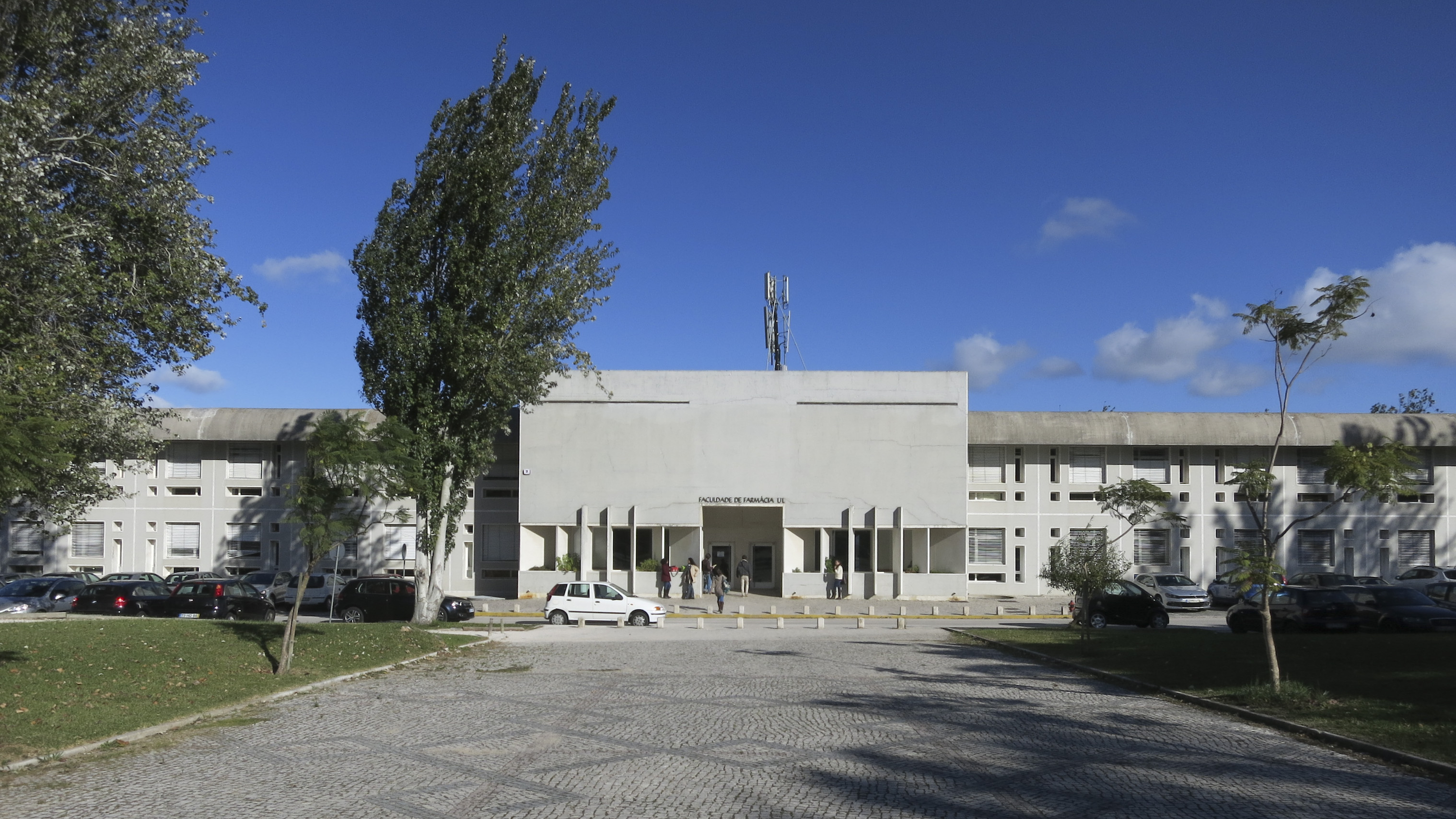
Faculty of Pharmacy, University of Lisbon

The Faculty of Pharmacy of the Universidade de Lisboa was born in 1836 as a School of Pharmacy integrated in the Medical-Surgical School of Lisbon, in which the teaching in the field of pharmacy was assumed by the apothecary of St Joseph's Hospital. With the establishment of the Universidade de Lisboa in March 1911, the School of Pharmacy remained attached to the same institution, now known as the Faculty of Medicine of the Universidade de Lisboa.

By Decree No. 4653 of July 14, 1918, it gained autonomy and was named as the Pharmacy School of the University of Lisbon. It continued, however, to share the facilities of the Faculty of Medicine, in a precarious and inadequate situation. Quinta da Torrinha was bought in 1920 to resolve this situation and to build its own facilities. It would be from this former farm that later the Campus (Cidade Universitária) would be created.

In 1921, by Decree No. 7238 of January 18, the School gets the status of the Faculty of Pharmacy of the University of Lisbon and assigns bachelor and doctoral degrees in pharmacy. In 1932, it was extinguished along with its counterpart of Coimbra, giving way again to a Superior School of Pharmacy, which only granted a bachelor's degree; only in the University of Porto the Faculty of Pharmacy has remained, where were also given the degrees of graduate ("licenciado") and doctor. This would only be reversed in 1968, when it was restored the Pharmacy Faculties of Coimbra and Lisbon, placing them on an equal footing with the Porto academy.

Today, the FFUL teaches various curricular units, some of them in hospital environment. Through these, and project curricular units, students are offered a direct relationship interaction with the pharmaceutical profession as well as with the scientific research that is carried out at the faculty's Research Units.

== Education ==
FFUL provides courses covering all higher education cycles by integrating different areas associated with the professional performance of pharmacists and scientific development in the field of pharmaceutical sciences.

=== Integrated Master in Pharmaceutical Sciences ===
This course enables the Master in pharmaceutical sciences for qualified professional practice, recognized by the Portuguese Pharmaceutical Society, including the following activities:

- Design, discovery, development, manufacturing and usage of human or veterinary medicines and medical devices.
- Research and development in the field of Pharmaceutical Sciences.
- Education programs addressed to the community in the context of health promotion, disease prevention and healthy aging.
- Pharmaceutical practice and pharmaceutical care.
- Biological sample collection, execution and technical and biopathological validation of clinical analysis.
- Toxicology, water and food science.

Course outline:

- Duration: 10 semesters (5 years) | ECTS: 300 - Nine semesters of multidisciplinary training + one semester of internship and public discussion of a monograph. After six semesters the degree of bachelor in Basic Studies of Pharmaceutical Sciences is conferred upon approval of 180 ECTS.

The Integrated Master in Pharmaceutical Sciences of FFUL is accredited by the Agency for Assessment and Accreditation of Higher Education and the Portuguese Pharmaceutical Society, enabling the practice in Europe.

=== Masters ===
- Laboratory Medicine
- Biopharmaceutical Sciences
- Pharmaceutical Engineering (in association with the Instituto Superior Técnico of the University of Lisbon)
- Food Quality and Health
- Medicinal and Biopharmaceutical Chemistry
- Regulation and Evaluation of Medicines and Health Products

=== Doctorate in Pharmacy ===
Supported by several doctoral programmes, such as:

- PhD Programme in Medicines and Pharmaceutical Innovation (i3DU) (in association with the University of Porto)
- Medical Biochemistry and Biophysics Doctoral Programme (M2B-PhD) (in association with the University of Coimbra and the University of Porto)
- PhD Program in Integrative Neuroscience of the University of Lisbon (NeurULisboa)
- Medicinal Chemistry PhD Programme (MedChemTrain) (in association with the Faculty of Sciences, Faculty of Medicine, Faculty of Psychology and Instituto Superior Técnico of the University of Lisbon)
- Doctoral Programme Advanced Integrated Microsystems (AIM) (in association with the Instituto Superior Técnico of the University of Lisbon and Universidade Nova de Lisboa)

== Departments ==
Since 2021, the FFUL includes the following departments in its organizational structure:

- Pharmaceutical Sciences and Medicines
- Pharmacy, Pharmacology and Health Technologies

== Research ==
Scientific research in FFUL is ensured by the Research Institute for Medicines, which integrates more than 200 researchers, focusing its activity in four main areas, the so-called 3DU:

- Discovery of therapeutic targets
- Design of new molecules
- Pharmaceutical development
- Rational use of Medicines

The researchers are in about 15 groups working on basic and translational research in the area of therapeutic innovation. This research institute encourages research across the spectrum of drug development, from laboratory to pre-clinical studies, promoting a response to scientific challenges in emerging areas, such as aging and related diseases, diabetes, cancer, neurodegeneration, osteoarticular degeneration, inflammatory, infectious and metabolic diseases.

The research involves collaborations with various universities, research centers, hospitals, pharmaceutical industry, national and international regulatory agencies in the Medicines area. It has been fostering the realization of scientific projects, financially supported at national and international level. The results and the teams have been internationally recognized and awarded.

In the context of research and teaching, FFUL invests in interdisciplinary partnerships with other Schools of ULisboa in order to develop new cross-cutting areas of knowledge, participating in important networks, such as:

- College “Food, Farming & Forestry (F3)”
- College Mind-Brain
- College of Chemistry
- Tropical College (CTROP)
- AGRO network
- SEA network
- Health network
- VALUE network

== Community Services ==
The FFUL provides to the general public, as well as public and private entities, a number of specialized services that result from the application of translational research performed at the school in the clinical, instrumental and industrial context, including:

- Animal facilities
- Instrumental laboratory
- Clinical biochemistry and microbiology laboratory
- Structural Analysis Laboratory
- The Pharmacovigilance Unit of Setúbal and Santaréml
- Radioisotope Unit

== Awards and Distinctions ==
The FFUL has been awarded in 2013 with the Medal of Honor of the Portuguese Pharmaceutical Society.

== International cooperation ==
To strengthen the internationalization of teaching and scientific research, FFUL cooperates with similar institutions and various agencies and entities in the mobility and training of students, teachers and researchers.

In the context of an international scientific policy, FFUL maintains partnerships with foreign consortiums to attract graduate students and get competitive funding.

Strategic cooperation encourages the development, innovation, internationalization and the attractiveness of the institution with students, teachers and international researchers. The FFUL participates in international programs and integrates international research networks.

- IMI SafeSciMET
- EUDIPharm
- European Association for Cancer Research (EACR)
- European Federation for Pharmaceutical Sciences (EUFEPS)
- European Association of Faculties of Pharmacy (EAFP)
- European Science Foundation (ESF)
- Innovative Medicines Initiative (IMI)
- European Institute of Innovation & Technology (EIT Health)
- Conferencia Iberoamericana de Facultades de Farmacia (COIFFA)

== Personalities associated with the Faculty ==
- Alberto Ralha (1921-2010) - Academic and politician; President of the Portuguese Pharmaceutical Society (1980-1983); Secretary of State for Higher Education.
- Aluísio Marques Leal (1915-2016) - Director of Pharmaceutical Services of the University Hospital of Santa Marta, where he collaborated with the Nobel Laureate Egas Moniz in his research; First Technical Director of Pharmaceutical Services of the Hospital of Santa Maria; Professor of Hospital Pharmacy in FFULisboa.
- Álvaro Teixeira Lopes - Director of the Forensic Science Laboratory of the Polícia Judiciária (2008-2009).
- Ana Paula Martins – President of the Pharmaceutical Society since 2016.
- Beatriz Lima - Academic; President of the Scientific Committee of the Innovative Medicines Initiative (IMI), since 2014; President of the Human Medicinal Products Safety Committee of the European Medicines Agency (EMA) (2001-2012).
- Bruno Sepodes - Chairman of the Committee for Orphan Medicinal Products of the European Medicines Agency (EMA) since 2012.
- Carlos Fernando Costa da Silveira (1923-) – Academic, scientist and navy officer; President of the Portuguese Pharmaceutical Society (1989-1995); National Health Award (2010); Gold Medal of the Order of Pharmacists (2012).
- Elisabete Faria - interim President of the Portuguese Pharmaceutical Society (2008-2009).
- Helder Mota Filipe - President of National Authority of Medicines and Health Products (INFARMED) in 2015.
- João Silveira - President of the Portuguese Pharmaceutical Society (1995-2001).
- José Guimarães Morais – Academic and scientist; Emeritus Professor; Director of FFULisboa (2009-2012); President of the Executive Council of FFULisboa (1996-2009); President of the Medicines Evaluation Committee INFARMED (1992-2009); President of the Portuguese Society of Pharmaceutical Sciences (2005-2011); Gold Medal of the Ministry of Health (2009); Medal of Honor of the Order of Pharmacists (2010); Alumni Distinguished Lifetime Achievement Award from the University of Michigan (2013); Grand Officer of the Order of Public Instruction (2015).
- José de Sousa Martins (1843-1897) - Pharmacist, medical doctor and Professor at the Medical-Surgical School of Lisbon.
- Manuel Rodrigues de Carvalho (1929-1999) - Pharmacist and army officer; Minister of Education and Culture (1974-1975).
- Odette Ferreira (1925-2018) – Academic and scientist in the field of microbiology, identified the type 2 HIV; Chevalier de l'Ordre des Palmes Académiques (1975); Chevalier de l'Ordre national de la Légion d'honneur (1987); Commander of the Military Order of Saint James of the Sword (1988); Medal of Honor of the Portuguese Pharmaceutical Society (1989); Medal of Honor of the Complutense University of Madrid (1995); Prize Universidade de Lisboa (2006).
- Pedro Augusto Franco (1833-1902) - Pharmacist; 1st Earl of Restelo; Peer of the realm; Mayor of Belém; Councillor and Mayor of Lisbon (1894-1897 and 1899–1901).
- Rogerio Gaspar - Vice-Rector of ULisboa (2013-2016); President of the Portuguese Society of Pharmaceutical Sciences, since 2016; Academic Foreign Correspondent of the Royal National Academy of Pharmacy Spain since 2016.
- Rui Santos Ivo - Pharmacist; President of the International Federation of Pharmaceutical Students (IPSF) (1986-1987); President of INFARMED (2002-2005); President of the Central Administration of the Health System (ACSS) (2014-2016).

== Doctors Honoris Causa ==
- James Nicholas Iley (2014) – Senior Lecturer of the Open University, UK.
- Leslie Zachary Benet (2016) – Professor at the University of California, San Francisco, United States.
- Marinus Durand (2005) – Professor at the Universiteit van Amsterdam, Netherlands.
- Michael Drummond (2015) – Professor at the University of York, England.
- Sir Richard John Roberts (2012) – Nobel Prize in Physiology or Medicine 1993.
