= Maria Elisa =

Portuguese journalist and presenter

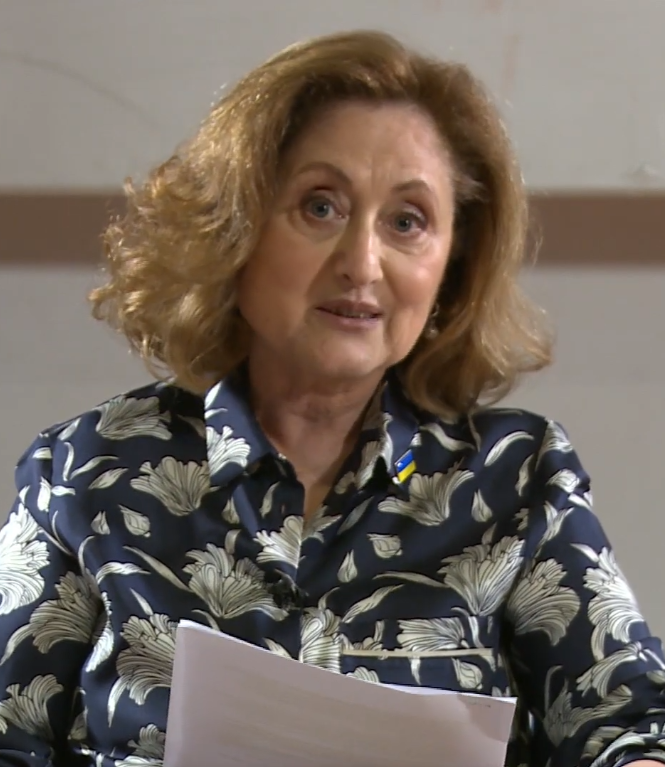
- Maria Elisa in 2022

Member of the Assembly of the Republic
- In office 17 March 2002 – 20 February 2005
- Constituency: Castelo Branco

Personal details
- Born: Maria Elisa Rogado Contente Domingues; 4 June 1950 (age 76) Lisbon, Portugal
- Party: Social Democratic Party
- Spouse: Stanford Hartman (m. 2012)
- Children: 1
- Education: University of Lisbon (dropped out)
- Occupation: Journalist • Writer
- Awards: Order of Merit (1987)

Maria Elisa Rogado Contente Domingues Hartman, known as Maria Elisa (born 4 June 1950) is a Portuguese journalist and television presenter.

== Early years ==
Maria Elisa was born in Lisbon, Portugal. After attending the Medical School of the University of Lisbon for two years and the Drama School for another two (1967–1972), she trained as a professional journalist at the Centre de Formation des Journalistes, in Paris (1974–1977).

== Career ==
As a journalist with RTP, the Portuguese Public Television, she was the author and hostess of her own political and cultural talk shows since 1977. She received and interviewed most of the Presidents, Prime Ministers and other politicians, writers, painters and many other relevant cultural Portuguese personalities as well as business men and union leaders, among many others. She was the hostess of The Greatest Portuguese, a BBC format (October 2006 to March 2007).

In her life Maria Elisa Domingues had other professional experiences: she was the Press Counselor to Prime Minister Maria de Lourdes Pintasilgo (1979/1980); Program Director of RTP (1980–1983 and 1998–1999); Press Counselor with the Portuguese Embassy in Madrid (1986–1987); Director of Communication of the Calouste Gulbenkian Foundation (1995–1998) and Cultural Counselor with the Portuguese Embassy in London (2004–2006).

Maria Elisa nowadays is the President of Associação dos Jornalistas Europeus (the Portuguese association of European Journalists) and also a regular contributor to some of Portugal's largest newspapers and news magazines, such as Diário de Notícias, Público, Expresso and Visão.

== Honours and decorations ==
She received the Ordem do Mérito from President Mário Soares in 1987.

== Personal life ==
In January 2001, Maria Elisa was diagnosed with fibromyalgia. She is a member of Myos—Associação Nacional Contra a Fibromialgia e Síndrome de Fadiga Crónica (Fibromyalgia and Chronic Fatigue National Association).
