= Hospital de Santa Marta =

- Central Lisbon University Hospital Centre
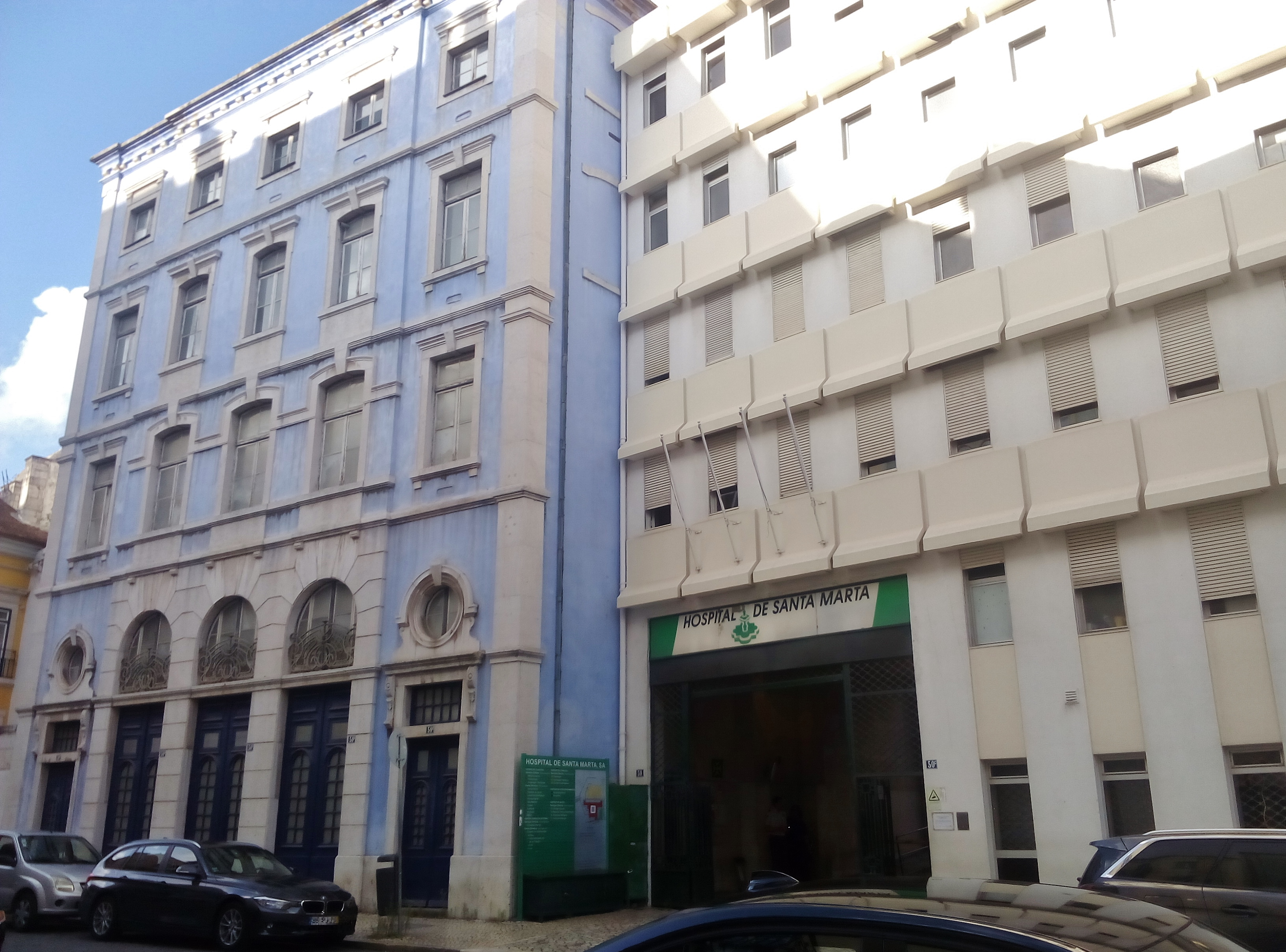

Geography
- Location: Rua de Santa Marta, Santo António, Lisbon, Portugal
- Coordinates: 38.7235°N 9.1456°W

Organisation
- Care system: National Health Service
- Type: Group III (Central Hospital)
- Patron: St Martha of Bethany

Services
- Emergency department: No

History
- Founded: 1890 (136 years ago)

Links
- Website: www.chlc.min-saude.pt/hospital-santa-marta/
- Lists: Hospitals in Portugal

Hospital de Santa Marta (European Portuguese pronunciation: [ɔʃpiˈtal dɨ ˈsɐ̃tɐ ˈmaɾtɐ]; "Saint Martha's Hospital") is a public Central Hospital serving the Greater Lisbon area as part of the Central Lisbon University Hospital Centre (CHULC), a state-owned enterprise.

Originally a Poor Clares nunnery, it became one of the country's main schools of Internal Medicine during most of the 20th century; more recently, it became especially differentiated in Cardiology and Cardiothoracic Surgery: it is one of the main reference centres on the diagnosis and treatment of cardiovascular disease in Portugal.

== History ==
In 1569, at the request of Father António de Monserrate, the representative of the Jesuits of São Roque, King Sebastian authorised the establishment of an asylum (Recolhimento) for the daughters of the victims of the Great Plague of Lisbon, under the patronage of Saint Martha. Years later, after Cardinal-King Henry had ascended to the throne, the priests of São Roque requested the asylum be converted into a nunnery; on 23 September 1577, Pope Gregory XIII authorises the establishment of the convent, which was to follow the Rule of Saint Clare. Archbishop Jorge de Almeida formally established the convent in 1583: the community's founders were three nuns from the Convent of Saint Clare in Santarém, soon to be joined by other Clares from the Convent of Our Lady of Hope in Lisbon and the Clares of Estremoz.

The pre-existing buildings, sold to the religious community in 1571, were adapted into a church and monastery designed by Nicolau de Frias and António Correia, respectively. The new church was built in the Mannerist style from 1612, and construction finished only in 1636. The impressive collection of 17th and 18th century azulejos that can still today be admired in the Hospital (around the mostly unadultered cloister) date from this time. Notably, in 1693, when Catherine of Braganza, Queen Dowager of England, was living in the adjoining Palace of the Counts of Redondo, she had a tribune opened over the main chapel to attend Mass; the tribune was walled shut when the Queen left to live at Bemposta Palace.

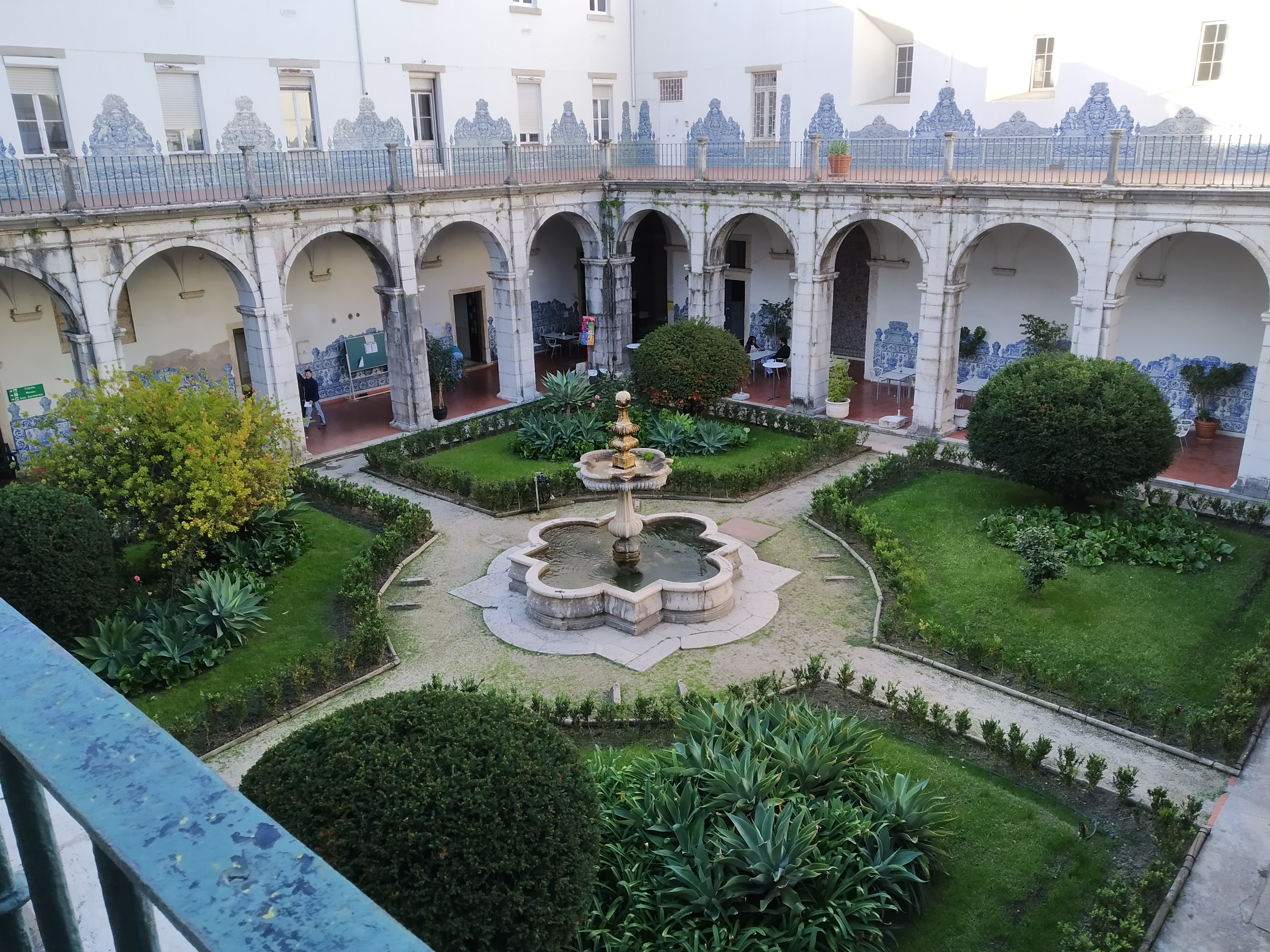
The Mannerist cloister at Saint Martha's

In 1755, the convent suffered great damage during the earthquake that almost totally destroyed Lisbon; the nuns were forced to live in tents outside the building while restoration works were carried out. This notwithstanding, Santa Marta was one of eleven (out of sixty-five) convents that remained inhabitable.

In 1833, following the Portuguese Civil War, the liberal government decreed the dissolution of the monasteries; unlike their male counterparts, female convents (such as Santa Marta) were allowed to remain open until the death of their last nun — which in the case of Santa Marta, happened on 15 December 1887; shortly afterwards, the building and all assets were nationalised.

In 1890, the building was converted into an ad hoc hospital facility in response to a flu epidemic. In 1903, the building was put under the direct responsibility of the Ministry of the Kingdom, and it became part of the city's main hospital centre, then collectively known as "Saint Joseph's Hospital and Annexes" (Hospital de São José e Anexos) and from 1913, called the "Civil Hospitals of Lisbon" (Hospitais Civis de Lisboa, HCL). In 1905–1908, it underwent profound renovation works, overseen by engineer Luís de Melo, to make it suitable as an hospital for venereal diseases: it now had a total of 700 beds, an operating room, a morgue, and an outpatient clinic; fully equipped with a lift and electric light. In 1910, it was renamed "Hintze Ribeiro Hospital", and it became affiliated with the Lisbon Medical-Surgical School; in 1911, following the 5 October 1910 revolution, it was renamed "Lisbon Faculty of Medicine Teaching Hospital" (Hospital Escolar da Faculdade de Medicina de Lisboa"); only in 1922 did it receive administrative and financial autonomy. In 1953, the recently built Saint Mary's Hospital became the city's teaching hospital.

The Hospital was significantly remodeled in the late 1950s, successively expanded with new Cardiology and Cardiothoracic Surgery wards, as well as, in 1971, a new adjoining building housing the outpatient clinic and administrative services.
