= Hospital Curry Cabral =

- Central Lisbon University Hospital Centre
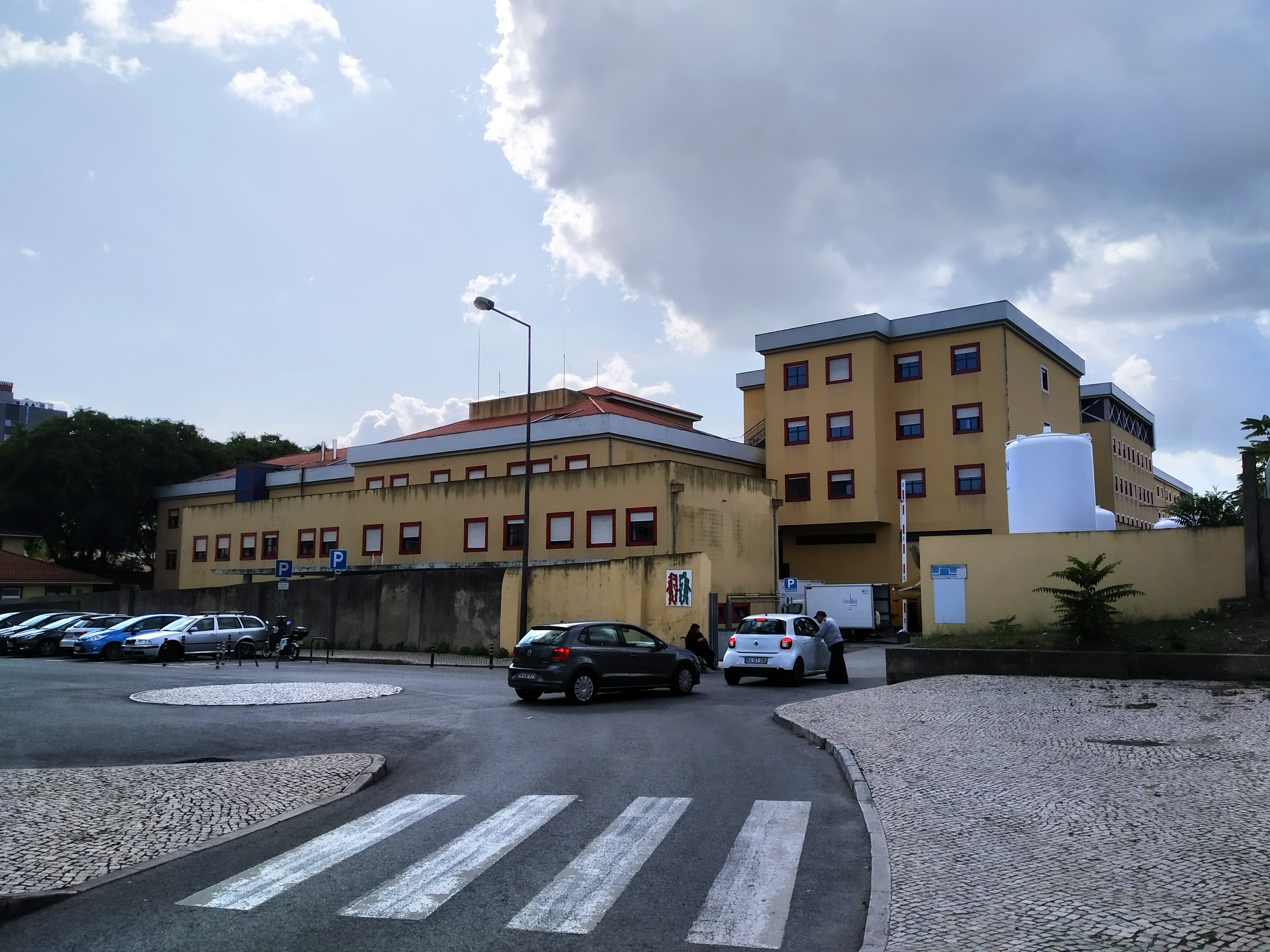
- One of the entrances to Curry Cabral

Geography
- Location: 8, Rua da Beneficência, Avenidas Novas, Lisbon, Portugal
- Coordinates: 38.7400°N 9.1539°W

Organisation
- Care system: National Health Service
- Type: Group III (Central Hospital)
- Patron: José Curry Cabral

Services
- Emergency department: No

History
- Founded: 15 January 1906 (120 years ago)

Links
- Website: www.hccabral.min-saude.pt
- Lists: Hospitals in Portugal

Hospital Curry Cabral (European Portuguese pronunciation: [ɔʃpiˈtal kuˈʁi kɐˈβɾal]; "Curry Cabral Hospital") is a public Central Hospital serving the Greater Lisbon area as part of the Central Lisbon University Hospital Centre (CHULC), a state-owned enterprise.

Originally devised in the early 20th century as a specialised hospital for infectious diseases, Curry Cabral Hospital currently offers many other specialities: it is perhaps best known as the national reference centre on liver transplantation and hepato-bilio-pancreatic diseases, and as the only public physical medicine and rehabilitation inpatient care service in the Lisbon Metropolitan Area.

It is named after José Curry da Câmara Cabral (1844–1920), eminent clinician and medical researcher who was instrumental in the creation of the hospital in 1906.

== History ==
In the early 20th century, there was a need for a specialised hospital in Lisbon dedicated to the care of infectious diseases. Up until the end of the previous century, contagious diseases were treated in the general Saint Joseph's Hospital, until 1892, when the vacant Convent of Our Lady of Nazareth (Convento de Nossa Senhora da Nazaré) in Arroios was repurposed as the Arroios Hospital, an isolation hospital for smallpox and consumptive diseases. However, the old convent was not entirely adequate for the task, and a new specialised hospital was built as a series of 22 modern pavilions holding more than 700 beds. The place chosen for it was a vacant plot of land that had originally belonged to an old Franciscan nunnery, the Convent of Our Lady of Sorrows (Convento de Nossa Senhora das Dores), in the neighbourhood of Rego, in the Avenidas Novas area of Lisbon that was developing at the time as the city expanded north.

The creation of this new hospital was only possible through the personal involvement of Prime Minister Hintze Ribeiro and a substantial grant from Caixa Geral de Depósitos, the largest Portuguese public banking corporation.

Construction concluded in December 1904 and the first patients, transferred from Arroios Hospital, were admitted in January 1906. Rego Hospital (Hospital do Rego), as it was soon after known, was renamed Curry Cabral Hospital in 1929, as a homage to its founder, José Curry da Câmara Cabral, Chief Infirmarer (Enfermeiro-Mor) of the city's general hospital, who had long advocated the establishment of a specialised hospital for communicable diseases.

From its inception, Curry Cabral Hospital became a part of the city's hospital centre, then collectively known as "Saint Joseph's Hospital and Annexes" (Hospital de São José e Anexos) and from 1913, called the "Civil Hospitals of Lisbon" (Hospitais Civis de Lisboa, HCL), nowadays the Central Lisbon University Hospital Centre (Centro Hospitalar Universitário de Lisboa Central, CHULC).

In July 1978, when the Regulation of the Civil Hospitals of Lisbon (Regulamento dos Hospitais Civis de Lisboa) was issued, Curry Cabral Hospital changed its vocation from a specialised hospital for infectious diseases to a general hospital, with administrative autonomy from 1989 onwards. In the late 1990s, the hospital's infrastructure, virtually unchanged since its inception nearly a century prior, was showing signs of obvious deterioration and underwent much-needed modernisation.

In 2019, Curry Cabral Hospital became the first hospital in the National Health Service to be endowed with a robotically assisted surgical system, donated by the Aga Khan Foundation.

In 2020, during the containment phase of the coronavirus pandemic, Curry Cabral Hospital (along with Hospital de Dona Estefânia for pediatric cases in Lisbon, and Hospital de São João in Porto) was one of the three first-line referral hospitals for the diagnosis and treatment of COVID-19; multiple other second-line hospitals were later activated throughout the country, until mitigation phase.
