= Curry Cabral =

Portuguese physician (1844–1920)

Curry Cabral ComSE
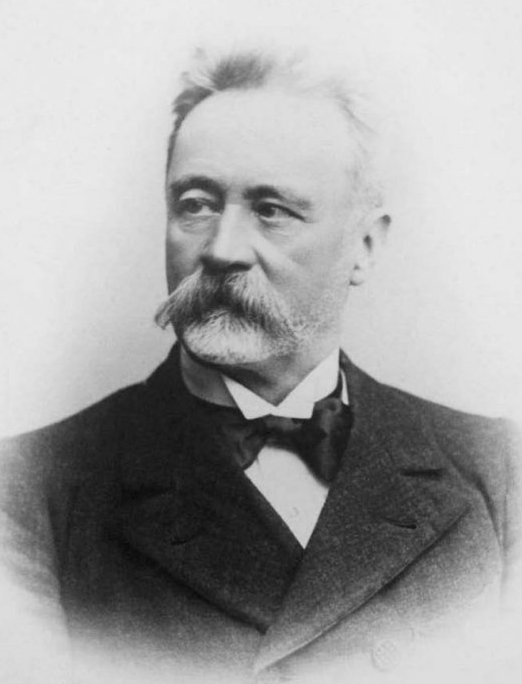

Chief Infirmarer of Saint Joseph's Hospital
- In office 7 January 1901 – 6 October 1910
- Preceded by: José Joaquim da Silva Amado
- Succeeded by: Augusto de Vasconcelos

Personal details
- Born: José Curry da Câmara Cabral; 4 May 1844 São Mamede, Lisbon, Portugal
- Died: 18 May 1920 (aged 76) Lisbon, Portugal
- Occupation: Physician and professor

José Curry da Câmara "Curry" Cabral ComSE (4 May 1844 – 18 May 1920) was a Portuguese physician, and one of the most famous medical researchers and professors in the country. An eminent clinician, he was one of the most prestigious figures in Portuguese medicine in the early 20th century, alongside Sousa Martins, Manuel Bento de Sousa, and Oliveira Feijão.

== Early life and education ==
José Curry da Câmara Cabral was born in São Mamede, Lisbon on 4 May 1844, the son of Alberto Curry da Câmara Cabral and his wife, Mariana Adelaide Runquist Cabral. His paternal family was from Faial Island, in the Azores, and descended from Andrew Curry, a British subject who had settled in the Azores in the 18th century, establishing familial relations with influent local families, namely the Arriagas. Curry Cabral was baptized in the Parish Church of São Mamede, on 16 May 1844.

Curry Cabral lived most of his life in Lisbon, where he enrolled in the city's Medical-Surgical School in 1864. A brilliant student, he defended his thesis on 23 July 1869, titled "As feridas articulares e a cirurgia conservadora" ("Articular injuries and conservative surgery"), which was later published.

== Career ==
Curry Cabral started working at Saint Joseph's Hospital on 7 February 1870, as an emergency room surgeon, promoted on 10 December 1874 to the post of surgeon extraordinary. On 2 July 1885, he was put in charge of an infirmary until he was named the Hospital's Chief Infirmarer (Enfermeiro-Mor) in 1900; he was only dismissed from this post following the 5 October 1910 revolution, to be replaced by Augusto de Vasconcelos. In this leadership post, Curry Cabral staged a reform of the hospital's administrative system, and saw that new inpatient care guidelines were enforced in all the hospitals in the country. Also one of his first preoccupations was the creation of a Division of Medical Statistics, from which we can still today have a glimpse at the casuistry of early 20th-century Lisbon surgeons. In addition to his work at Saint Joseph's, he also worked as a head surgeon at Queen Stephanie's Hospital.

His academic career started with a nomination, on 11 December 1873, to curate the Medical-Surgical School's Museum of Anatomy. He became a professor in 1876, teaching Surgery ("Operatory Medicine") and Anatomical Pathology.

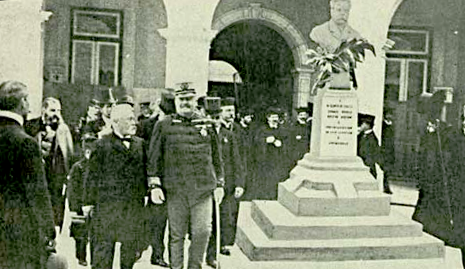
Dr. Curry Cabral standing by King Carlos I of Portugal, during the unveiling of the new building of the Lisbon Medical-Surgical School, in April 1906.

He published several scientific works, and was one of the editors of the weekly medical journal Medicina Contemporânea ("Contemporary Medicine") in 1883. His notoriety as a scientist and professor led to several memberships in national and foreign scientific societies such as the Societé d'Hygiene de Paris and the Lisbon Royal Academy of Sciences. He served as President of the Lisbon Society of Medical Sciences from 1898 to 1900. He was also a member of the country's Superior Council of Public Instruction, an executive of the National Assistance to the Tuberculous, and a member of the Superior Council of Health and Public Hygiene.

He was a great proponent for the establishment of a specialised hospital to treat tuberculosis and other communicable diseases: such an hospital was established in 1906, by Hintze Ribeiro's Regenerator government, in a plot of land that had originally belonged to an old Franciscan nunnery, the Convent of Our Lady of Sorrows. The hospital was at first known as Rego Hospital, named after the neighbourhood where it was located; in 1929 it was renamed Hospital Curry Cabral.

== Honours ==
In 1904, Curry Cabral was made a Commander of the Order of Saint James of the Sword.

== Works ==
In addition to his numerous papers and scientific lectures published in specialised journals, he authored the following works:

- As feridas articulares e a cirurgia conservadora, a proposito de um caso observado na enfermaria de clinica da Escola Medico-Cirurgica de Lisboa (Lisbon: Typ. Universal, 1869)
- Do valor do methodo numerico na medicina em geral, e particularmente na cirurgia (Lisbon: Typ. Universal, 1875)
- Especialidade nas doenças (Lisbon, 1876)
- Discurso recitado na sessão solemne da Escola Medico-Cirurgica de Lisboa (Lisbon: Imp. Nacional, 1877)
- Questão de Peritos: A Medicina Legal no Processo de Joanna Pereira (1878, with Manuel Bento de Sousa and J.T. Sousa Martins)
- Homenagem à memória do professor António Bento Ribeiro Viana (Lisbon: Imp. Nacional, 1894)
- Preliminares do curso de medicina operatoria professado na escola medico-cirurgica de Lisboa (1897-1898) (Lisbon: Typ. do Dia, 1898)
- Elogio histórico do professor Manoel Bento de Souza (Lisbon: Typ. do Dia, 1899)
- A Tuberculose: Assistência Nacional aos Tuberculosos (Lisbon: Typ. do Dia, 1901)
- O Hospital Real de São José e Anexos: desde 7 de Janeiro de 1901 a 5 de Outubro de 1910 (Lisbon: Typ. A Editora, Lda., 1915)

== Distinctions ==
=== National orders ===
- Commander of the Order of Saint James of the Sword (1904)
