= Roman villa of Vilares =

Roman ruins of Vilares
- Interactive map of Roman ruins of Vilares
- 38°43′49.38″N 9°26′37.81″W
- Type: Ruins
- Location: Lisbon, Greater Lisbon, Lisbon, Portugal

Site notes
- Elevation: 93 m (305 ft)
- Length: 21.46 m (70.4 ft)
- Width: 178.46 m (585.5 ft)
- Archaeologists: unknown
- Owner: Portuguese Republic
- Public access: Private Rua de Gil Eanes, Pracete Luís de Camões

The Roman ruins of Vilares (Portuguese: Ruinas romanas de Vilares) is an archaeological excavation in the civil parish of Alcabideche, municipality of Cascais, discovered in the early part of the 21st century on a site designated for residential development. The site identified remnants that implied a necropolis and remains of a Roman villa (imbrices and terra sigillata), but suggested occupation since the Iron Age until Moorish intervention.

== History ==
Although dates are difficult to ascertain, it is likely the area on which these ruins are located were systematically occupied by Iron Age, Roman and Moorish settlements, during their waves of occupation starting in the 1st century.

The first investigation into this area occurred between 2000 and 2001, under the supervision of José d'Encarnação, Guilhereme de Jesus, João Pedro Marcelino Cabral and Maria de Lurdes Nieuwendam.

Between May–August 2007, the archaeological dig continued, with archaeologists accompanying the construction projects, including the digging of channels for sanitation and water pipes. This intervention continued into 2008; while the surrounding terrains were cleared for construction, the site was cleaned and a registry of all the archaeological artifacts was compiled.

Between November 2007 and April 2008, excavations were completed to safeguard the terrains adjacent to the archaeological site, owing to the intended construction of new residential homes in the area.

== Architecture ==
During the excavation the group unearthed vestiges of Roman-era structures including buildings and tombs, as well as vestiges of Islamic silos, which are also discovered from the main site.

Diagnostic analysis was completed in an area of 6 km², revealing numerous and varied remnants. Ten metres from the villa's ruins a group of five structures in dry masonry (60 centimetres thick), that were attributed to the Roman period, and although in ruins, represented two former compartments. Within these spaces the archaeologists unearthed a large concentration of ceramics. Farther to the south of the site, at about a distance of 50 metres, the team also discovered 28 structures, that were associated with Moorish occupation. More than 150 metres south of the villa site, the explorers were able to identify six masonry structures that belong to the Roman era construction, occupying an area of 400 m². In some areas, there were also overturned rocks that could have been a part of the structures already identified.

In its totality, the artifacts unearthed were ceramic, and includes examples of terra sigillata and thin walls. Although a majority of these remnants are difficult to date, some pieces are clearly from the Iron Age (including amphora), Roman occupation and Moorish interventions.
