= Centro Hospitalar Universitário de Lisboa Central =

Central Lisbon University Hospital Centre
- Former name: 1844: Saint Joseph's Hospital and Annexes (Hospital de São José e Anexos); 1913: Civil Hospitals of Lisbon (Hospitais Civis de Lisboa); 2007: Central Lisbon Hospital Centre (Centro Hospitalar de Lisboa Central)
- Established: 1844
- Headquarters: Rua José António Serrano, Arroios, Lisbon
- Hospitals: Hospital de São José, Hospital de Santo António dos Capuchos, Hospital de Dona Estefânia, Hospital de Santa Marta, Hospital Curry Cabral, Maternidade Alfredo da Costa
- Staff: 7,944 (2019)
- Website: www.chlc.min-saude.pt

Centro Hospitalar Universitário de Lisboa Central (pronounced [ˈsẽtɾu ɔʃpitɐˈlaɾ univɨɾsiˈtaɾju ðɨ liʒˈβoɐ sẽˈtɾal]; CHULC; "Central Lisbon University Hospital Centre") is a public hospital centre (a state-owned enterprise) serving the Greater Lisbon area, in Portugal.

CHULC is one of the four hospital centres in Lisbon, alongside Northern Lisbon University Hospital Centre (CHULN), Western Lisbon Hospital Centre (CHLO) and the Lisbon Psychiatric Hospital Centre (CHPL). It groups together the hospitals Hospital de São José, Hospital de Santo António dos Capuchos, Hospital de Dona Estefânia, Hospital de Santa Marta, Hospital Curry Cabral, and Maternidade Alfredo da Costa.

== History ==
The beginnings of the hospital centre go back to 1844 with the establishment of "Saint Joseph's Hospital and Annexes" (Hospital de São José e Anexos), when Hospital de São José annexed the nearby Leper Hospital of Saint Lazarus (Gafaria de São Lázaro); not long after, the Rilhafoles Mental Asylum (some time later renamed Miguel Bombarda Hospital) and the Desterro Hospital also became institutionally attached to São José. Other hospitals in the city merged into the centre along the years (some of them no longer in operation): Hospital de Dona Estefânia in 1877, Hospital de Arroios in 1892, Hospital de Santa Marta in 1903, Hospital Curry Cabral in 1906, Hospital de Santo António dos Capuchos in 1928, and most recently, Maternidade Alfredo da Costa, in 2012. In 1913, the hospital centre became known as the "Civil Hospitals of Lisbon" (Hospitais Civis de Lisboa, HCL), a name by which it is sometimes still colloquially known as.
