= Sara Benoliel =

First female pediatrician in Portugal

- Born: Sara Barchilon Benoliel; 12 April 1898; Borba, Amazonas, Brazil
- Died: 20 December 1970 (aged 72); Lisbon, Portugal
- Occupation: Pediatrician
- Years active: 45
- Known for: Her role in the development of pediatrics in Portugal

Sara Benoliel (1898–1970) was the first female pediatrician in Portugal and was an active feminist. She played an important role in the development of pediatrics and child care in the country at a time when there was high infant mortality. She was responsible for several publications on pediatrics.

== Birth and training ==
Sara Barchilon Benoliel was born on 12 April 1898 in Borba, south of Manaus in the Amazonas state of Brazil. Her family were Sephardi Jews who originally lived in Morocco. At the age of seven, she contracted polio, from which he never fully recovered. This was decisive in her decision to become a pediatrician. At a young age, she moved to Portugal with her family. In 1925, she graduated from the Faculty of Medicine at the University of Lisbon and in the following year received a Doctorate, with a thesis on tuberculous meningitis. She then took courses in pediatrics in Germany, Austria and France. In 1928, she became a naturalized Portuguese citizen.

== Career ==
Benoliel was the first female pediatric doctor in Portugal. Even before she was qualified, she had created a nursery for sick children at the Dona Estefânia hospital in Lisbon. In 1930, she organized free childcare courses for mothers and students in schools, and a year later she founded a Crèche for female personnel in civil hospitals, becoming the director of a model day-care centre at the Hospital de Santo António dos Capuchos, also in Lisbon. In 1935, she was placed in charge of pediatrics at the Faculty of Medicine, having worked there previously as an assistant to Prof. Jaime Salazar de Sousa, who had introduced the speciality of pediatrics to Portugal. She was also a doctor for the Nursery Schools of João de Deus and other hospitals.

== Publications ==
Benoliel published numerous works on childcare and pediatrics, subjects in which Portugal was very backward. At the time there was high infant mortality, and she saw the need to educate mothers and to raise awareness in society as a whole about raising children. Some of her published works include "Some Notes on Maternal and Child Care Abroad" (1927) and "Prejudices in Childcare and the Way to Fight Them" (1935).

== Political involvement ==
She was a member of the Conselho Nacional das Mulheres Portuguesas (National Council of Portuguese Women), a feminist organization that, with the emergence of women's associations supported by the authoritarian Estado Novo government, was closed down in 1947. She was also one of the first women to drive a car in Lisbon, causing a certain amount of scandal. During World War II, she worked with HEHABER, a Jewish youth organization, which played an important role in supporting Jewish refugees who arrived in Portugal.

Sara Benoliel died on 20 December 1970 and is buried in the Jewish Cemetery in Lisbon.
