= Alfredo da Costa =

Alfredo da Costa may refer to:

- Alfredo Bruto da Costa (1938–2016), Portuguese politician
- Alfredo Luís da Costa (1883–1908), Portuguese man who was one of the perpetrators of the Lisbon Regicide in 1908
- Alfredo Nobre da Costa (1923–1996), prime minister of Portugal in 1978
- Maternidade Alfredo da Costa, a maternity hospital in Lisbon, Portugal
