= Maternidade Alfredo da Costa =

- Central Lisbon University Hospital Centre
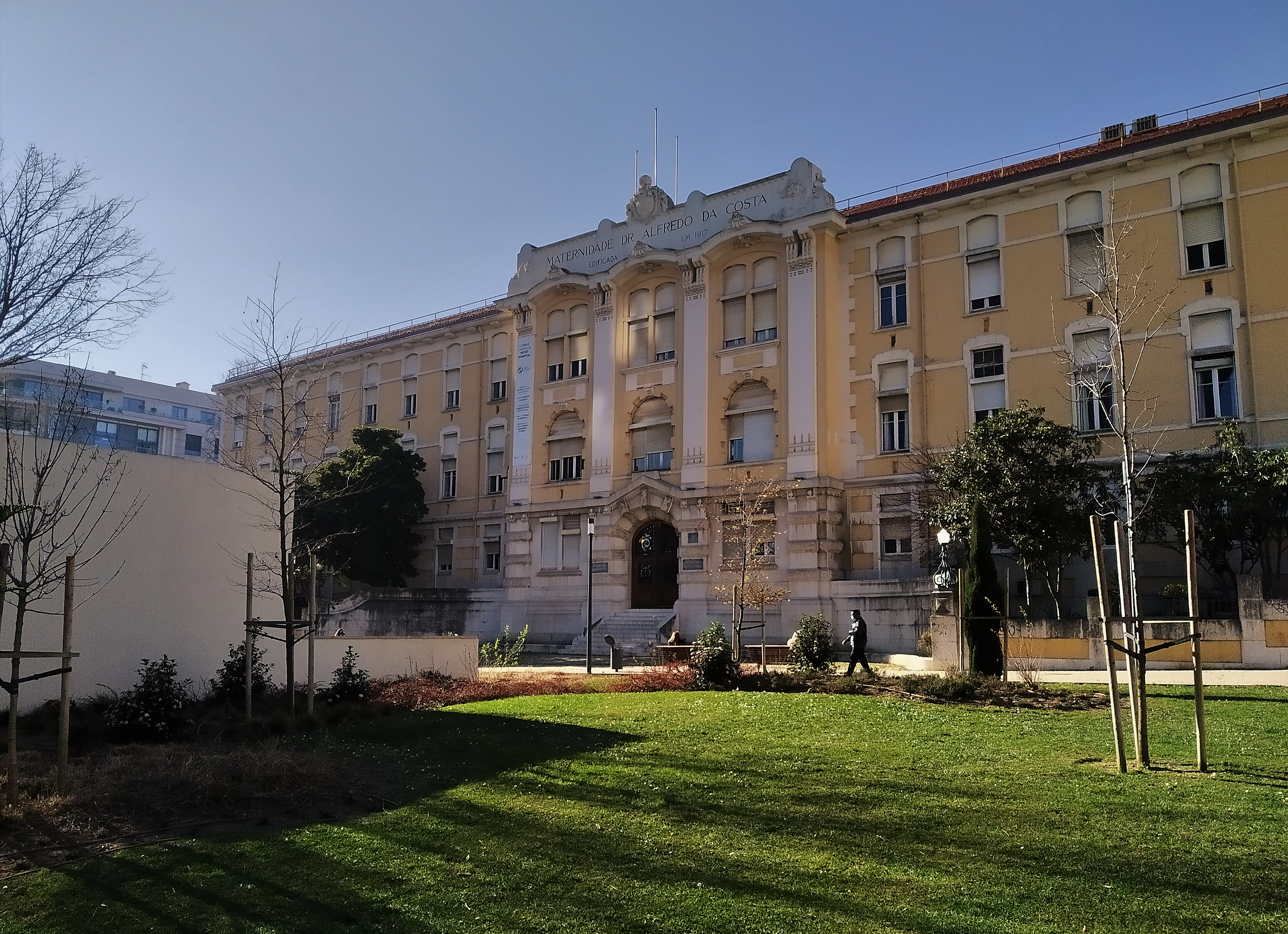

Geography
- Location: Rua Viriato, Avenidas Novas, Lisbon, Portugal
- Coordinates: 38.7324°N 9.1471°W

Organisation
- Care system: National Health Service
- Type: Group III (Central Hospital)
- Patron: Alfredo da Costa

Services
- Emergency department: Yes

History
- Founded: 5 December 1932 (93 years ago)

Links
- Website: www.chlc.min-saude.pt/maternidade-dr-alfredo-da-costa/
- Lists: Hospitals in Portugal

Maternidade Alfredo da Costa (Portuguese pronunciation: [mɐtɨɾniˈdadɨ alˈfɾedu dɐ ˈkɔʃtɐ], "Alfredo da Costa Maternity Hospital") is a public Central Hospital serving the Greater Lisbon area as part of the Central Lisbon University Hospital Centre (CHULC), a state-owned enterprise.

Established in 1932 as a specialised maternity hospital, Alfredo da Costa Maternity Hospital was created to replace the old and increasingly inadequate Enfermaria de Santa Bárbara (Saint Barbara Ward), in Saint Joseph's Hospital, then the only maternity ward in the city. It evolved into a national reference centre in the field of obstetrics and gynaecology, social assistance and scientific research; it remains one of the largest maternity hospitals in the country (3,673 childbirths in 2017).

Construction of the building, designed by Ventura Terra, lasted from 1914 to 1932, and was significantly delayed by the First World War, increased construction costs, and a chronically under-funded budget. It is named after Manuel Vicente Alfredo da Costa (1859–1910), eminent surgeon and pioneering obstetrician who had lobbied for the creation of a maternity hospital in Lisbon since 1898.

On 21 January 1983, Alfredo da Costa Maternity Hospital was made an Honorary Member of the Order of Merit.
