= Healthcare in Portugal =

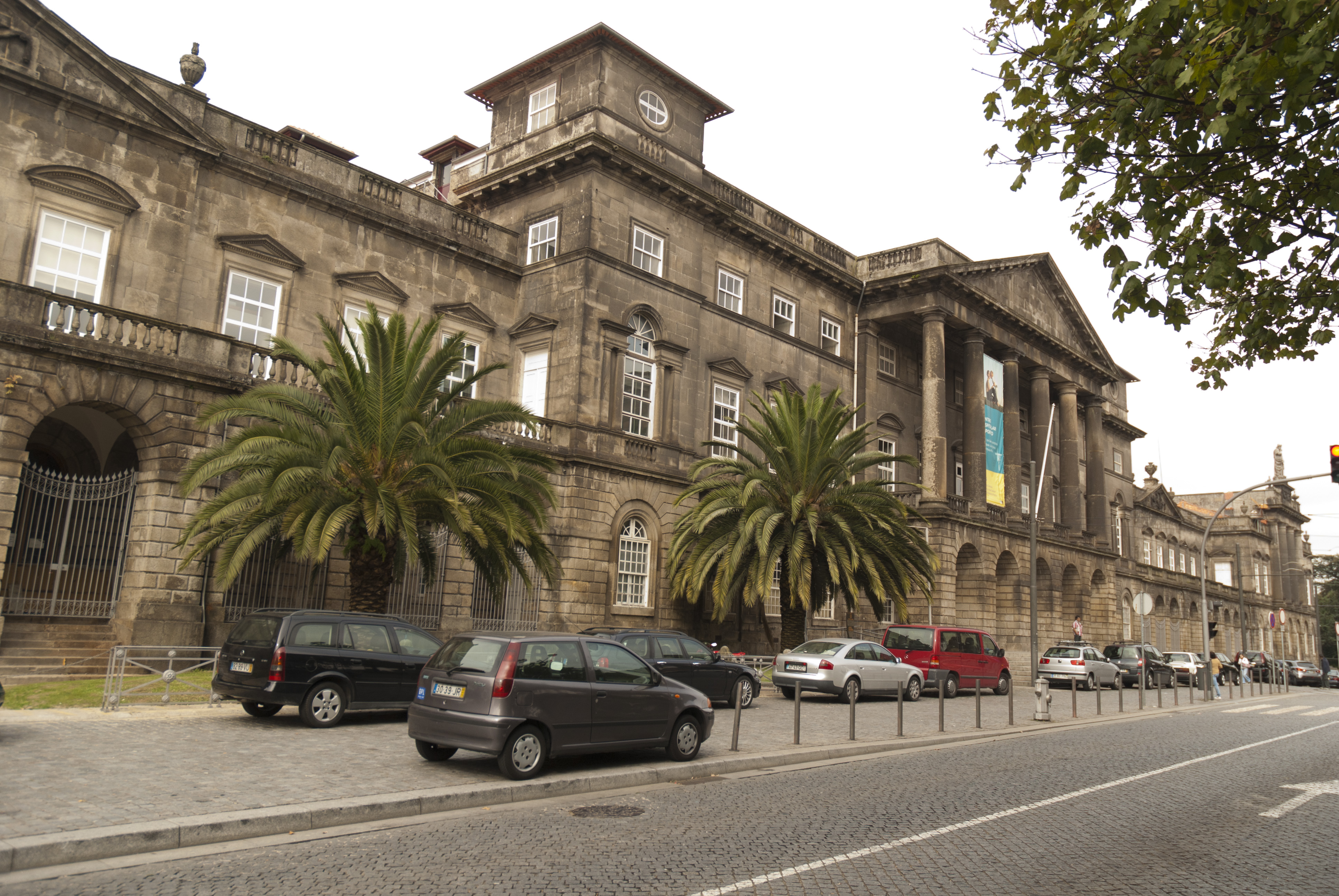
Hospital of Santo António, Porto.

Healthcare in Portugal is provided through three coexisting systems: the National Health Service (Portuguese: Serviço Nacional de Saúde, SNS), special social health insurance schemes for certain professions (health subsystems) and voluntary private health insurance. The SNS provides universal coverage, although in 2012 measures were implemented to ensure the sustainability of the service by the introduction of user fees to be paid for at the end of treatments. In addition, about 25% of the population is covered by the health subsystems, 10% by private insurance schemes and another 7% by mutual funds. The Ministry of Health is responsible for developing health policy as well as managing the SNS. The Health Regulatory Entity (ERS) is the public independent entity responsible for the regulation of the activity of all the public, private and social healthcare providers. In 2019 the government proposes to scrap all fees, which constitute about 2 percent of the SNS's budget, apart from some hospital emergencies.

== Healthcare system ==
=== National Health Service (SNS) ===
SNS logo

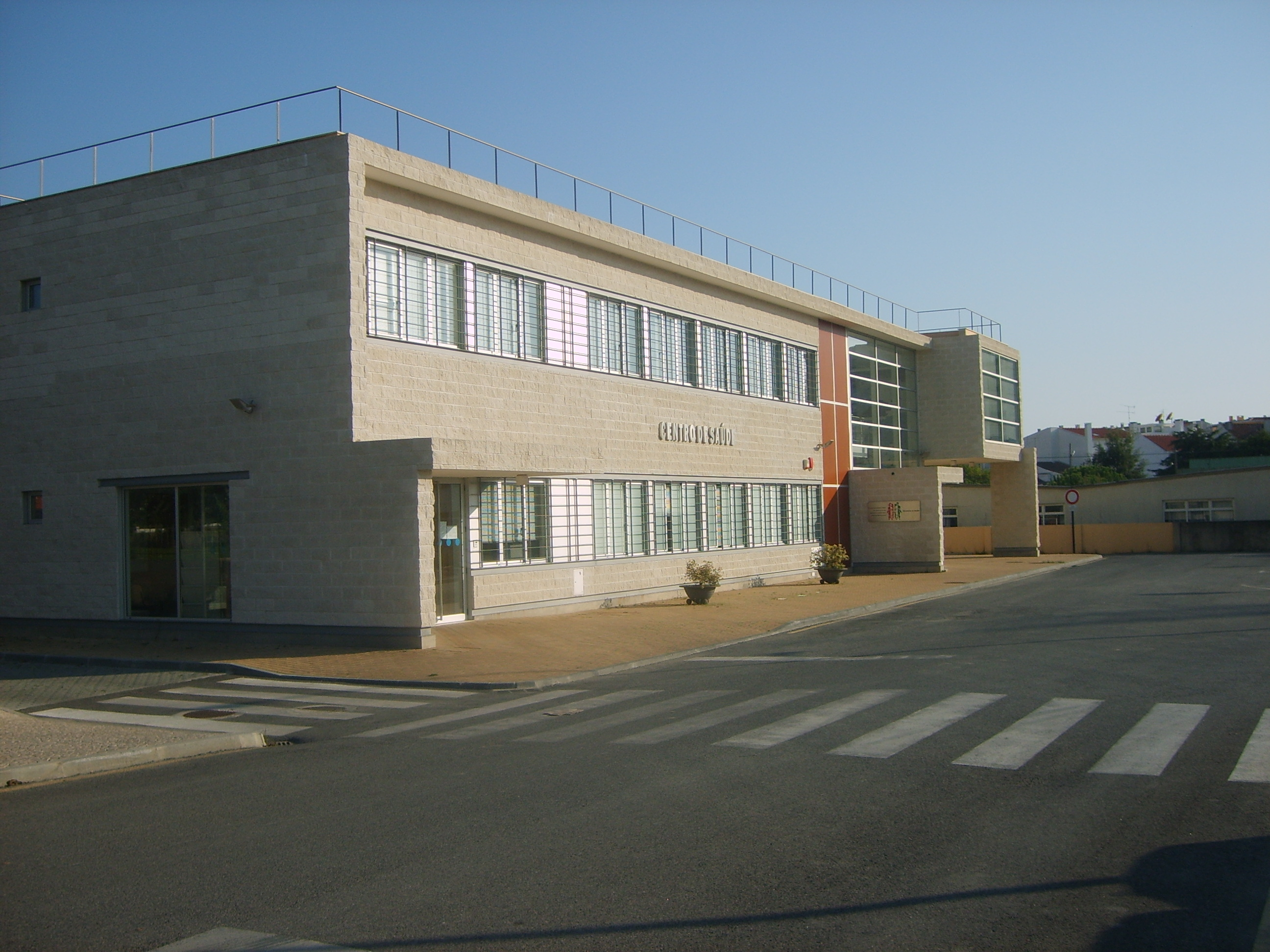
SNS health center, Lourinhã

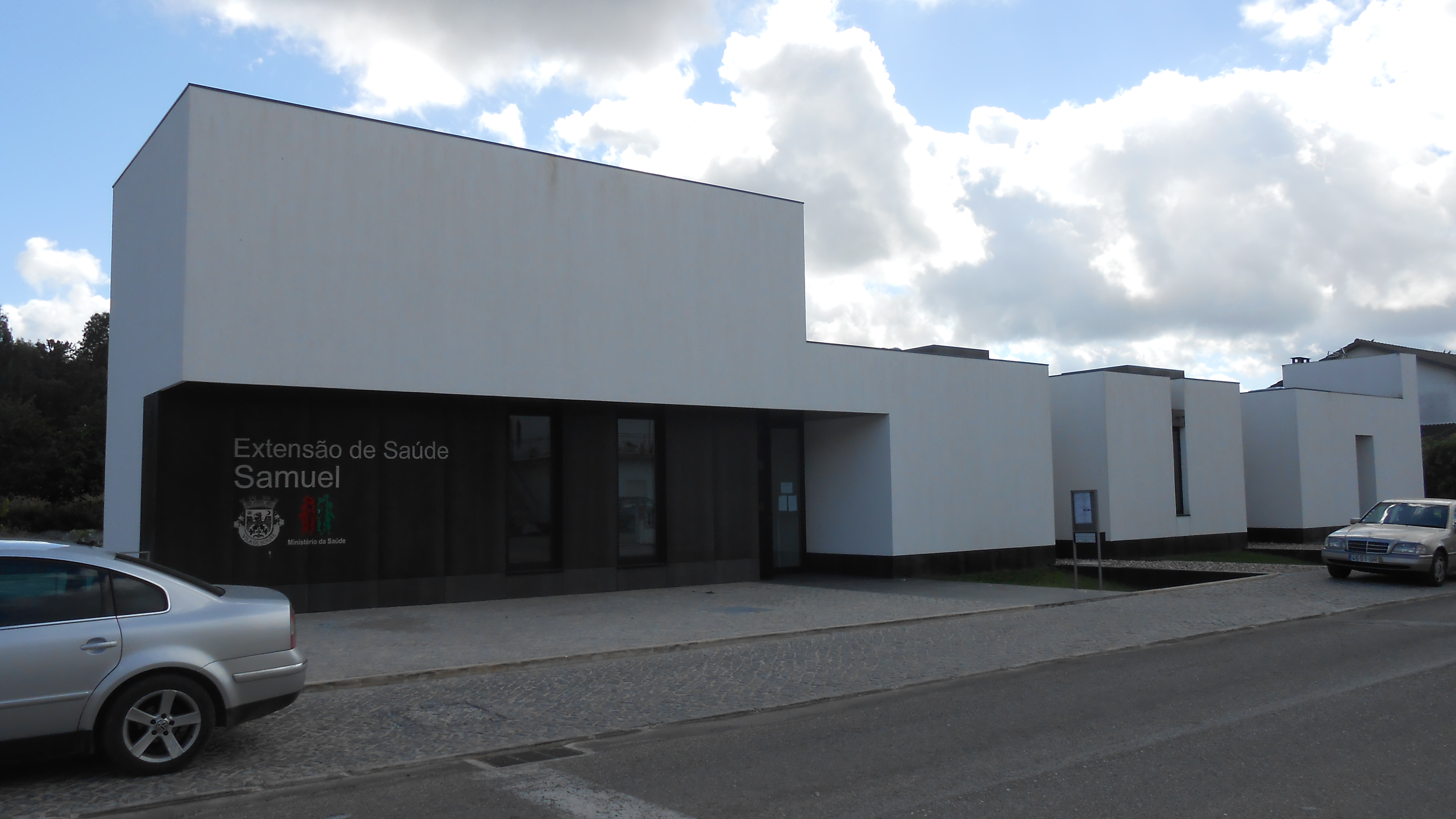
SNS health extension in the village of Samuel, Soure

The National Health Service (SNS) is the system by which the State assures the right to the health protection, in the terms established by the Portuguese Constitution. It was created in 1979 and operates under the supervision of the Ministry of Health.

The SNS is characterized as being national, universal, general and free. It is national as it should be provided nationwide, although presently it still only covers Continental Portugal. It is universal as all Portuguese citizens and foreign residents have access to it. It is general as it encompasses the whole range of healthcare, including the health surveillance and promotion, the disease prevention, the diagnosis and treatment of patients and the social and medical rehabilitation. It is free, as the system is publicly funded, with the health services being tendentiously free of charge for the users. However, some fees are charged, not in order to finance the system but serving mainly to moderate and filter unnecessary access to the services (e.g. to avoid that a person with a minor injury go to the hospital's emergency department instead of going to a local primary health care unit).

The system is managed by the Central Administration of the Health System (ACSS) and by the five regional health administrations (North, Center, Lisbon and Tagus Valley, Alentejo and Algarve). The ACSS is responsible for the central management of the financial, human, equipment and facility resources of the system, as well as for the establishment of health policies, plans, rules and standards. The regional health administrations are responsible for providing the healthcare services to the populations of their respective regions, as well as to execute the national health plan.

Besides being public funded, the health services provided by the SNS are mainly delivered by public health units. These include:

- Health centers groups (agrupamentos de centros de saúde, ACES) - providing mainly primary health care to the local communities. Each ACES congregates several health centers. There is at least one health center covering each municipality, each of which can have one or more extensions in its jurisdiction. The ACES include specialized units of family and personalized healthcare, community healthcare and public health;
- Hospital establishments - providing mainly secondary health care. Most hospitals are now administratively part of a hospital center (centro hospitalar), which groups and manages together several hospital units located in the same city or region. Independent hospitals and hospital centers are classified as group I (general hospitals), II (district hospitals), III (central hospitals) or IV (specialized oncologic, psychiatric or rehabilitation hospitals);
- Local health units (unidades locais de saúde, ULS) - grouping together the health centers and hospitals located in the same city or region in a single comprehensive administrative unit, which is responsible to provide both primary and secondary health care.

The SNS has also conventions with private entities to provide complementary healthcare services to its users.

=== Regional health services ===
Despite the Constitutional and other statutory provisions and being referred as "National", the SNS is not really nationwide, as it was never expanded to the Portuguese autonomous regions, only covering Continental Portugal. In the scope of their devolved powers, the autonomous regions of the Azores and Madeira created their own separate regional health services (serviços regionais de saúde, SRS), managed by the respective regional governments.

The exact status of these regional services and its relation with the SNS is however not clear, as both the Statute of the SNS and the Basic Law of Health are silent about the SRS, with this last one only vaguely mentioning that the health policy in the autonomous regions is defined and executed by the respective bodies of self-government. The question of the status of the SRS was raised when a number of SNS hospitals sued the Regional Government of the Azores to force it to pay the costs of the services provided to residents in the Azores who received treatment in those establishments. The Azorean government argued that the Azores SRS should be considered a regional extension of the SNS, so its users should also have universal access to SNS healthcare free of charges. However, in a decision taken in May 2015, the Supreme Administrative Court considered that the Azores SRS was autonomous regarding the SNS and should be considered a health subsystem, so being obliged to pay SNS for the services provided to its beneficiaries.

The Azores SRS is managed by the regional secretary of Health and is organized in nine island health units (unidades de saúde de ilha, USI), which include 14 health centers, three hospitals and a center of oncology. Each USI groups all the public healthcare establishments located in the same island in a single administrative unit. There are two types of USI. Those that groups both hospital and health centers are similar to the local health units of the SNS, providing both primary and secondary healthcare. USI that groups only health centers are similar to the health centers groups of the SNS and provide only primary healthcare.

The Madeira SRS is managed by the regional secretary of Health. It includes two hospitals, two specialized centers and 15 health centers. All these healthcare units are grouped in a single administrative unit, the SESARAM, EPE (Health Service of the Autonomous Region of Madeira). The SESARAM, EPE is similar to a local health unit of the SNS, providing both primary and secondary healthcare.

=== Health subsystems ===
The health subsystems are the special schemes - parallel to the SNS - responsible for the providing of healthcare to the members of certain professions or organizations. The adhesion to them is mandatory for these groups of persons, with its financing being made either by the beneficiaries or by their employers. There are public and private subsystems, with the first type being responsible for the providing of healthcare to public servants and the second to the members of private organizations.

The most important public health subsystem is the ADSE, which covers all public servants not covered by other special schemes. ADSE has more than 1.3 million beneficiaries, including servants of the central, regional and local public administrations. The other public subsystems cover some special groups of public servants and are the ADM for the military personnel of the Armed Forces, the SAD/GNR for the military personnel of the National Republican Guard, the SAD/PSP for the police personnel of the Public Security Police and SSMJ for some special professional groups (prison guards, Judiciary Police agents, probation officers, etc.) of the Ministry of Justice. All these public subsystems are entirely financed by the State.

The private subsystems are mainly characterized by their occupational basis. They cover either members of certain professions - independently of their employer - or cover the employees of specific private organizations. They can be financed by the beneficiaries - usually through a discount in their salaries - or by their employers. Example of private subsystems are the SAMS for the bank employees, the PT-ACS for the employees of Portugal Telecom and the SSCGD for the employees of Caixa Geral de Depósitos.

The subsystems usually provide the healthcare to their beneficiaries both through public and private medical establishments. This is done by previous conventions agreed between the subsystems and the medical services providers (SNS, SRS or private entities) or - when there are not previous conventions - by the post reimbursement of the beneficiaries for the healthcare payments they advanced. Some subsystems are able to provide directly healthcare services through their own medical establishments. This is the case of the ADM through the Hospital of the Armed Forces and other military health units and is also the case of the SAMS through the SAMS Hospital and SAMS clinics.

=== Health insurances ===
The health insurances complement both the SNS and the health subsystems, with the adherence to them being usually voluntary (although there are some mandatory health insurances). Being considered a healthcare complementary activity, the health insurances are also under the supervision of the Ministry of Health.

The insurances healthcare services are provided to the insured persons through either direct or free schemes. In the direct scheme the services are provided by medical establishments which have a previous convention with the insurance network. In the free scheme, the services are provided by entities with no previous conventions, with the insured person advancing the payment and then being reimbursed by the insurance.

A number of health insurance networks exist in Portugal, with the larger ones being the Multicare (part of Fidelidade insurance group), the AdvanceCare (joint venture of several insurance corporations) and the Medis (part of BCP group).

== Emergency medical services ==
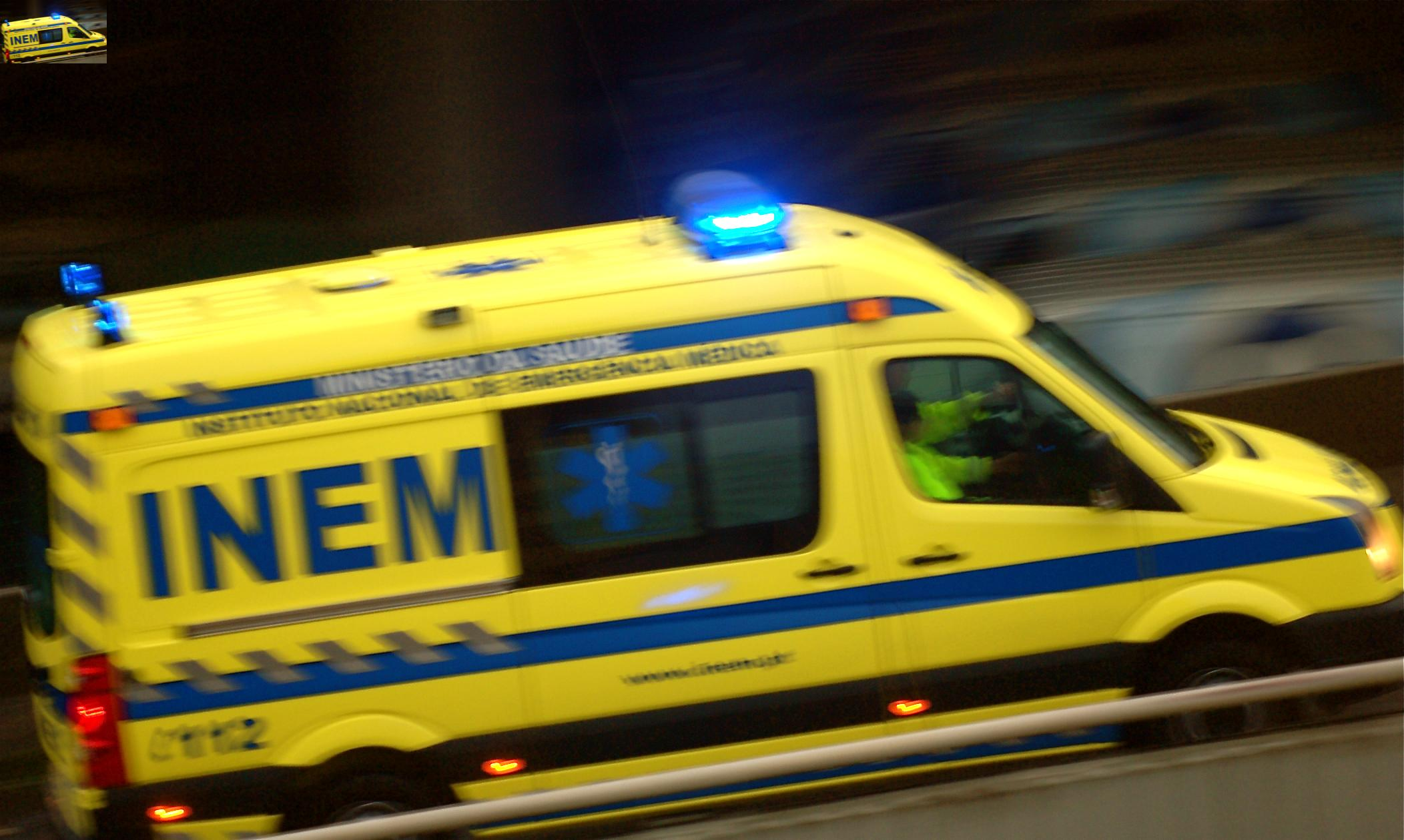
INEM ambulance speeding to respond to a medical emergency.

The Integrated System of Medical Emergency (SIEM) is the main emergency medical service of Portugal, managed by the National Medical Emergency Institute (INEM), an agency of the Ministry of Health. It is activated by the emergency number 1-1-2, under the coordination of four regional urgent patients guidance centers (CODU) and an additional CODU for emergencies at the sea. The SIEM also includes an anti-poison information center (CIAV) and a subsystem for the emergency transportation of high risk newborns to specialized hospital units (TIP).

Under the coordination of the CODU, a number of specialized mobile resources operate, including ambulances, fly cars, air ambulances, motorcycle ambulances and disaster response vehicles. The ambulances are either directly operated by the INEM from its regional branches or are operated from the medical emergency and reserve posts installed in the local fire departments or in the local branches of the Portuguese Red Cross.

The interface between the pre-hospital emergency care and the hospital care is made through three levels of urgency services. The basic emergency services (SUB) deal only with basic medical-only or very simple surgical emergencies. The medical-surgical emergency services (SUMC) deal with medical and also surgical emergencies. The polyvalent emergency services (SUP) deal with the most serious emergencies that need a very differentiated medical and/or surgical treatment. The SUB are installed in the ACES, the SUMC are installed in the hospitals or hospital centers and the SUP are usually installed only in group III hospital establishments.

Although also supporting the Portuguese Atlantic islands with some specialized services, the SIEM covers mainly the territory of Continental Portugal, with the Azores and Madeira having their own separate medical emergency services. In Madeira, the services are provided by the Regional Medical Emergency Service (SEMER), which has features similar to those of the INEM. In the Azores, the medical emergency services are provided by the local fire departments under the coordination of the Regional Civil Protection and Fire Service.

== Hospitals ==
=== Public hospitals ===
The public hospitals are part of the National Health Service (SNS) or of the regional health services (SRS) of the Portuguese Atlantic islands.

Although some hospitals continue to constitute themselves separate administrative hospital establishments, most of the hospital units are now administratively grouped in hospital super-establishments designated "hospital centers" (centros hospitalares). A next phase of hospital administration is being implemented, with the creation of comprehensive health mega-establishments designated "local health units" (unidades de saúde local, ULS). The ULS group not only the hospitals but also the health centers located in the same city or region, integrating the providing of both primary and secondary healthcare in a single administrative unit. Most of the public hospital establishments constitute State-owned enterprises (entidades públicas empresariais, EPE). However, some public hospitals are managed by private entities as public-private partnerships (PPP).

In terms of service, the SNS hospitals, hospital centers and ULS are either classified as group I, II, III or IV (this being subdivided in the IV-a, IV-b and IV-c groups):

- Group I are hospital establishments with an area of direct influence of 75 000 to 500 000 inhabitants, providing the medical and surgical valences of internal medicine, neurology, medical pediatrics, psychiatry, general surgery, orthopedics, anesthesiology, radiology, clinical pathology, hemotherapy and rehabilitation medicine. Group I hospitals can also provide some additional valences like ophthalmology and cardiology, but never provide the valences of medical genetics, allergology, pediatric cardiology, vascular surgery, neurosurgery, plastic surgery, cardiothoracic surgery, maxillofacial surgery, pediatric surgery and neuroradiology;
- Group II hospitals provide the group I valences in their own area of direct influence and also provide the medical and surgical valences of ophthalmology, pneumology, cardiology, rheumatology, gastroenterology, nephrology, clinical hematology, infectiology, medical oncology, neonatology, allergology, gynecology-obstetrics, dermatology-venereology, otorhinolaryngology, urology, vascular surgery, neurosurgery, pathological anatomy, nuclear medicine and neuroradiology in an indirect area of influence. Group II hospitals can also have additional valences, except those of clinical pharmacology, medical genetics, pediatric cardiology, cardiothoracic surgery and pediatric surgery;
- Group III are hospitals that provide all medical and surgical specialties in both direct and indirect areas of influence. The providing of some highly specialized valences like medical genetics, pediatric cardiology, cardiothoracic surgery and pediatric surgery is reserved to group III hospitals;
- Group IV hospitals are those specialized in the areas of oncology (group IV-a), rehabilitation medicine (group IV-b) and psychiatry and mental health (group IV-c).

Below, is the list of the Portuguese public hospitals establishments, divided by the health regions of the SNS (North, Center, Lisbon and Tagus Valley (LVT), Alentejo and the Algarve), the Autonomous Region of the Azores (SRS of Azores) and the Autonomous Region of Madeira (SRS of Madeira):

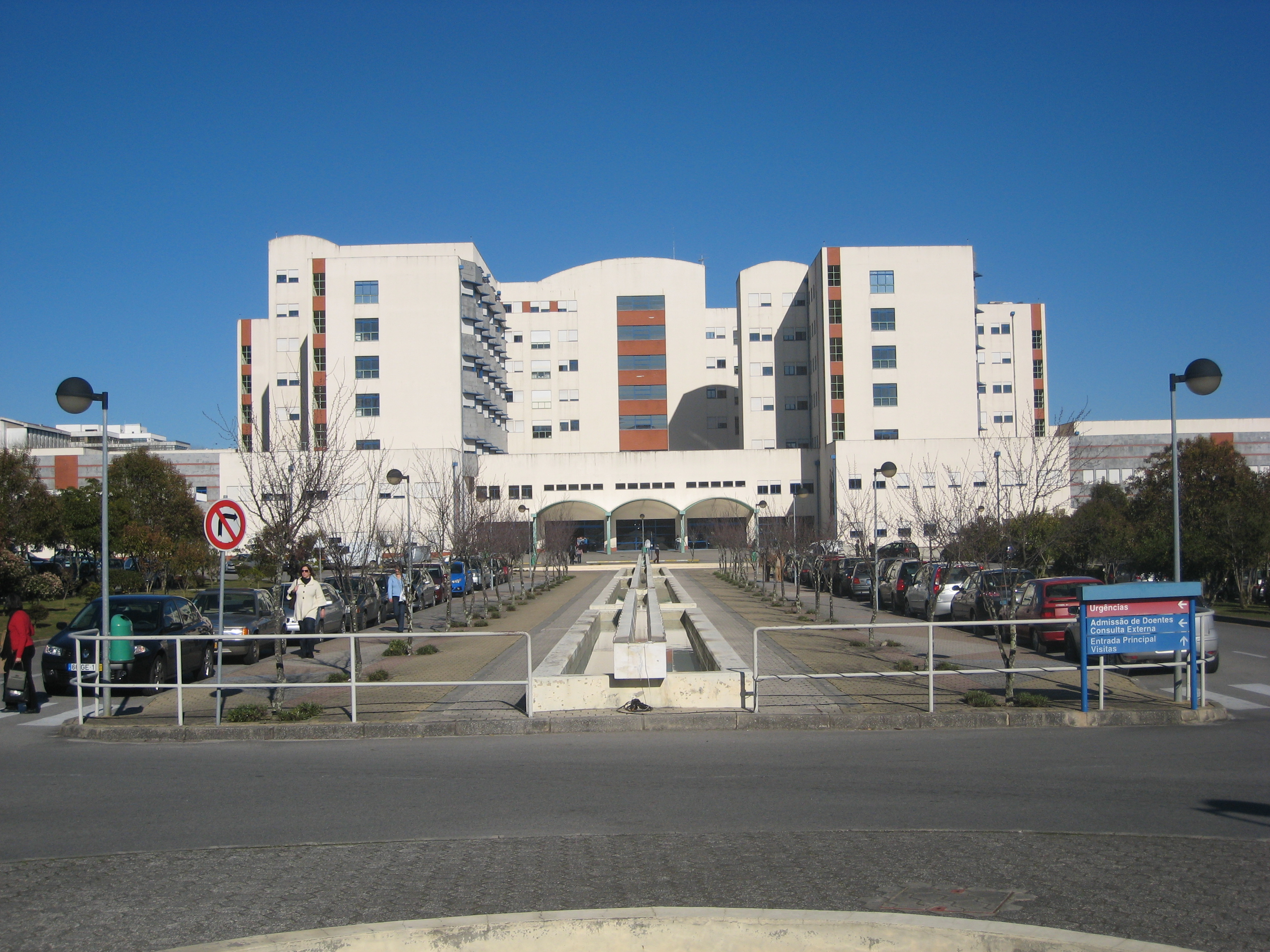
Hospital of São Teotónio, Viseu

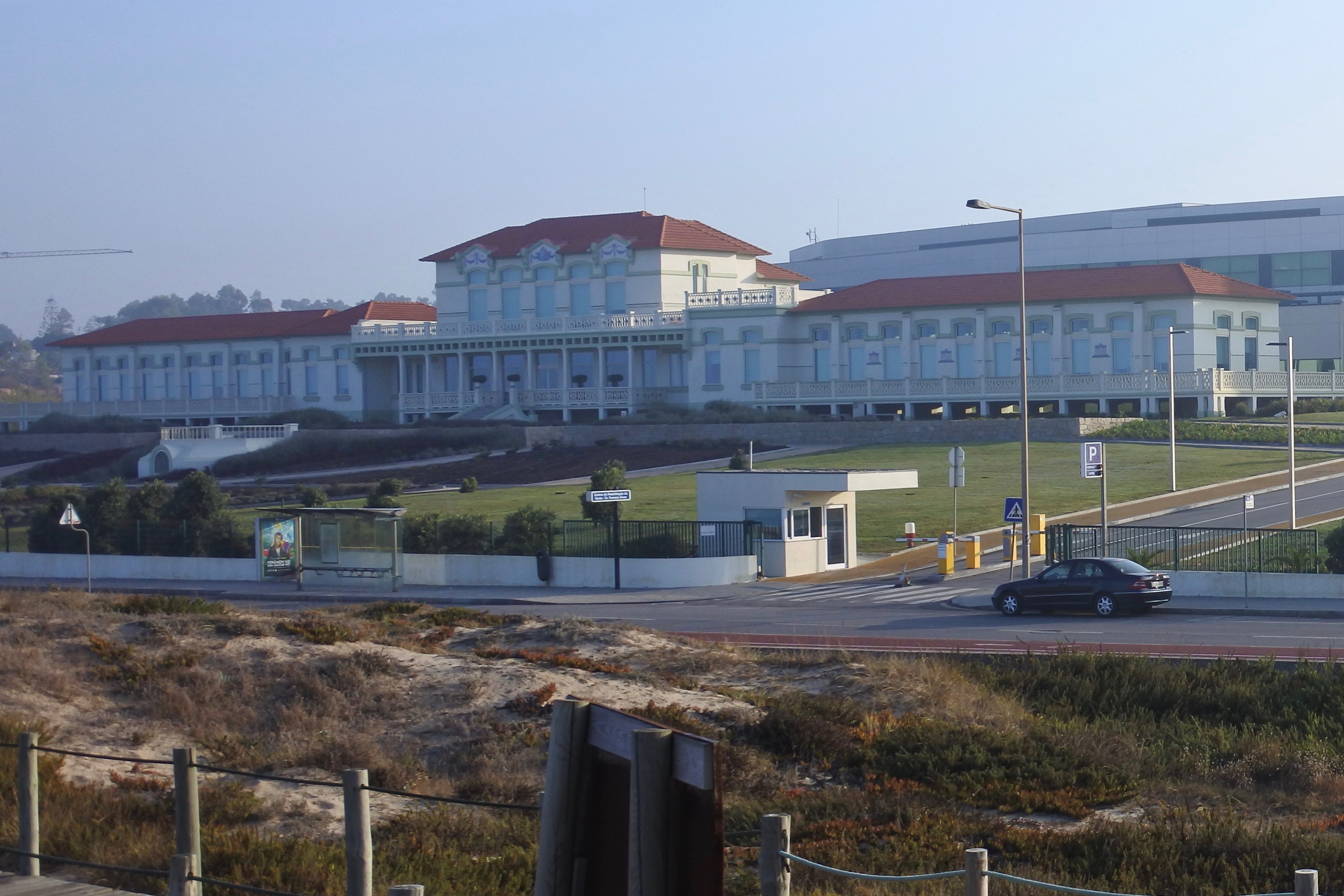
Physical Medicine and Rehabilitation Centre of the North, Valadares

Region	Hospital establishment	Locations / units	Group
Alentejo	ULS do Norte Alentejo, EPE	Portalegre (Hospital de Santa Luzia) and Elvas (Hospital Doutor José Maria Grande)	I
Alentejo	ULS do Baixo Alentejo, EPE	Beja (Hospital José Joaquim Fernandes) and Serpa (Hospital de São Paulo)	I
Alentejo	ULS do Litoral Alentejano, EPE	Santiago do Cacém (Hospital do Litoral Alentejano)	I
Center	Centro Hospitalar Cova da Beira, EPE	Covilhã (Hospital Pêro da Covilhã) and Fundão (Hospital do Fundão)	I
Center	Centro Hospitalar de Leiria, EPE	Leiria (Hospital de Santo André), Pombal (Hospital de Pombal) and Alcobaça (Hospital Bernardino Lopes de Oliveira)	I
Center	Centro Hospitalar do Baixo Vouga	Aveiro (Hospital Infante Dom Pedro), Águeda (Hospital Distrital de Águeda) and Estarreja (Hospital Visconde de Salreu)	I
Center	Hospital Distrital da Figueira da Foz, EPE	Figueira da Foz	I
Center	ULS da Guarda	Guarda (Hospital Sousa Martins) and Seia (Hospital Nossa Senhora da Assunção)	I
Center	ULS de Castelo Branco	Castelo Branco (Hospital Doutor Amato Lusitano)	I
LVT	Centro Hospitalar Barreiro/Montijo, EPE	Barreiro (Hospital de Nossa Senhora do Rosário) and Montijo (Hospital Distrital do Montijo)	I
LVT	Centro Hospitalar de Setúbal	Setúbal (Hospital de São Bernardo and Hospital Ortopédico Sant'Iago do Outão)	I
LVT	Centro Hospitalar do Oeste	Caldas da Rainha (Hospital Distrital das Caldas da Rainha and Hospital Termal das Caldas da Rainha), Torres Vedras (Hospital de Torres Vedras and Hospital Doutor José Maria Antunes Júnior/Hospital do Barro) and Peniche (Hospital São Pedro Gonçalves Telmo)	I
LVT	Centro Hospitalar Médio Tejo	Abrantes (Hospital de Abrantes), Torres Novas (Hospital de Torres Novas) and Tomar (Hopital de Tomar)	I
LVT	Hospital de Cascais, PPP	Cascais	
LVT	Hospital de Loures, PPP	Loures (Hospital Beatriz Ângelo)	I
LVT	Hospital de Vila Franca de Xira, PPP	Vila Franca de Xira	I
LVT	Hospital Distrital de Santarem, EPE	Santarém	I
LVT	Hospital Fernando da Fonseca, EPE	Amadora	I
North	Centro Hospitalar do Alto Ave, EPE	Guimarães (Hospital de Nossa Senhora da Oliveira) and Fafe (Hospital de São José de Fafe)	I
North	Centro Hospitalar do Médio Ave, EPE	Santo Tirso (Hospital Conde de São Bento) and Vila Nova de Famalicão (Hospital São João de Deus)	I
North	Centro Hospitalar Entre Douro e Vouga, EPE	Santa Maria da Feira (Hospital de São Sebastião), São João da Madeira (Hospital Distrital de São João da Madeira) and Oliveira de Azeméis (Hospital de São Miguel)	I
North	Centro Hospitalar Póvoa do Varzim/Vila do Conde, EPE	Póvoa do Varzim (Hospital da Póvoa de Varzim) and Vila do Conde (Hospital de Vila do Conde)	I
North	Centro Hospitalar Tâmega e Sousa, EPE	Penafiel (Hospital Padre Américo) and Amarante (Hospital de São Gonçalo de Amarante)	I
North	Hospital Santa Maria Maior, EPE	Barcelos	I
North	ULS de Matosinhos, EPE	Matosinhos (Hospital Pedro Hispano)	I
North	ULS do Alto Minho, EPE	Viana do Castelo (Hospital de Santa Luzia and Hospital Conde Bertiandos)	I
North	ULS do Nordeste, EPE	Bragança (Hospital Distrital de Bragança), Macedo de Cavaleiros (Hospital de Macedo de Cavaleiros) and Mirandela (Hospital de Mirandela)	I
Alentejo	Hospital do Espírito Santo, EPE	Évora	II
Algarve	Centro Hospitalar do Algarve, EPE	Faro (Hospital Distrital de Faro), Lagos (Hospital de Lagos) and Portimão (Hospital de Portimão)	II
Center	Centro Hospitalar Tondela-Viseu, EPE	Tondela (Hospital Cândido de Figueiredo) and Viseu (Hospital de São Teotónio)	II
LVT	Centro Hospitalar de Lisboa Ocidental, EPE	Lisbon (Hospital Egas Moniz and Hospital de São Francisco Xavier) and Carnaxide (Hospital de Santa Cruz)	II
LVT	Hospital Garcia de Orta, EPE	Almada	II
North	Centro Hospitalar de Trás-os-Montes e Alto Douro, EPE	Peso da Régua (Hospital Dom Luiz I), Vila Real (Hospital de São Pedro de Vila Real), Chaves (Unidade Hospitalar de Chaves / former Hospital de Chaves) and Lamego (Unidade Hospitalar de Lamego / former Hospital Distrital de Lamego)	II
North	Centro Hospitalar Vila Nova de Gaia / Espinho, EPE	Vila Nova de Gaia (Unidade I / former Hospital Eduardo Santos Silva and Unidade II / former Hospital Distrital de Vila Nova de Gaia) and Espinho (Unidade III / former Hospital Nossa Senhora da Ajuda)	II
North	Hospital de Braga, EPE	Braga	II
Center	Centro Hospitalar e Universitário de Coimbra, EPE	Coimbra (Hospitais da Universidade de Coimbra, Hospital Geral dos Covões, Maternidade Bissaya Barreto, Maternidade Dr. Daniel de Matos, Hospital Pediátrico de Coimbra and Centro Hospitalar Psiquiátrico de Coimbra/Unidade Sobral Cid)	III
LVT	Centro Hospitalar de Lisboa Central, EPE	Lisbon (Hospital de São José, Hospital de Santo António dos Capuchos, Hospital de Dona Estefânia, Hospital de Santa Marta, Hospital Curry Cabral, and Maternidade Alfredo da Costa)	III
LVT	Centro Hospitalar de Lisboa Norte, EPE	Lisbon (Hospital de Santa Maria and Hospital Pulido Valente)	III
North	Centro Hospitalar de São João, EPE	Porto (Hospital de São João) and Valongo (Hospital Nossa Senhora da Conceição de Valongo)	III
North	Centro Hospitalar do Porto, EPE	Porto (Hospital Geral de Santo António, Hospital Joaquim Urbano and Maternidade Júlio Dinis)	III
Center	Instituto Português de Oncologia de Coimbra, Francisco Gentil, EPE	Coimbra	IV-a
LVT	Instituto Português de Oncologia de Lisboa, Francisco Gentil, EPE	Lisbon	IV-a
Center	Instituto Português de Oncologia do Porto, Francisco Gentil, EPE	Porto	IV-a
Algarve	Centro de Medicina Física de Reabilitação do Sul	São Brás de Alportel	IV-b
Center	Centro de Medicina Física de Reabilitação da Região Centro - Rovisco Pais	Cantanhede	IV-b
North	Centro de Medicina Física de Reabilitação do Norte	Valadares	IV-b
LVT	Centro Hospitalar Psiquiátrico de Lisboa	Lisbon (Hospital Júlio de Matos)	IV-c
North	Hospital de Magalhães Lemos, EPE	Porto	IV-c
Azores	Unidade de Saúde de São Miguel	Ponta Delgada (Hospital de Ponta Delgada)	N/A
Azores	Unidade de Saúde da Terceira	Angra do Heroísmo (Hospital de Santo Espírito de Angra do Heróismo and Centro de Oncologia Professor José Conde)	N/A
Azores	Unidade de Saúde do Faial	Horta (Hospital da Horta)	N/A
Madeira	Hospital Central do Funchal	Funchal (Hospital Dr. Nélio Mendonça and Hospital dos Marmeleiros)	N/A

=== Social hospitals ===
The social hospitals, are those ones managed by private institutions of social solidarity, namely the traditional Portuguese misericórdias (holy houses of mercy). These hospitals have agreements with the National Health Service, being public subsidized and providing healthcare to the users of that system in the same way as the public hospitals.

Historically, the misericórdias were the main hospital care providers in Portugal, since their creation in the end of the 15th century to the nationalization of the management of their hospitals in the 1970s. Traditionally, the State only kept the direct administration of some public hospitals, located mainly in Lisbon, Coimbra and Porto. The vast majority of the rest of the hospitals were owned and managed by the misericórdias, although under the administrative and technical supervision of the State and inserted in the public hospital network. In 1974, the administration of all central and district hospitals owned by the misericórdias was nationalized and transferred to the State direct management, although not their property. In 1975, the same disposition was applied to the local hospitals and later to other specialized hospitals owned by the misericórdias. The Basic Law of Health of 1990 and the National Health Service Statute of 1993 allowed the devolution to the misericórdias of the administration of the hospitals owned by them. However, only some cases of devolution occurred.

Presently, there are 12 hospitals of social nature under the administration of the misericórdias.

=== Private hospitals ===
Portugal has a number of private hospitals mainly focused in providing medical care to the health subsystems (special professional health schemes) and private health insurance schemes beneficiaries.

Many of these are part of hospital and clinic networks owned by private healthcare corporations, with some major players being the Luz Saúde (formerly a division of the Espírito Santo Financial Group and now part of the Fidelidade insurance group), the CUF (the healthcare division of the Mello group) and the Lusíadas Saúde (formerly part of the Caixa Geral de Depósitos group and now a division of the Brazilian Amil healthcare group).

Below is the list of some of the main private hospitals in Portugal:

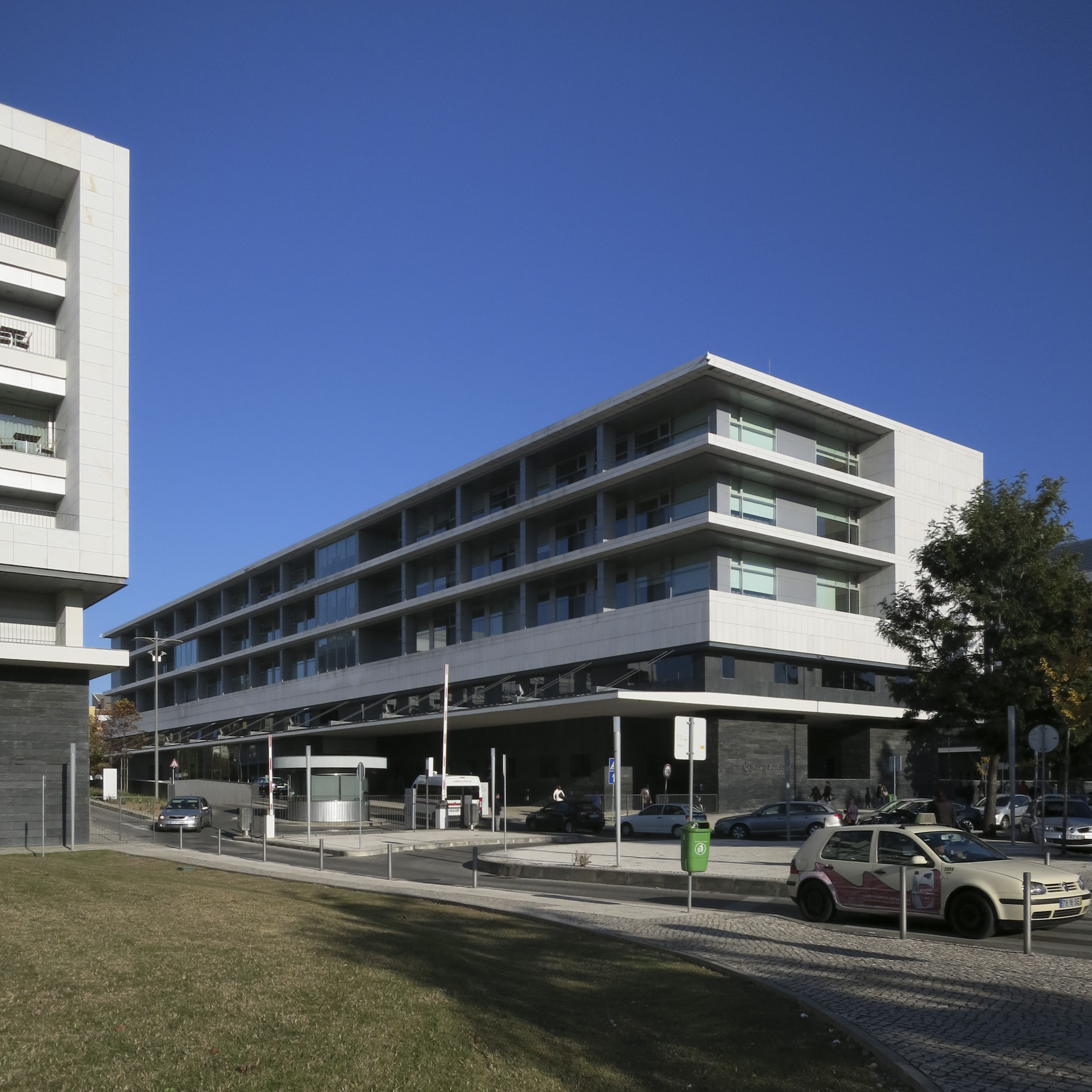
Luz Hospital, Lisbon

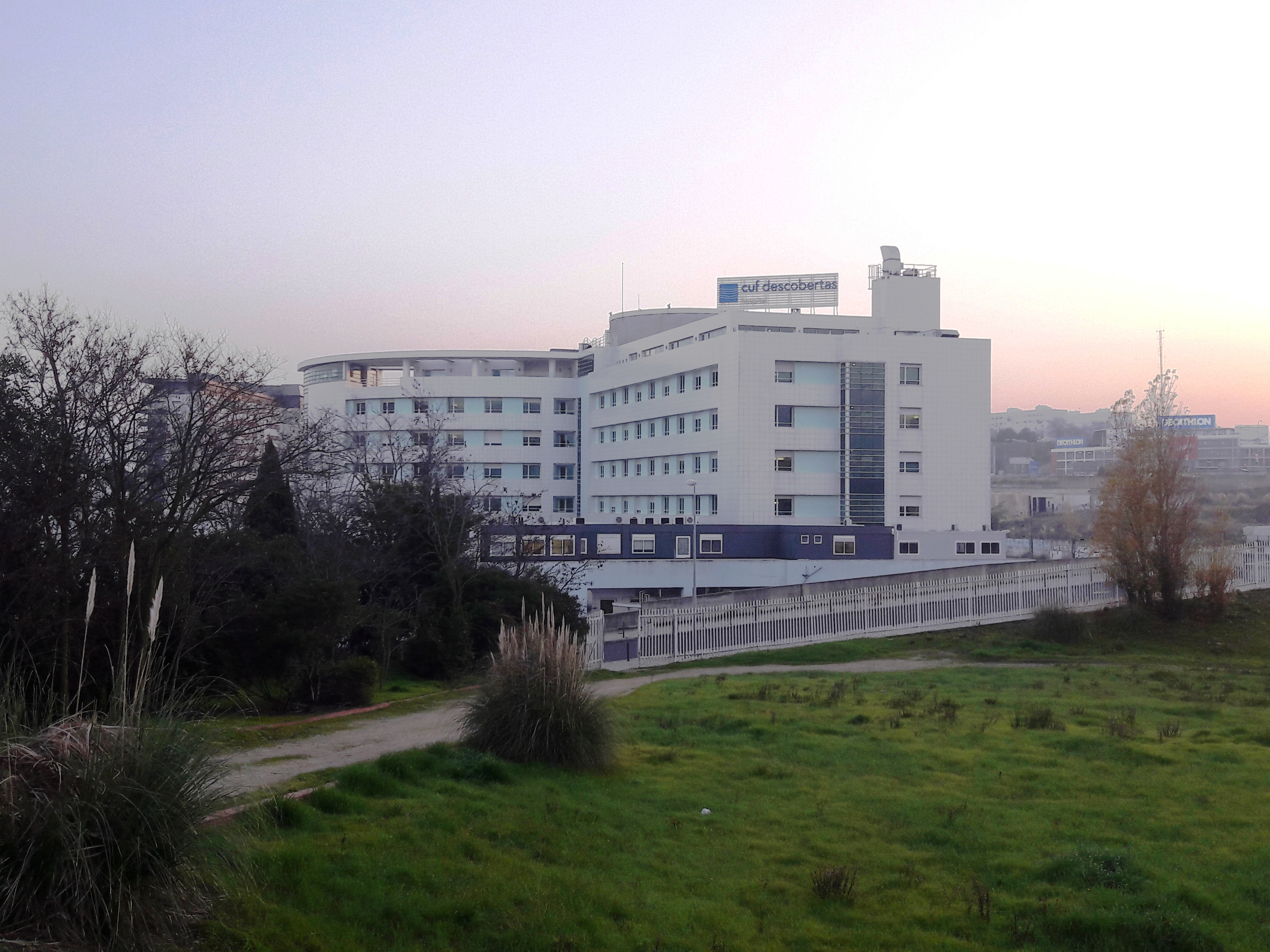
CUF Descobertas Hospital, Lisbon

Hospital	Location	Owner / network
Hospital da Luz Torres de Lisboa (former British Hospital)	Lisbon	Luz Saúde
Hospital da Cruz Vermelha Portuguesa	Lisbon	Portuguese Red Cross
Casa de Saúde - Clínica Infante Santo, Lda	Lisbon	
Casa de Saúde de Amares, Lda	Amares	
Casa de Saúde de São Mateus, Lda	Viseu	
Casa de Saúde do Barreiro	Barreiro	
Casa de Saúde do Senhor da Serra, Lda	Belas	
Centro de Genética Clínica Prof. Amândio Tavares, SA	Porto	
Centro Hospitalar de São Francisco, SA	Leiria	SANFIL Medicina, SA
Clínica de Todos os Santos, Lda	Lisbon	
Clinigrande - Clínica da Marinha Grande, Lda	Marinha Grande	
Cliria - Hospital Privado de Aveiro, SA	Aveiro	Luz Saúde
Cliria (Oiã) - Hospital Privado de Aveiro, SA	Aveiro	Luz Saúde
CLISA - Clínica de Santo António, SA	Amadora	
HOPALIS - Hospital Particular de Lisboa, SA	Lisbon	
Hospital CUF Descobertas	Lisbon	CUF
Hospital CUF Tejo	Lisbon	CUF
Hospital CUF Porto	Porto	CUF
Hospital da Arrábida - Gaia, SA	Vila Nova de Gaia	Luz Saúde
Hospital da Luz	Lisbon	Luz Saúde
Hospital da Luz Guimarães	Guimarães	Luz Saúde
Hospital da Misericórdia de Évora, SA	Évora	Luz Saúde
Hospital da Ordem Terceira	Lisbon	Third Order of St. Francis
Hospital da Trofa	Trofa	Trofa Saúde SGPS, SA
Hospital de Saint Louis	Lisbon	Société Française de Bienfaisance en Portugal
Hospital de Santiago	Setúbal	Luz Saúde
Hospital Particular de Viana do Castelo, Lda	Viana do Castelo	
Hospital Particular do Algarve, SA	Portimão	
Hospital Privado da Boa Nova	Perafita	Trofa Saúde SGPS, SA
Hospital Privado de Braga	Braga	Trofa Saúde SGPS, SA
Hospital Residencial do Mar	Bobadela	Luz Saúde
Clipóvoa - Hospital Privado	Póvoa de Varzim	Luz Saúde
HPA - Hospital Particular de Almada, Lda	Almada	
HPP Hospital da Boavista	Porto	Lusíadas Saúde
HPP Hospital de Santa Maria de Faro	Faro	Lusíadas Saúde
HPP Hospital de São Gonçalo de Lagos	Lagos	Lusíadas Saúde
HPP Hospital dos Lusíadas	Lisbon	Lusíadas Saúde
Instituto CUF Diagnóstico e Tratamento	Senhora da Hora	CUF
SANFIL - Casa de Saúde Santa Filomena, SA	Coimbra	SANFIL Medicina, SA
Hospital SAMS	Lisbon	Trade Union of the Bank Employees

=== Other hospitals ===
- Hospital das Forças Armadas (military)
- Hospital Real de Todos os Santos (destroyed by the 1755 Lisbon earthquake)
- Hospitais Civis de Lisboa (extinct local network)
- Santa Casa da Misericórdia (national network)

== Health Cluster Portugal ==
Champalimaud Foundation in Lisbon, a world class biomedical research institution and one of the founders of the HCP.

Portugal has been identified as a center of competence in health connected activities, with the potential to become a cluster of excellence with international vocation.

In order to develop that potential, in 2008, several public and private organizations related with the health sector - including medical services providers, pharmaceutical industrial companies, universities and research and development entities - founded the Health Cluster Portugal (HCP). Its objective is to make Portugal a competitive player in the research, design, development, manufacture and marketing of products and associated health services in niche markets and selected technology, targeting the most demanding and most important international markets.

The strategy of the HCP focuses in the development of the following areas:

- Welfare and active ageing;
- Preventive medicine in the areas of neurodegenerative, cancer, cardiovascular, osteochondropathy, inflammatory, infective and metabolic diseases;
- Health tourism;
- eHealth.

== See also ==
- Health in Portugal
- Emergency medical services in Portugal
