= Instituto Português de Oncologia Francisco Gentil =

- Government of Portugal
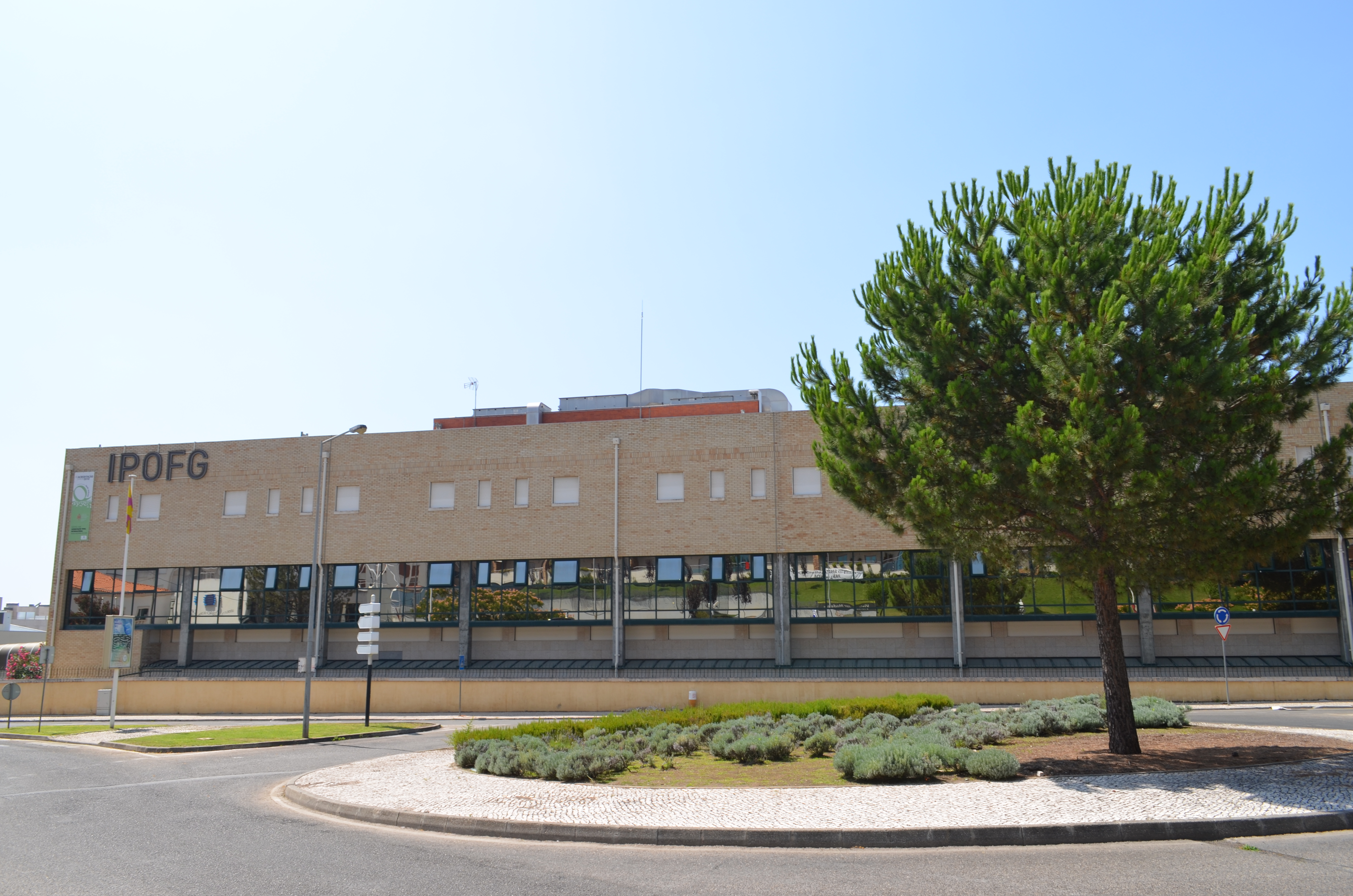
- Instituto Português de Oncologia Francisco Gentil, Coimbra branch

Geography
- Location: Lisbon, Portugal
- Coordinates: 38.739926°N 9.161391°W

Organisation
- Type: Specialist

Services
- Speciality: Oncology

Links
- Lists: Hospitals in Portugal

The Instituto Português de Oncologia Francisco Gentil, also known as the Instituto Português de Oncologia (I.P.O.), Portuguese for Portuguese Oncology Institute, is a state-run cancer hospital and research organization in Portugal. The I.P.O. has autonomous regional branches in Lisbon, Porto and Coimbra.

== History ==
The Francisco Gentil Portuguese Institute of Oncology was created on December 29, 1923, as the Portuguese Institute for the Study of Cancer (IPEC), by decree 9333. It had, at this time, provisional headquarters at the Hospital de Santa Marta in Lisbon.

Four years later, in 1927, the first IPO pavilion was inaugurated, designated Pavilion A, which was located in Palhavã, Lisbon. The 7-hectare site on which it is located was acquired that same year with funds provided by the Compulsory Social Insurance Institute. In accordance with what Dr. Francisco Gentil (one of the driving forces behind the creation of the IPO) had projected, Pavilion A was equipped with a Laboratory for Isotope Research for Medical Applications, after the donation of funds by the patient Abílio Lopes do Rego (who gave his name to the laboratory). More recently and according to the demands of evolution, this space gave way to the current Nuclear Medicine Laboratory.
