= Hospital de Santo António dos Capuchos =

- Central Lisbon University Hospital Centre
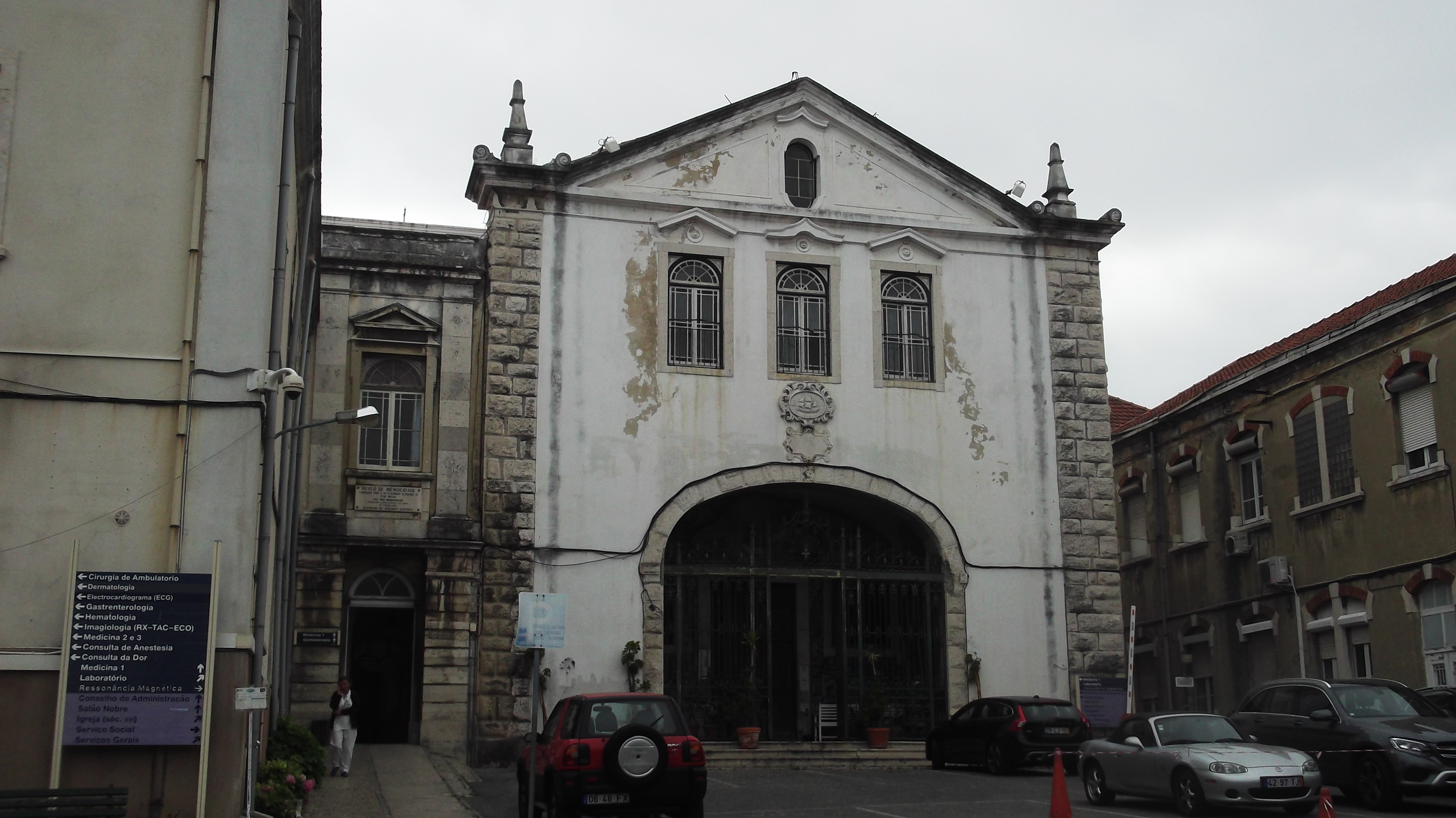
- Façade of the hospital chapel, the 16th-century conventual church

Geography
- Location: Alameda de Santo António dos Capuchos, Santo António, Lisbon, Portugal
- Coordinates: 38.7225°N 9.1421°W

Organisation
- Care system: National Health Service
- Type: Group III (Central Hospital)

Services
- Emergency department: No

History
- Founded: 1928 (98 years ago)

Links
- Website: www.chlc.min-saude.pt/hospital-dos-capuchos/
- Lists: Hospitals in Portugal

Hospital de Santo António dos Capuchos (European Portuguese pronunciation: [ɔʃpiˈtal dɨ ˈsɐ̃tu ɐ̃ˈtɔni.u ðuʃ kɐˈpuʃuʃ, - ˈsɐ̃tw ɐ̃ˈtɔnju -]; "Hospital of Saint Anthony of the Capuchins"), more commonly referred to simply as Hospital dos Capuchos, is a public Central Hospital serving the Greater Lisbon area as part of the Central Lisbon University Hospital Centre (CHULC), a state-owned enterprise.

The complex results from several modifications of the former Convent of Saint Anthony of the Capuchins, established in 1579 and partially destroyed in the 1755 Lisbon earthquake. In 1836, Queen Maria II converted the former convent into an Asylum for the Poor. In 1928, the Asylum was transferred to the town of Alcobaça and the complex was repurposed into a hospital.
