= Hospital dos Marmeleiros =

- Serviço de Saúde da RAM (SESARAM)

Geography
- Location: Monte (Funchal), Madeira, Portugal
- Coordinates: 32°40′17.7″N 16°54′31.1″W

Organisation
- Type: General

Services
- Emergency department: Yes
- Beds: 120

History
- Founded: November 1930

Links
- Website: http://www.sesaram.pt
- Lists: Hospitals in Portugal

Hospital dos Marmeleiros is a hospital in Monte (Funchal), Madeira. In November 1930, the building was completed and the first patients were transferred there, making it one of the first hospitals in the country.
