= Hospital de Santa Maria =

- Northern Lisbon University Hospital Centre
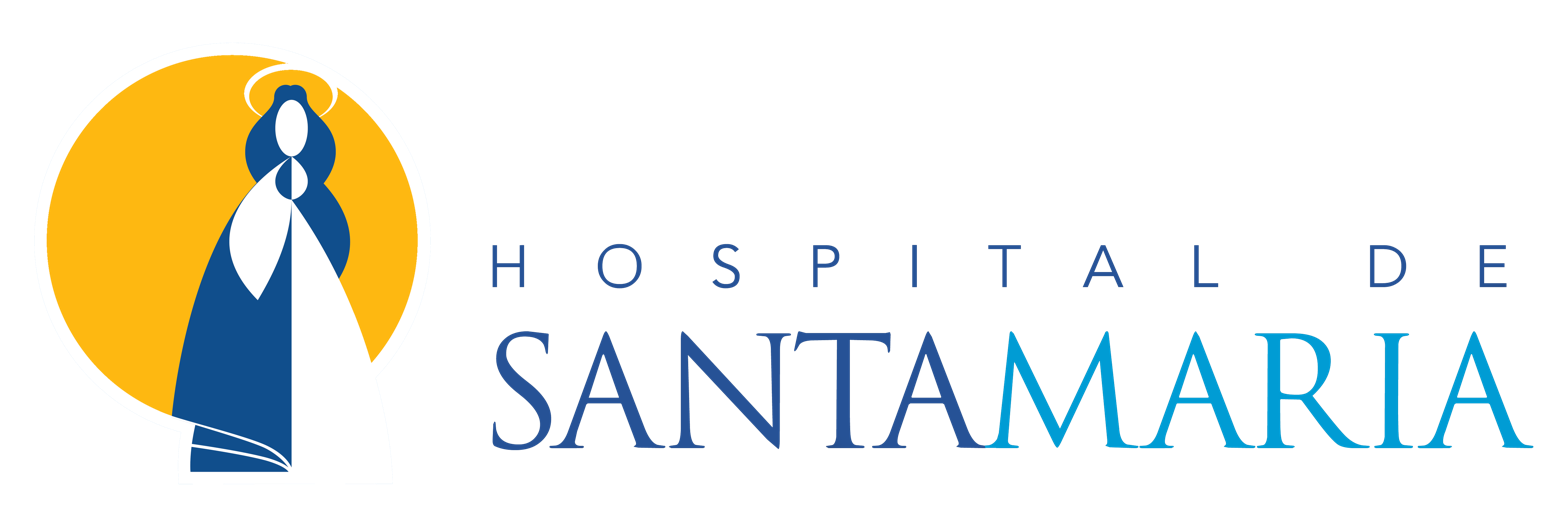

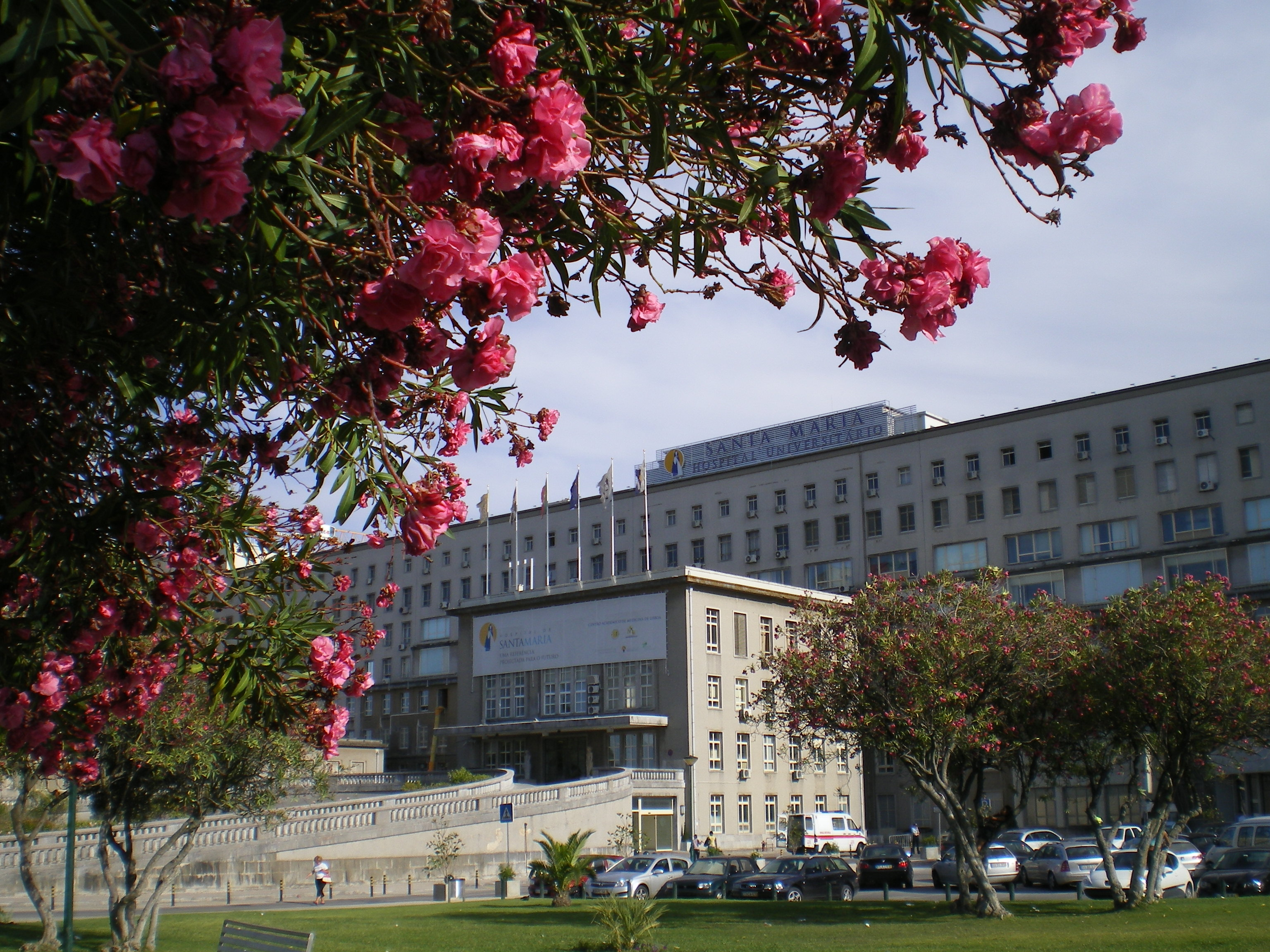

Geography
- Location: Avenida Professor Egas Moniz, Alvalade, Lisbon, Portugal
- Coordinates: 38.7485°N 9.1606°W

Organisation
- Care system: National Health Service
- Type: Group III (Central Hospital)
- Affiliated university: Faculty of Medicine of the University of Lisbon

Services
- Emergency department: Yes

History
- Founded: 27 April 1953 (73 years ago)

Links
- Website: www.chln.pt
- Lists: Hospitals in Portugal

Hospital de Santa Maria MHM (European Portuguese pronunciation: [ɔʃpiˈtal dɨ ˈsɐ̃tɐ mɐˈɾi.ɐ]; "Saint Mary's Hospital") is a public Central Hospital serving the Greater Lisbon area as part of the Northern Lisbon University Hospital Centre (CHULN), a State-owned enterprise. Santa Maria is the largest hospital in Portugal.

== History ==
Saint Mary's Hospital is located in the Cidade Universitária, the main campus of the University of Lisbon and ISCTE – University Institute of Lisbon, within the civil parish of Alvalade. Designed by German architect Hermann Distel, it was built from 1940 to 1953, meant as a new University Hospital housing the Faculty of Medicine of the University of Lisbon.
