= Lisbon (region) =

Lisbon Lisboa
- Region
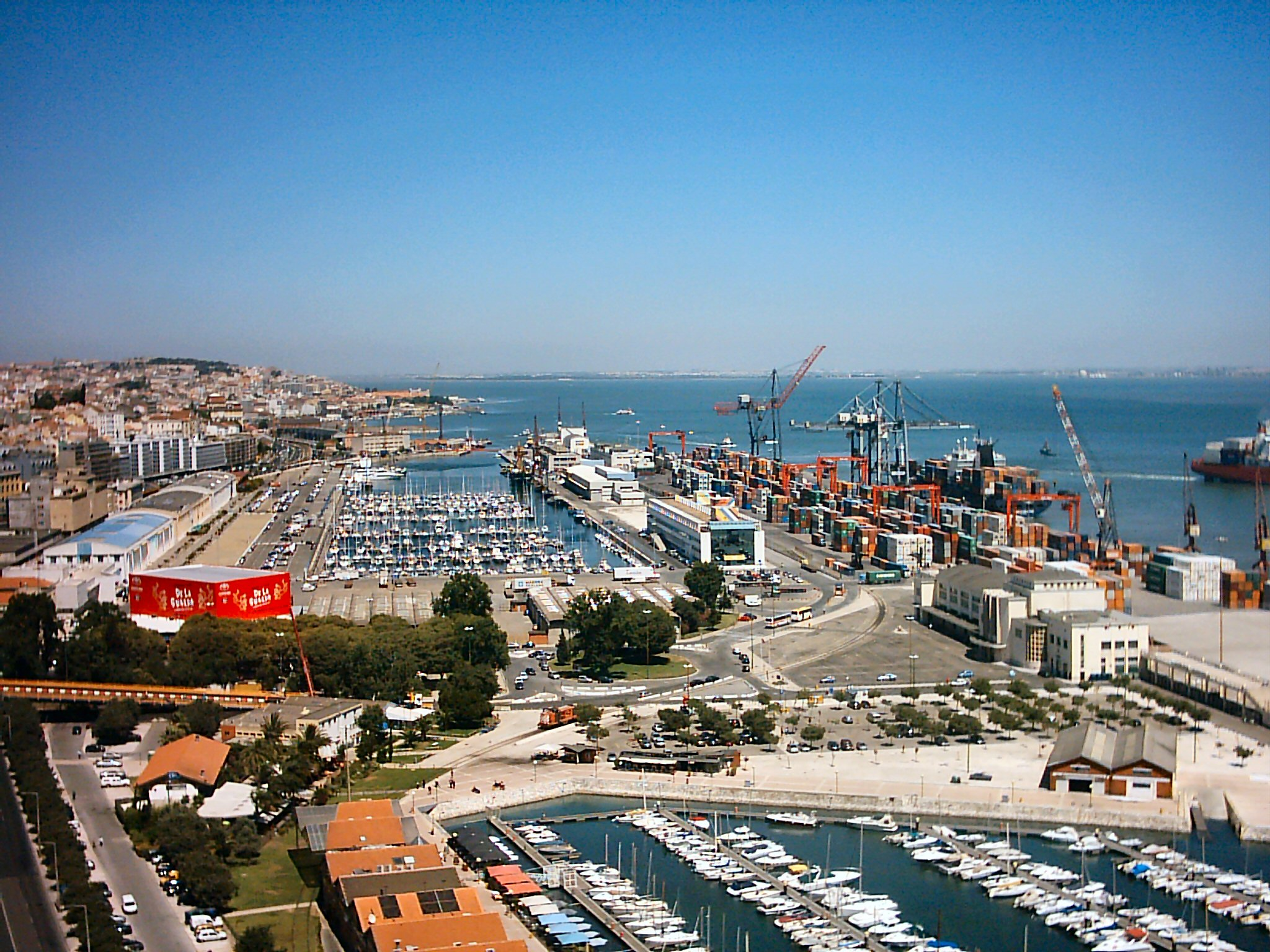
- The port of Lisbon, the terminus of activities in the Region of Lisboa, that extends into Tagus estuary
- Etymology: Lisboa, Portuguese for Lisbon
- Location of Lisbon within Portugal
- Country: Portugal
- Capital and largest city: Lisbon

Area
  - Total: 3,001.95 km^{2} (1,159.06 sq mi)

Population (2024)
  - Total: 3,005,119 (2nd)
  - Density: 1,001.06/km^{2} (2,592.72/sq mi)

GDP
  - Total: €98.517 billion (2023)
  - Per capita: €33,270 (2023)
- Time zone: UTC+0 (WET)
  - Summer (DST): UTC+1 (WEST)
- ISO 3166 code: PT-11
- NUTS: PT17
- Statistics from INE (2005); geographic detail from Instituto Geográfico Português (2010)

Lisbon (Portuguese: Lisboa) was one of the seven NUTS level 2 designated regions of Portugal, which coincided with the NUTS level 3 subregion Lisbon Metropolitan Area, in the Eurostat Nomenclature of Territorial Units for Statistics of 2021, which was valid until 31 December 2024. With the 2024 revision of NUTS, this Lisbon region was split into two NUTS level 2 regions; this division is kept in the NUTS 2027 classification, which is valid from 1 January 2027. The name of the region in the 2021 NUTS classification was "Área Metropolitana de Lisboa".

The region covers an area of 3001.95 km^{2} (the smallest region on mainland Portugal) and includes a population of 3,005,119 inhabitants according to the 2024 estimates (the second most populated region in Portugal after the Norte region), a density of 1001 inhabitants/km^{2}.

Considered as representing the Lisbon Metropolitan Region. It is a region of significant importance in industry (light and heavy), services, and it is highly urbanized. The gross domestic product (GDP) of the region was nearly 100 billion euros in 2023, accounting for 37% of Portugal's economic output. GDP per capita was at 33,300 euros or 87% of the EU27 average in the same year. The GDP per employee was 92% of the EU average.

== History ==
Prior to 2002, the area was included within the NUTS II region of Lisbon and Tagus Valley (that also included three other subregions). Before 2015, the region was divided into two NUTS III subregions: Grande Lisboa and Península de Setúbal.

== NUTS II region and area of intervention of the CCDRLVT ==
"Despite the territorial configuration for statistical purposes (National Statistical System in Portugal), in force since 2002, matching the NUTS II the Lisbon, Region Greater Lisbon (AML) - composed only NUTSIII Greater Lisbon and Setúbal Peninsula - the area of intervention of the CCDRLVT - Steering Committee and Regional Development, abbreviated to CCDR - (the Lisbon and the Tagus Valley), continues to be composed of 5 NUTSIII (Sub-regions: Greater Lisbon, Setúbal Peninsula, Middle Tagus, and Lezíria West Coast).

For the Regional Funds, management responsibilities under the policy of the European Union in Portugal, this regions it's the region of Lisbon that consists of Grande Lisboa and Península de Setúbal, for regional planning (Run, monitor and evaluate, at regional level, policies on environment, nature conservation, land management and city) the region is called Lisbon and the Tagus Valley (LVT), composed by 5 NUTSIII (Sub-regions: Greater Lisbon, Setúbal Peninsula, Middle Tagus, and Lezíria West Coast)."

== Municipalities ==
Municipality	Area (km^{2})	Population (2024)	Pop. Density (hab./km^{2})	Freguesias	Statistical subregion
Alcochete	128.36	20,462	159.41	3	Península de Setúbal
Almada	70.21	183,643	2,615.62	11	Península de Setúbal
Amadora	23.79	181,607	7,633.75	11	Grande Lisboa
Barreiro	36.39	81,131	2,229.49	8	Península de Setúbal
Cascais	97.4	222,339	2,282.74	6	Grande Lisboa
Lisbon	100.1	575,739	5,751.64	24	Grande Lisboa
Loures	167	209,877	1,256.75	18	Grande Lisboa
Mafra	291.5	91,248	313.03	17	Grande Lisboa
Moita	54.6	70,399	1,289.36	6	Península de Setúbal
Montijo	340.5	60,612	178.01	8	Península de Setúbal
Odivelas	26.6	156,278	5,875.11	7	Grande Lisboa
Oeiras	45.8	177,866	3,883.54	10	Grande Lisboa
Palmela	465.9	74,462	159.82	5	Península de Setúbal
Seixal	95.7	176,883	1,848.31	6	Península de Setúbal
Sesimbra	195.7	56,576	289.10	3	Península de Setúbal
Setúbal	230.3	124,339	642.25	8	Península de Setúbal
Sintra	319.4	400,947	1,255.31	20	Grande Lisboa
Vila Franca de Xira	323.5	140,711	434.96	11	Grande Lisboa
Total	2,962.4	3,005,119	1,014.42	211	
