= Hospital de Dona Estefânia =

- Central Lisbon University Hospital Centre
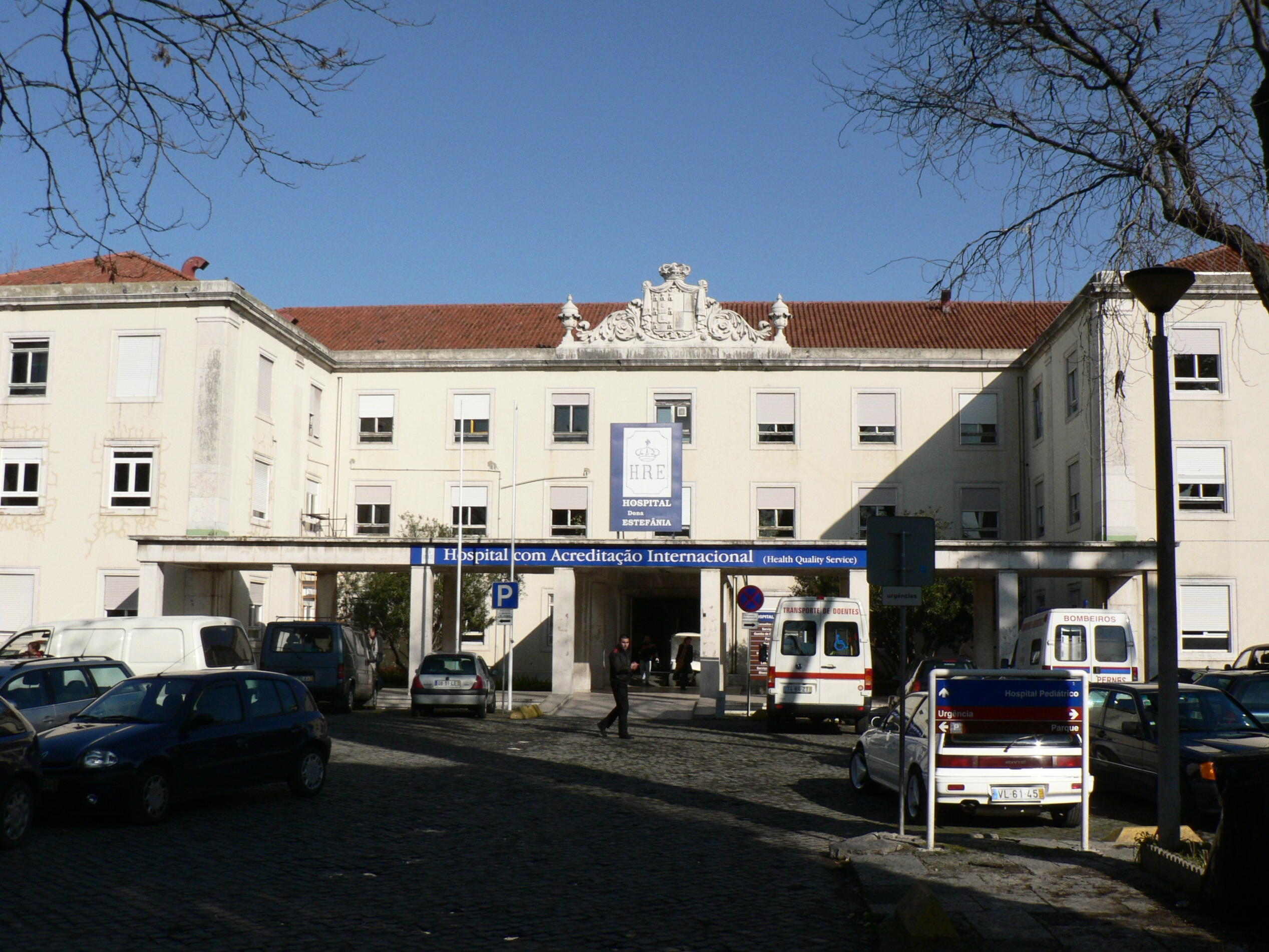
- Main façade of the hospital

Geography
- Location: Rua Jacinta Marto, Arroios, Lisbon, Portugal
- Coordinates: 38.7281°N 9.1393°W

Organisation
- Care system: National Health Service
- Type: Group III (Central Hospital)
- Patron: Stephanie of Hohenzollern-Sigmaringen

Services
- Emergency department: Yes

History
- Founded: 17 July 1877 (148 years ago)

Links
- Website: www.chlc.min-saude.pt/hospital-dona-estefania/
- Lists: Hospitals in Portugal

Hospital de Dona Estefânia (European Portuguese pronunciation: [ɔʃpiˈtal dɨ ˈðonɐ (ɨ)ʃteˈfɐnjɐ]; "Queen Stephanie's Hospital") is a public Central Hospital serving the Greater Lisbon, Portugal, area as part of the Central Lisbon University Hospital Centre (CHULC), a state-owned enterprise.

Established in 1877 in memory of Queen Stephanie, this was the first Portuguese hospital specifically dedicated to the healthcare of children, and it remains a national reference in pediatric specialties, both medical and surgical. It serves the south of the country and Insular Portugal.

== History ==
In the mid-19th century, the city of Lisbon was plagued with outbreaks of cholera and yellow fever. The young King Peter V and his consort Princess Stephanie of Hohenzollern-Sigmaringen paid frequent visits to the hospitalised patients; during one such visit to Saint Joseph's Hospital, the Queen was impressed by the fact that children were treated in the same infirmaries as adults: with the money that had come from her dowry, Queen Stephanie proposed first the creation of a children's infirmary and then of an entire hospital devoted to poor ailing children.

The Queen's own premature death of diphtheria in 1859 did not allow her to see her project to completion: her widowed husband King Peter V ordered the construction of the new hospital in a plot of land originally belonging to the extensive grounds of Bemposta Palace. The king passed away childless one year later, and the Bemposta Hospital (as it was originally called) was unveiled by Stephanie's brother-in-law King Luís I, on 17 July 1877, the anniversary of the Queen's death, having previously ceded ownership of the hospital to the public.

The construction of the hospital was carefully planned by a commission presided by the King, and comprising Bernardino António Gomes Jr., Francisco António Barral, the Baron of Kessler, Dr. Simas, the Count of Ponte, and General Filipe Folque (Director-General of Geodesic and Cartographic Works). After several contacts with foreign specialists in London, Berlin, and Paris, the chosen project was that of British architect Albert Jenkins Humbert, on the recommendation of Prince Albert.

When it was built, Queen Stephanie's Hospital was considered a model children's hospital, encompassing all the modern improvements in hospital construction of the day. Florence Nightingale wrote, on her Notes on Hospitals that "if children's hospitals are to be built at all, this is the kind of plan that should be adopted", calling its wards the best in Europe. Bernardino António Gomes, the King's personal physician, wrote that "the Bemposta Hospital has the elegance not of lavishness, but of simplicity and harmony" and that "its magnificence is not that of luxury and sumptuosity, but that of hygiene".

=== Marian apparitions ===
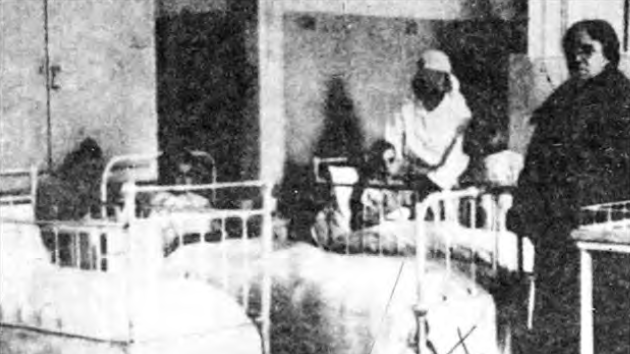
Photograph showing the ward of Queen Stephanie's Hospital where St. Jacinta Marto was hospitalised in February 1920. Bed No. 38, in which she died, is the second from the left.

Queen Stephanie's Hospital is also notable for having been the place where Saint Jacinta Marto was hospitalised, and in due course died, in 1920 after having succumbed to the great influenza pandemic that swept through Europe following the end of the First World War.

By February 1920, Jacinta had developed purulent left pleurisy with fistulisation and osteitis of the 7th and 8th rib. On 10 February, the chief surgeon, Dr. Leonardo de Sousa Castro Freire, assisted by Dr. Elvas removed two ribs only under local anesthetic, since, because of the condition of her heart, she could not be fully anesthetised: she suffered terrible pain, which she said would help to convert many sinners. On 19 February, Jacinta asked the hospital chaplain who heard her confession to bring her Holy Communion and administer Extreme Unction because she was going to die "the next night". He told her that her condition was not that serious and that he would return the next day. The following day Jacinta was dead.
