= Península de Setúbal =

Setúbal Peninsula Península de Setúbal Região da Peninsula de Setúbal
- NUTS II Region
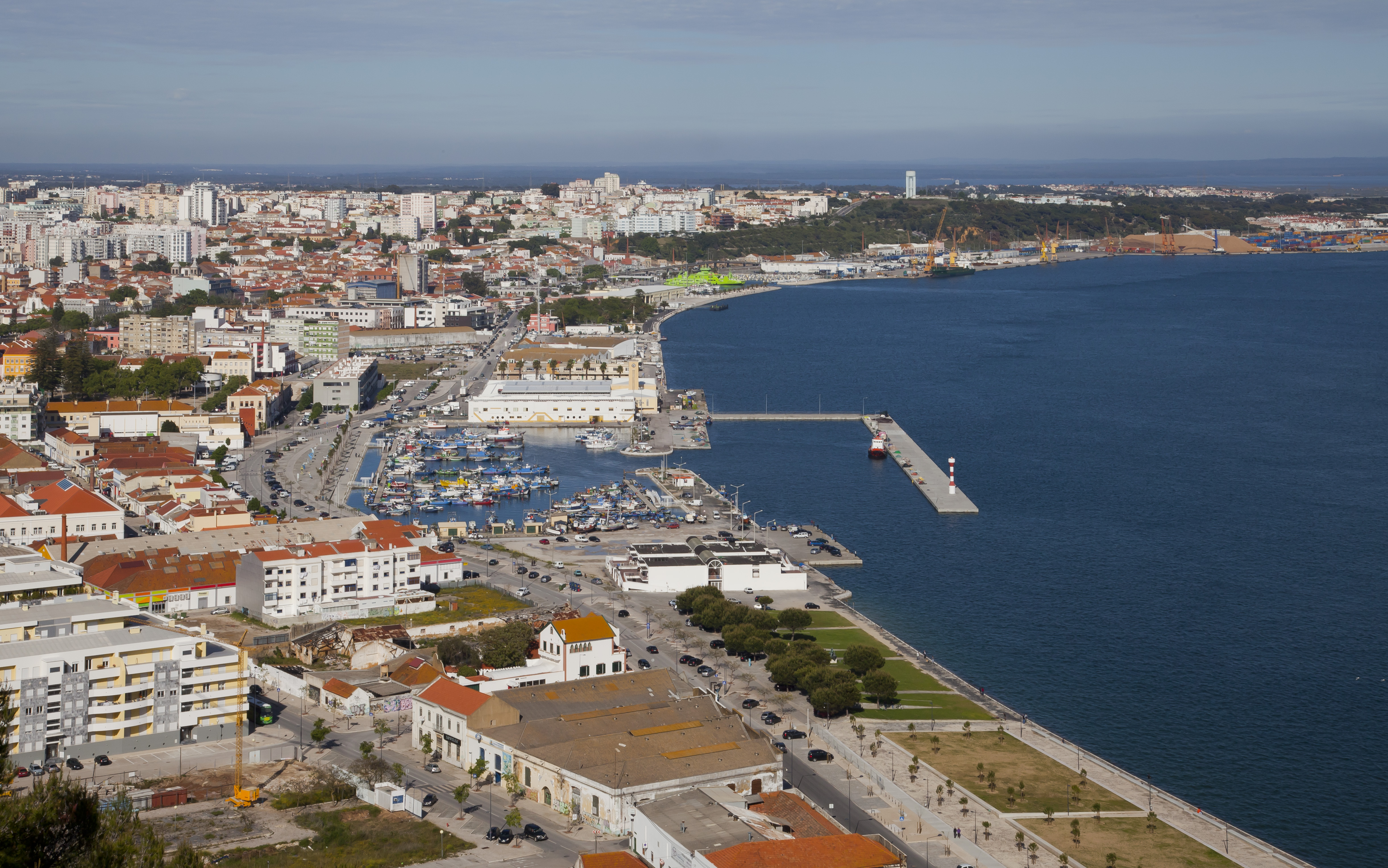
- A view from the city of Setúbal, in the central place in the subregion
- Etymology: Portuguese for the Peninsula of Setúbal
- Interactive map of Setúbal Peninsula
- Country: Portugal
- Region: Lisboa
- Capital: Setúbal

Area
  - Total: 1,729 km^{2} (668 sq mi)

Population (2011)
  - Total: 779,373
  - Density: 450.8/km^{2} (1,167/sq mi)

GDP (nominal)
  - Total: €15.320 billion (2024)
  - Per capita: €18,205 (2024)
- Time zone: UTC+0 (WET)
  - Summer (DST): UTC+1 (WEST)
- ISO: PT
- NUTS: PT1B
- Statistics from INE (2005); geographic detail from Instituto Geográfico Português (2010)

The Setúbal Peninsula (Note: European Portuguese: [pɨˈnĩsulɐ ðɨ sɨˈtuβal]) (Note: Portuguese: Península de Setúbal) is a NUTS II and a NUTS III subdivision of Portugal. Comprising several municipalities and urban centres, the subregion's capital is Setúbal, and includes several other cities including Almada.

== History ==
The region of Setúbal was a pioneer in the development of a regional strategic plan to assist the growth of the economic, social and cultural institutions. The Plano Integrado para o Desenvolvimento para o Distrito de Setúbal (PIDDS) which was elaborated in the 1980s by the Associação de Municípios do Distrito de Setúbal (Association of Municipalities of the District of Setúbal), constituted the first development plan for the district, and envisioned a series of measures that were essential for the ambitious plans of its inhabitants.

In 2000, under the initiatives of the Association of Municipalities (today AMRS; Associação de Municípios da Região de Setúbal), established a formal Strategic Plan for Development (Plano Estratégico para o Desenvolvimento da Península de Setúbal), or PEDEPES, with the slogan Mais Desenvolvimento, melhor Futuro (More development, better future). A formal presentation occurred in December 2004, resulting from diagonistic phases and objectives, that presented 132 concrete measures based on the Strategic Plan. The development of the PEDEPES involved the participation and consensus of 239 entities in and the Strategic plan continues to be a fundamental instrument in the regional intervention process.

== Municipalities ==
The subregion of the Peninsula of Setúbal comprises nine municipalities extending from the southern margin and mouth of the Tagus into the interior, and southern coast. They include:

- Alcochete
- Almada
- Barreiro
- Moita
- Montijo
- Palmela
- Seixal
- Sesimbra
- Setúbal

=== Urban centres ===
Although the cities of Portugal have no political stature, for social and economic purposes they form as distinct centres of urban activity. The region of the Peninsula of Setúbal include several large centres, including Almada, Setúbal, Amora, Barreiro, Seixal, Montijo and Costa da Caparica, in addition to the larger towns of Sesimbra, Moita, Palmela, Alcochete, Corroios, Pinhal Novo, Monte da Caparica, Charneca da Caparica, Trafaria, Lavradio and Baixa da Banheira.

== See also ==
- Setúbal DOC
