= São José Hospital =

- Centro Hospitalar Universitário de Lisboa Central
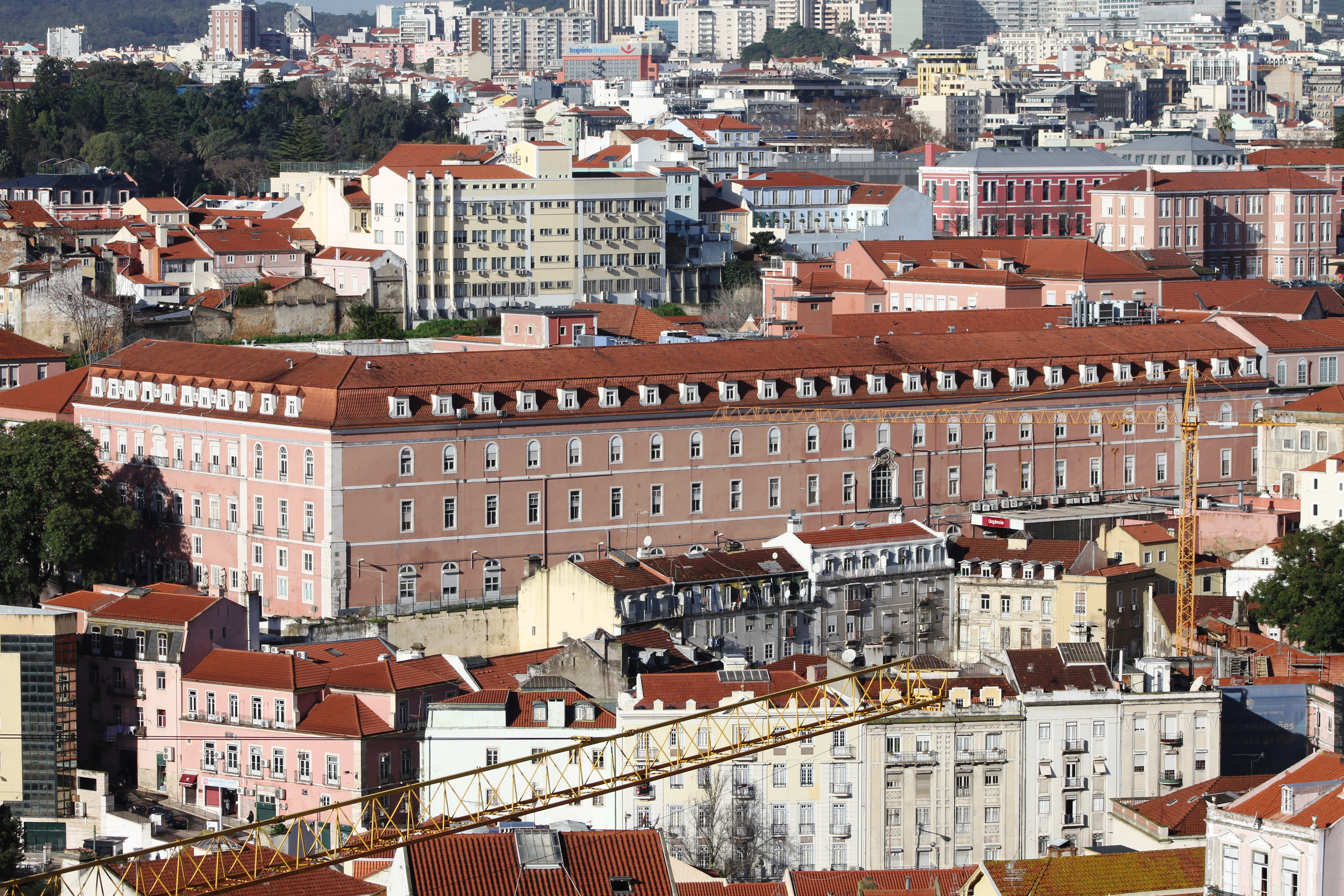
- View of São José from Graça Viewpoint

Geography
- Location: Rua José António Serrano, Arroios, Lisbon, Portugal
- Coordinates: 38.7169°N 9.1371°W

Organisation
- Care system: National Health Service
- Type: Group III (Central Hospital)
- Affiliated university: NOVA Medical School
- Patron: St Joseph

Services
- Emergency department: Yes

History
- Founded: 3 April 1775 (251 years ago)

Links
- Website: www.chlc.min-saude.pt
- Lists: Hospitals in Portugal

São José Hospital (Portuguese: Hospital de São José, pronounced [ɔʃpiˈtal dɨ sɐ̃w ʒuˈzɛ]) is a public Central Hospital serving the Greater Lisbon area as part of the Centro Hospitalar Universitário de Lisboa Central (CHULC), a state-owned enterprise.

São José has operated as a hospital since 1775, following the destruction of its institutional predecessor as the main public hospital in the city of Lisbon, the 15th-century All Saints' Royal Hospital, in the 1755 Lisbon earthquake.

== History ==
The building that today houses São José Hospital was built starting in 1579, under the patronage of Cardinal Henry of Portugal, to house the College of Saint Anthony the Great (Portuguese: Colégio de Santo Antão), an important Jesuit-run educational institution that was up until then located in the Mouraria quarter. The college was transferred to this new building on 8 November 1593.

The 1755 Lisbon earthquake destroyed much of the Lisbon downtown, where the central Royal Hospital of All Saints was located. The hospital was greatly damaged, and the surviving patients were provisionally housed in undamaged convents and palaces until such a time the hospital was rebuilt.

It was around this time that tensions between the Portuguese crown and the Jesuits came to an all-time high after King Joseph I's chief minister, Sebastião José de Carvalho e Melo, Marquis of Pombal, implicated them in the Távora affair. In 1759, the Jesuits were expelled from Portugal and its dominions, and the Portuguese crown seized their assets — among them, the College of Saint Anthony the Great.

Due to financial constraints, All Saints' Royal Hospital was never fully rebuilt. Following the nationalisation of the old and now vacant Jesuit College, the hospital facilities were transferred there, and it received its first patients on 3 April 1775; the old hospital was finally demolished to make way for a new square, Praça da Figueira, and the new repurposed premises were christened Saint Joseph's Royal Hospital (Portuguese: Hospital Real de São José), paying homage to King Joseph I.

Not unlike All Saints' Hospital before it, Saint Joseph's was the country's greatest school of surgery. In 1825, King John VI created the Royal School of Surgery (Portuguese: Escola Régia de Cirurgia), which would later evolve into the Lisbon Medical-Surgical School following Passos Manuel's reforms in 1836.

In 1844, Saint Joseph's Hospital annexes the first of what would become long list of hospitals, the nearby Leper Hospital of Saint Lazarus (Portuguese: Gafaria de São Lázaro). Not long after, the Rilhafoles Mental Asylum (some time later renamed Miguel Bombarda Hospital) and the Desterro Hospital also became institutionally attached to Saint Joseph's — the beginnings of an hospital centre that was then called, collectively, "Saint Joseph's Hospital and Annexes" (Portuguese: Hospital de São José e Anexos). Other hospitals within the city also merged into the centre: Hospital de Dona Estefânia in 1877, Hospital de Arroios in 1892, Hospital de Santa Marta in 1903, Hospital de Curry Cabral in 1906, Hospital de Santo António dos Capuchos in 1928. From 1913, the hospital center became known as the "Hospitais Civis de Lisboa" (HCL, transl. Civil Hospitals of Lisbon); it is currently called the Centro Hospitalar Universitário de Lisboa Central (CHULC).

== See also ==
- List of Jesuit sites
