= Grande Lisboa =

Region of Portugal

Coordinates: 38°42′N 9°11′W

Greater Lisbon Grande Lisboa
- NUTS II Region
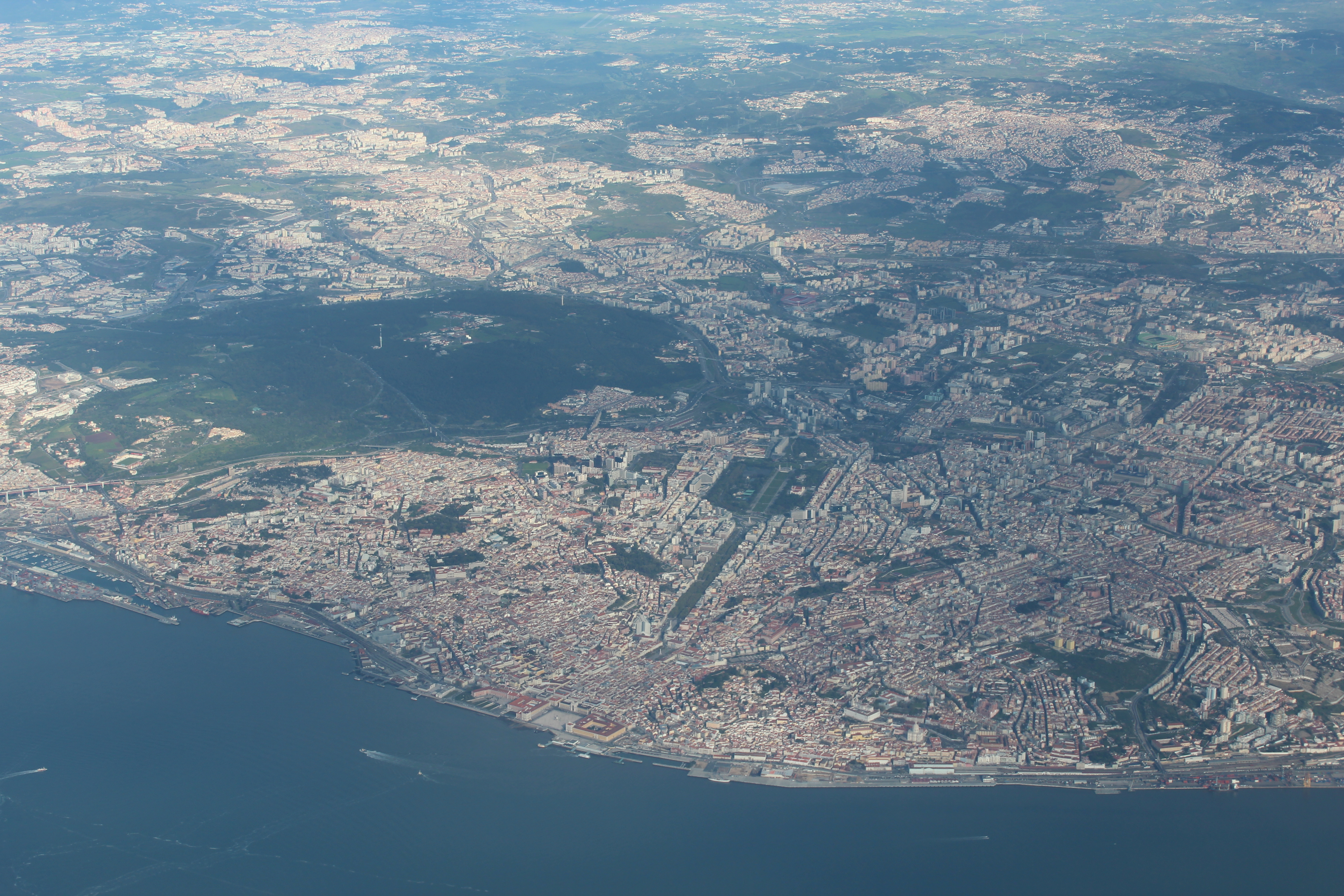
- Aerial view of the Greater Lisbon area
- Etymology: Grande Lisboa, Portuguese for Greater Lisbon
- Interactive map of Greater Lisbon
- Country: Portugal
- Capital: Lisbon

Area
  - Total: 1,389.97 km^{2} (536.67 sq mi)

Population (2025)
  - Total: 2,415,261 (2nd)
  - Density: 1,737.64/km^{2} (4,500.45/sq mi)

GDP (nominal)
  - Total: €90.686 billion (2024)
  - Per capita: €42,345 (2024)
- Time zone: UTC+0 (WET)
  - Summer (DST): UTC+1 (WEST)
- ISO 3166 code: PT1A
- NUTS: PT1A0

Grande Lisboa (European Portuguese pronunciation: [ˈɡɾɐ̃dɨ liʒˈβoɐ]) or Greater Lisbon is a Portuguese NUTS II and III region and subregion. It was previously only a NUTS III subregion integrated in the Lisboa Region and, previously, in the Lisboa e Vale do Tejo until it was abolished at the January 2015 NUTS 3 revision. It was revived as both a NUTS 2 and 3 overlapped circumscription in the 2024 revision. It is part of the historical Estremadura Province. It includes the capital and prime city of Portugal, Lisbon (Lisboa in Portuguese). It is the main economical subregion of the country. It covers 1,376 km^{2} and it is the most populous and most densely populated Portuguese subregion (2,415,261 inhabitants and 1,737.6 inhabitants/km^{2}).

== Overview ==
In spite of getting the name Grande Lisboa, the subregion did not take the entire area of the Lisbon metropolitan area, because it does not include the municipalities on the South bank of the Tagus river estuary, known as Península de Setúbal, which the term at times also applied to.

The area is bordered in the North by the Centro Region, in the West by the Atlantic Ocean, in the East by the Ribatejo region and in the South by the Tagus River estuary.

This subregion is the leading services center for the entire country and it also has a large industrial output. It is served by the busiest Portuguese airport, an international harbor and an extensive network of highways, and mass transportation, like commuter, regional and international railways.

== Municipalities ==
| Municipality | Area (km^{2}) | Population (2021) | Population (2025) | District inclusion | Cultural Region inclusion |
|---|---|---|---|---|---|
| Amadora | 24 | 171,454 | 205,517 | Lisboa | Estremadura |
| Cascais | 97 | 214,124 | 242,619 | Lisboa | Estremadura |
| Lisbon | 85 | 545,796 | 658,236 | Lisboa | Estremadura |
| Loures | 169 | 201,590 | 236,988 | Lisboa | Estremadura |
| Mafra | 292 | 86,515 | 96,146 | Lisboa | Estremadura |
| Odivelas | 26 | 148,034 | 185,736 | Lisboa | Estremadura |
| Oeiras | 46 | 171,658 | 188,056 | Lisboa | Estremadura |
| Sintra | 319 | 385,606 | 449,956 | Lisboa | Estremadura |
| Vila Franca de Xira | 318 | 137,529 | 152,007 | Lisboa | Ribatejo |
| Total | 1,377 km^{2} | 2,062,306 | 2,415,261 | | |

The main urban centers are Lisboa, Amadora, Algueirão-Mem Martins, Agualva-Cacém, Queluz and Odivelas.
