= Graça Freitas =

Portuguese public health specialist and Director-General of Health

Graça Freitas GCM
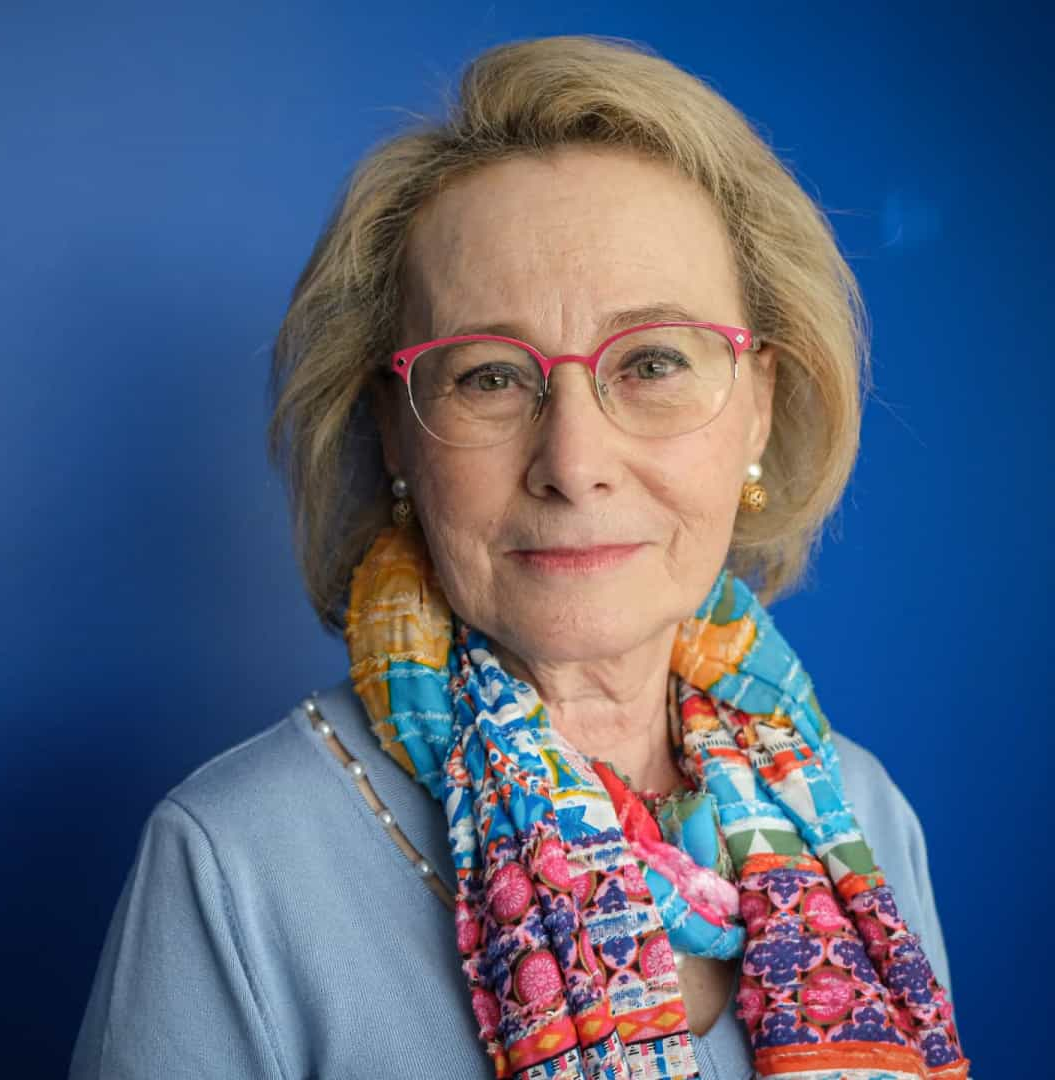
- Freitas in 2020

Chancellor of the Orders of Civil Merit
- Incumbent
- Assumed office 20 July 2026
- President: António José Seguro
- Preceded by: Maria Helena Nazaré

Director-General of Health
- In office 1 January 2018 – 1 August 2023
- Appointed by: Adalberto Campos Fernandes
- Preceded by: Francisco George
- Succeeded by: André Peralta Santos

Personal details
- Born: Maria da Graça Gregório de Freitas; 26 August 1957 (age 69) Nova Lisboa, Portuguese Angola
- Education: University of Lisbon

Maria da Graça Gregório de Freitas GCM (born 26 August 1957) is a Portuguese physician and public health specialist who was the Director-General of Health and inherently the chief medical officer and leading spokesperson on matters of public health in Portugal, between 2018 and 2023. She has work published in the fields of vaccination, prevention and control of communicable diseases, public health emergencies, and health communication.

Before her appointment to the Directorate-General, she served as Deputy Director-General under her predecessor Francisco George, and coordinated several public health programmes, most notably, since 1996, the Portuguese National Vaccination Programme. She is also a member of the Management Board of the European Centre for Disease Prevention and Control, of the World Health Organization Expanded Program on Immunization, among other international groups.

Due to her prominent national role during the COVID-19 pandemic in Portugal, Graça Freitas was included in Jornal de Negócios's list of 50 Most Powerful People of 2020, which included both Portuguese and international personalities.

== Early life and education ==
She was born in 1957, in Nova Lisboa (present-day Huambo), in Angola, which was at the time the Overseas Province of Angola, a territory under Portuguese rule. Her father was a civil servant in the Angolan public administration, and her mother a homemaker. By her own account, the figure of the health officer (delegado de saúde), which was very important in that territory, might have drawn her to public health; alternatively, she also recalls being influenced by two very good friends. Initially, she had considered a career in agriculture or silviculture, but her parents discouraged it due to it being uncommon to see women in agricultural engineering at the time; in her teenage years, she had also considered architecture.

She enrolled in Medicine at the University of Luanda in 1974, the year of the Carnation Revolution. Angola achieved independence from Portugal the following year through the Alvor Agreement; in 1975, she departed for Portugal and concluded her studies in the Faculty of Medicine of the University of Lisbon in 1980. She specialised in public health in 1988, having conducted her postgraduate training in the Hospital de Santa Maria in Lisbon and, for eight months, in a community primary healthcare unit in Ponte de Sor, a rural municipality in Alentejo.

== Career ==
Graça Freitas was a public health Assistante and an Assistante Graduada (consultant) in the Ajuda community health centre in 1990 and again between 1992 and 1996; she also worked as the chief health officer in Lisbon, and as member of the Group for the Guarantee of Quality of the Lisbon Regional Health Administration. During this time, she took a particularly interest in the vaccination of the people in Ajuda and Restelo, which she described as "a sort of a crusade". In 1990–1991, she worked for the Directorate of Health Services of Macau, where she was a chief health officer, the coordinator of the community health centres, and supervised the public health internship programme.

After having collaborated with José Pereira Miguel in a research project, she was invited to become his assistant professor in the Faculty of Medicine of the University of Lisbon, and filled the position for over twenty years, from 1995 to 2017. She often delivered her lectures sitting beside her students in the amphitheatre, encouraging discussion. She did not, however, pursue an academic career, or enroll on a doctoral programme. From 2000 to 2004, she also taught at the University's Faculty of Dental Medicine.

In 1996, at the invitation of Jorge Torgal, she joined the Directorate-General of Health as Head of the Division for Communicable Diseases, and Coordinator of the National Vaccination Programme. From 1998, she also Chaired the Technical Committee on Immunization. In 2005, she was first appointed Deputy Director-General and was entrusted with several different roles: she was responsible for Influenza Pandemic Contingency Plan (2006–2007), for the Services of Epidemiology and Health Statistics (2007–2012), for the Division of Disease Prevention and Control (2007–2009), for the functional axis for the prevention, containment and control of influenza pandemics (2009–2010), for the Services of Disease Prevention and Control (2009–2012), and for the Services of Disease Prevention and Health Promotion (2012–2017).

In a 2018 interview, Graça Freitas mentioned the 2003 SARS epidemic and the "profound anguish" until the causative agent, SARS-CoV, was identified, as the most complicated moment in her career at the Directorate-General of Health. She also recalled having cried as WHO Director-General Margaret Chan announced the start of the 2009 swine flu pandemic on live television, as it brought to mind the devastation of the 1918 flu pandemic. She stood by the "excessive" stockpiling of the antiviral Oseltamivir, as only in hindsight could it be known that the pandemic was to turn out to be much milder than expected.

=== Director-General of Health ===
Graça Freitas succeeded Francisco George as Director-General of Health in 2018, the second woman to fill the position, after Maria Luísa van Zeller in the 1960s; Freitas had already been filling the position in an interim capacity since George reached the age of retirement in October 2017. Immediately after replacing George, she had to deal with a small chickenpox outbreak; as Director-General she was also responsible for the response to two legionellosis outbreaks, a measles outbreak, an influenza-related excess mortality and a heat wave.

==== COVID-19 pandemic ====
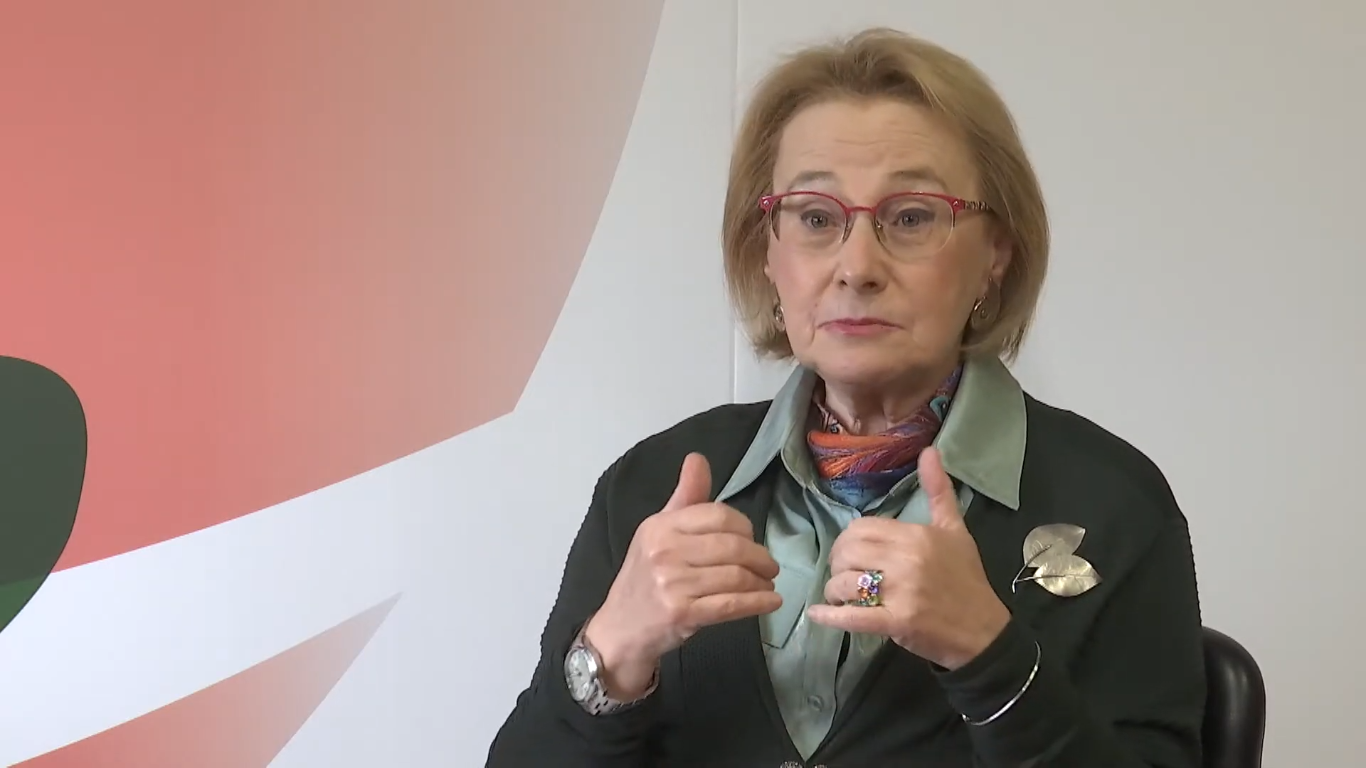
Graça Freitas in 2020

Graça Freitas took a high-profile role during the COVID-19 pandemic, and for that reason became a familiar face to the Portuguese public as she featured in daily televised updates on the pandemic, often alongside Marta Temido, Minister of Health, and António Lacerda Sales, Secretary of State for Health.

She has received criticism for her January 2020 remarks that the disease was no cause for alarm as "there is the smallest chance of person-to-person transmission" and, for that reason, considered "there [was] not a great likelihood such a virus [could] get to Portugal, as even in China the outbreak [had] been contained", calling concerns about a pandemic "a little bit excessive". This was before the first evidence of human-to-human contagion outside China emerged, and before the World Health Organization started to acknowledge these dynamics of transmission in late January and early February. The first recorded cases of COVID-19 in the country were confirmed on 2 March. She would later say she was aware of the seriousness of the situation, but admitted not to have envisioned it to take such dramatic sanitary, economic, and social proportions.

Freitas herself tested positive for COVID-19 on 1 December 2020, displaying only mild symptoms of the disease. In July 2021, it was reported that she was quarantining at home following a high-risk contact on 9 July, even after having been fully vaccinated, in strict compliance to the guidelines issued by the Directorate-General of Health.

== Awards and honours ==
For her accomplishments as coordinator of the National Vaccination Programme, Graça Freitas was awarded with the Ministry of Health Distinguished Service Medal, Silver Grade, in 2005. In 2002, she received a Commendation (Louvor) from the Minister of Health António Correia de Campos, "taking into account the quality of her work regarding transmissible diseases in general and, in particular, those preventable by vaccination." In 1985, she was similarly the recipient of a Commendation due to her work for Lisbon Regional Health Administration's Office for Epidemiology and Studies in containing the last diphtheria outbreak in the country.

In 2002, she received a Certificate of Appreciation and medal from the World Health Organization Regional Office for Europe, for her contributions to the success of the eradication of indigenous poliomyelitis in Portugal and in Europe.

=== National orders ===
- Grand Cross of the Order of Merit (16 January 2023)

== Personal life ==
She is married, and has granddaughters.

A smoker for over 20 years, she quit smoking in 2000 with the help of varenicline, motivated by Francisco George and by the increasing difficulty in climbing the steep incline of Alameda Dom Afonso Henriques to get to the offices of the Directorate-General of Health.

She practices plant collecting as a hobby and grows camellias and her favourite flower, orchids. She also enjoys travelling to visit botanical gardens. An inveterate reader, her favourite book is V. S. Naipaul's A House for Mr Biswas, which was read to her at the age of four. Her favourite song is Estrela do Mar, by Jorge Palma.

She sleeps from 1 a.m. to half-past 5 a.m. The stress of overseeing all matters of public health in Portugal during the COVID-19 pandemic, which she described as "running a marathon on the Everest", made her lose 5 to 6 kilograms in the first month after the start of the outbreak in the country.
