= Mário Coelho =

Portuguese bullfighter (1936–2020)

Mário Coelho Luís ComM (25 March 1936 ― 5 July 2020) was a Portuguese bullfighter and banderillero.

== Biography ==
Mário Coelho was born in Vila Franca de Xira, Vila Franca de Xira, Portugal, on 25 March 1936. He was banderillero in the crews of Manuel Dos Santos, José Julio, Antonio Dos Santos, Diamantino Vizeu, Francisco Corpas and Andrés Vázquez until he became novillero on 17 March 1967 in Cartagena, Spain and debuted on 4 May 1967 in Las Ventas, Madrid. On 25 July 1967, in Badajoz, he took the alternative and became matador de toros, with Julio Aparicio Martínez serving as his godfather and Manuel Cano 'El Pireo' as witness. He received a serious goring in Zafra on 5 October 1973. On 14 May 1980, he confirmed his doctorate in Madrid at the hands of Carlos Escolar Frascuelo. After a successful career in Portugal, on 20 September 1990 Coelho retired.

He was decorated as Commander of the Order of Merit on 23 June 2005.

He died on 5 July 2020, at the age of 84, in his hometown from COVID-19 after getting infected during the COVID-19 pandemic in Portugal. He was admitted to the hospital of Vila Franca de Xira on 26 June.
