= Francisco George =

Director-General of Health, Portugal (born 1947)

Francisco George GOIH
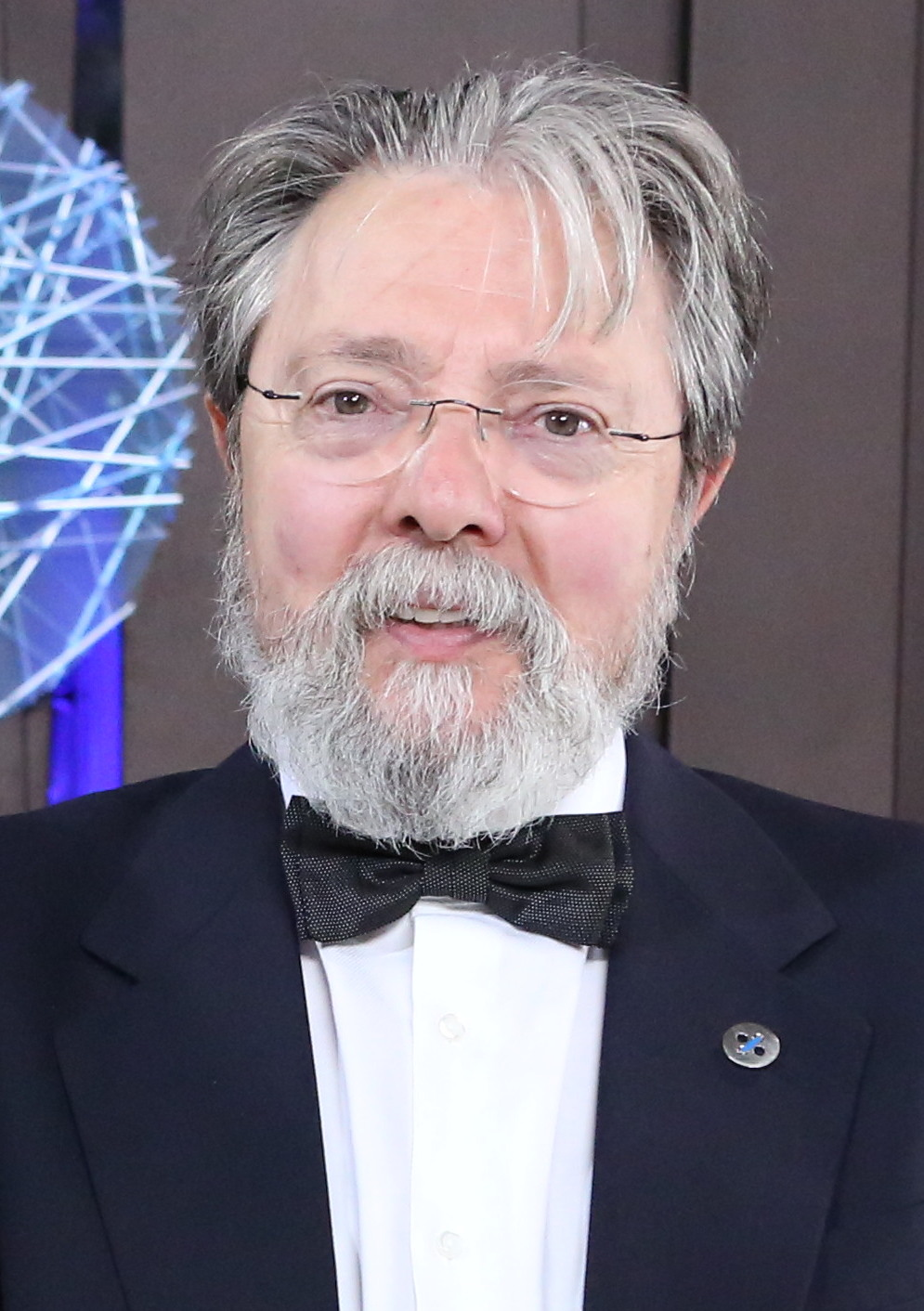
- George in 2017

President of the Portuguese Red Cross
- In office November 2017 – November 2021

Director-General of Health of Portugal
- In office 2005 – October 2017

Personal details
- Born: Francisco Henrique Moura George; 21 October 1947 (age 78) Lisbon, Portugal
- Spouse: Maria João Gaudêncio Simões George (1948-2006) (m. 1970)
- Parents: Carlos Henrique George (father); Maria Isabel Moura (mother)
- Education: University of Lisbon
- Website: www.dossierdelutas.pt

Francisco Henrique Moura George GOIH • GCM (born 1947) is a Portuguese doctor and specialist in public health, who was Director-General of Health in Portugal between 2005 and 2017. He was then president of the Portuguese Red Cross from November 2017 to November 2021.

== Early life ==
George was born on 21 October 1947 in the Portuguese capital of Lisbon. He is the great-grandson of Charles George, an English steam-power specialist who moved to Portugal in the middle of the 19th century to work for the Royal Navy Arsenal in Lisbon, maintaining and repairing ships. Charles and his wife had 14 children, including nine sons, and thus the surname of "George" is found widely in Portugal.

George's father, Carlos Henrique George, was a doctor and director of the Hospital de Santa Marta in Lisbon and his mother was Maria Isabel Moura. George had a twin brother who was born a few minutes earlier, named João. He attended the Colégio Valsassina, a private school in Lisbon where, among others, he studied under Avelino Henriques da Costa Cunhal, a noted lawyer, historian, playwright, painter, designer, and opponent of the Estado Novo dictatorship, who was the father of the Communist Party leader, Álvaro Cunhal. When he and his brother were 14 their father decided to separate them, sending them to different schools, because they were always playing around and not concentrating on their studies. His brother was eventually sent to England.

George married the architect Maria João Gaudêncio Simões (1948-2006) in 1970, having met her in England. Never having had any doubt that he would work in the field of medicine, he graduated with distinction from the Faculty of Medicine of the University of Lisbon in 1973 and then worked as an intern in internal medicine at the Hospital de Santa Marta. In 1977 he completed the public health course at the National School of Public Health of Lisbon. From 1976, he worked in the municipality of Cuba and then in the municipality of Beja, both in the Alentejo region.

== Career ==
As a World Health Organization (WHO) scholarship holder, he took the family health course offered by the WHO and the International Commission on Illumination (CIE) in 1978. Between 1980 and 1991, he was employed by the WHO, undertaking missions to Guinea-Bissau, Zimbabwe, China, Republic of the Congo, Brazil, Cape Verde, Mozambique, São Tomé and Príncipe, Mali, Madagascar, Lesotho and Zambia. In 1980 he was appointed head of the WHO Health Services Development Project in the Republic of Guinea-Bissau. In 1986, he became the WHO representative in the Republic of Guinea-Bissau and, in 1990, an epidemiologist for the WHO Global AIDS Programme and coordinator of that programme in Southern Africa.

After a public examination, George became head of the Portuguese Public Health Service in 1992. He was appointed Deputy Director-General for Health in 2001 and reappointed in 2004. He was appointed Director-General for Health, first on 16 August 2005 and then, following a public administration reform, on 6 November 2006 and again on 4 December 2009. On 5 August 2011, by joint order of Prime Minister Pedro Passos Coelho and the Minister of Health, Paulo Macedo, he was again confirmed in the post. He retired on reaching the age of 70 in 2017. After retirement he was elected as president of the Portuguese Red Cross and served in that honorary position for four years.

George was a member of the National Council for Medically Assisted Reproduction between 2007 and 2010 and has also been a member of the advisory board of the Tropical Scientific Research Institute (IICT), and chairman of the advisory board of the National Institute of Health Dr. Ricardo Jorge (INSA). In 2001, he became a member of the High-Level Health Committee and the Health Security Committee of the European Union. In 2004, he was appointed as a member of the board of directors and the programme committee of the European Centre for Disease Prevention and Control based near Stockholm in Sweden. He regularly participated in the work of the World Health Assembly, governing body of the WHO, and was an alternate member of the WHO Executive Board between 2005 and 2008. In 2014, following Portugal's election to the WHO Europe Standing Committee, he was appointed representative of Portugal for the three-year period, 2014-2017. He was a visiting assistant professor at the National School of Public Health of the NOVA University Lisbon. He is presently president of the Portuguese Society of Public Health, which aims to promote the exchange of information on the topic. He is a member of the Portuguese Epidemiology Association, the Portuguese Association for the Promotion of Public Health, the Portuguese Society of Virology, and the Portuguese Association for the Clinical Study of AIDS.

== Publications ==
George is the author or co-author of several books and many published scientific articles and has also been invited to write the foreword for several books. He is the author of the Guia de Clínica Médica (Guide to Clinical Medicine), intended for use in Portuguese-speaking African countries, published by the Calouste Gulbenkian Foundation in Lisbon in May 1983, and of the book Histórias de Saúde Pública (Stories of Public Health), published in Lisbon in 2004 by Livros Horizonte. He was the rapporteur and co-editor of the publication entitled Health in Portugal, published in English under the Portuguese Presidency of the European Union (2007).

== Awards and commendations ==
On 30 January 2006, George was awarded the rank of Grand Officer of the Order of Prince Henry, which he received on 5 March from the president of Portugal, Jorge Sampaio. On 7 April 2014, he received the Gold Medal for Distinguished Service from the Ministry of Health. On retirement from the ministry of health he was awarded the Grand Cross of the Order of Merit (Portugal) by President Marcelo Rebelo de Sousa on 5 December 2017. In the same year, he was awarded the Medal of Social Merit by Lisbon City Council. In 2019, he received the 2019 Terra Justa Award from the municipality of Fafe. Also in 2019, he was awarded the Gold Medal of the Polytechnic Institute of Lisbon.

In 2018 the ministry of health introduced an award named after George. The Francisco George Health Prize aims to promote research into public health.
