= Ministério da Saúde =

Ministério da Saúde (Ministry of Health) may refer to:

- Ministério da Saúde (Brazil), the Brazilian health ministry.
- Ministério da Saúde (Portugal), the Portuguese health ministry.
