= Order of Public Instruction =

Order of Public Instruction Ordem da Instrução Pública
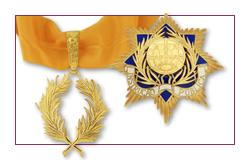
- Plaque and badge of the Commander

Awarded by Portuguese Republic
- Type: Order
- Established: 1927 as the Ordem da Instrução e da Benemerência; 1929 as the Ordem da Instrução Pública
- Awarded for: High services rendered to education and teaching.
- Status: Currently constituted
- Grand Master: President of the Portuguese Republic
- Chancellor: Graça Freitas
- Grades: Grand Cross; Grand Officer; Commander; Officer; Medal

Precedence
- Next (higher): Order of Merit
- Next (lower): Order of Entrepreneurial Merit
- Ribbon bar of Public Instruction

The Order of Public Instruction (Portuguese: Ordem da Instrução Pública) is a Portuguese order of civil merit. Established in 1927, it is conferred upon deserving individuals for "high services rendered to education and teaching."

== History ==
Established in April 1927 as the "Order of Instruction and of Benevolence" (Ordem da Instrução e da Benemerência), the order was originally designed to reward "the services of domestic or foreign enterprises to the cause of education, and all acts of public benevolence influencing the progress and prosperity of the country." In 1929, the order was reformulated and split into two distinct orders, the "Order of Benevolence" (Ordem da Benemerência), which evolved into the present-day Order of Merit and the "Order of Public Instruction," the latter being designed to reward services rendered to the cause of education; however, the original insignia of the Order of Instruction and of Benevolence was retained by the Order of Public Instruction.

The 1962 Statute of Honorific Orders of 1962 further defined the criteria for awarding the Order of Public Instruction, namely "to reward services rendered by employees in teaching or school administration" and "services rendered by any person in the cause of education or teaching." Subsequent legislation enacted the present definition.

== Grades ==
The Order of Public Instruction is awarded in the following grades:

- Grand Cross (GCIP) (Grã-Cruz)
- Grand Officer (GOIP) (Grande-Oficial)
- Commander (ComIP) (Comendador)
- Officer (OIP) (Oficial)
- Medal (MIP) (Medalha)
- Honorary Member (MHIP) (Membro Honorário)

== Insignia ==
The plaque is eight-pointed and filleted to represent rays, in gold enamel for the degrees of Grand Cross and Grand Officer and in silver for the degree of Commander. An inner eight-pointed blue enamelled star is superimposed over the plaque and overlaid with the coat of arms of Portugal in gold wreathed by two golden palms joined at their tops with their petioles crossed and bound by a wavy listel of white enamel with the legend "Instrução Pública" in gold, all indented.

The badge consists of two crossed golden palms.

The ribbon is of golden yellow silk.

== Method of wear ==
- Grand Cross: wears the badge of the order on a sash on the right shoulder, and the plaque in gold on the left chest.
- Grand Officer: wears the badge of the order on a necklet, or on a bow on the left chest for ladies, and the plaque in gold on the left chest.
- Commander: wears the badge of the order on a necklet, or on a bow on the left chest for ladies, and the plaque in silver on the left chest.
- Officer: wears the badge of the order on a ribbon on the left chest with a rosette, or on a bow on the left chest with rosette for ladies.
- Medal: wears the badge of the order on a ribbon on the left chest, or on a bow on the left chest for ladies.
