= Directorate-General of Health =

- Direção-Geral da Saúde
- Logo

Agency overview
- Formed: 4 October 1899^{[a]}
- Preceding agency: Council of Public Health (1837–1868)
- Jurisdiction: Portugal
- Headquarters: Alameda D. Afonso Henriques 45, Arroios, Lisbon, Portugal; 38°44′10.914″N 9°8′8.5416″W
- Agency executive: Rita Sá Machado, Director-General of Health
- Parent agency: Ministry of Health
- Website: www.dgs.pt

Footnotes
- ^{a} As "Directorate-General of Health and Public Beneficence" (Direção-Geral de Saúde e Beneficência Pública); reorganized 1911

The Directorate-General of Health (Portuguese: Direção-Geral da Saúde; DGS) is a division of the Portuguese public administration concerned with public health. Even though it is statutorily a service of the Ministry of Health, it is a public agency with administrative autonomy. It was created in 1899, after a plague outbreak in Porto, in order to coordinate efforts and planning against future disease outbreaks and epidemics.

Its main attributions are to regulate, guide and coordinate the activities of health promotion and disease prevention within the country, to set the technical conditions for adequate healthcare, to prepare and assure the execution of the National Health Plan, and to manage public health emergencies.

The Directorate-General of Health is governed by a Director-General who is, as part of their functions, the country's Chief Medical Officer (Portuguese: Autoridade de Saúde Nacional, literally the "National Health Authority"). The current Director-General of Health is Graça Freitas, having taken office on 1 January 2018.
