= Ana Jorge =

Portuguese pediatrician, politician and former Minister of Health

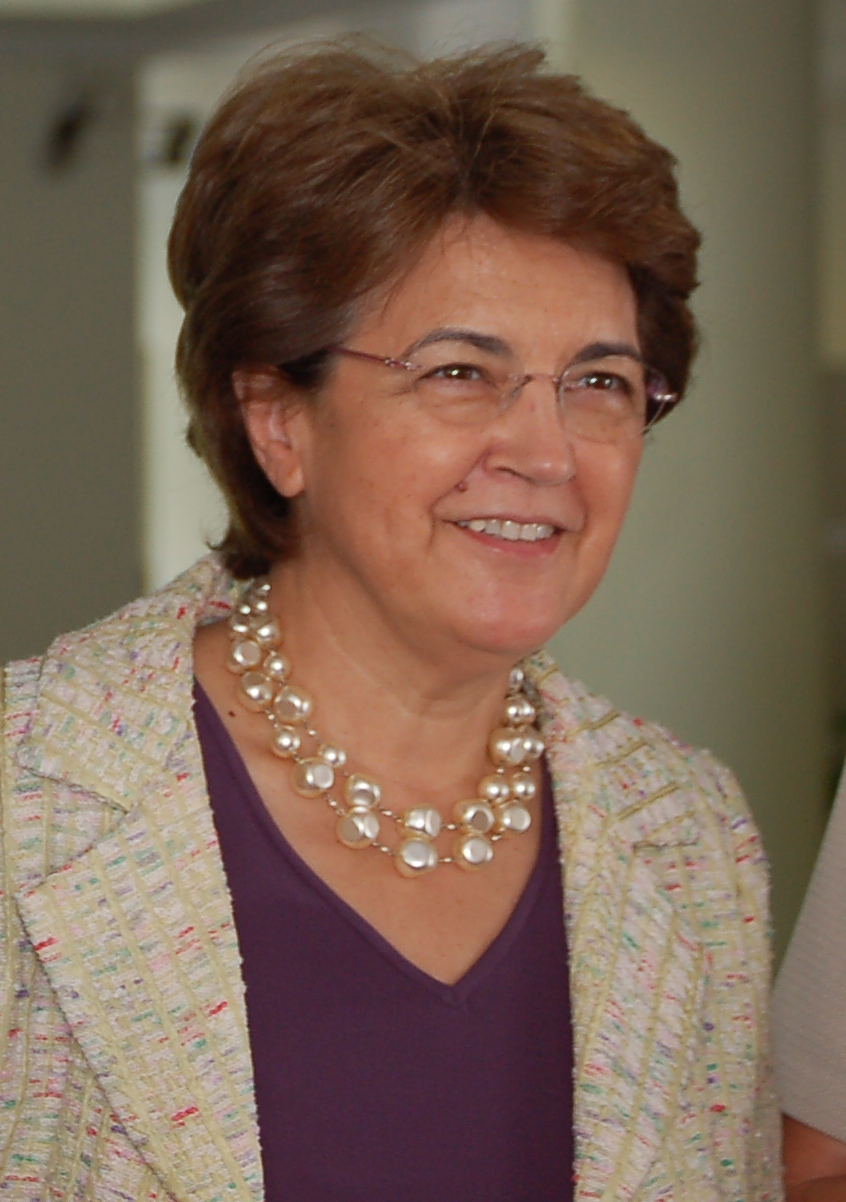
- Jorge in 2010

Minister of Health
- In office 2008–2011

Deputy of the Portuguese Assembly of the Republic
- In office 2009–2011

Personal details
- Born: Ana Maria Teodoro Jorge; 23 September 1949 (age 77) Lourinhã, Portugal
- Party: Portuguese: Socialist Party (PS)
- Education: University of Lisbon

Ana Maria Teodoro Jorge (born 23 September 1949) is a Portuguese pediatrician and politician. She is a member of the Socialist Party, and served as Minister of Health between 2008 and 2011.

== Early life and career ==
Ana Maria Teodoro Jorge was born on 23 September 1949 in Lourinhã in Portugal. In 1983, she obtained a degree in medicine from the Faculty of Medicine of the University of Lisbon. The following year she qualified for specialization in pediatrics. Having worked at the Caneças Health Centre in Greater Lisbon between 1977 and 1983, she became a pediatric nurse at the Hospital de Dona Estefânia in the centre of Lisbon for seven years from 1984. From October 1991, she moved to the Garcia de Orta hospital. From 1985 to 1992, she also worked as an assistant at the National School of Public Health of NOVA University Lisbon, specializing in maternal, child, school and adolescent health. Jorge was appointed Director of the Pediatrics Department at Garcia de Orta Hospital briefly in 1996, and again from June 2001 to January 2008.

In March 1996, Jorge became coordinator of the Lisbon health sub-region, then took over the presidency of the Regional Health Agency (ARS) of Lisbon and the Tagus Valley from January 1997 until December 2000. She was a member of the national leadership of the Portuguese League for the Fight against Epilepsy from 1987 to 1994, and was a member of the leadership of the Pediatrics Group of the Ordem dos Médicos (Order of Physicians), which serves as the regulatory and licensing body for the medical profession, for five years from 1993. Her other roles have included being President of the UNICEF National Committee for Baby-Friendly Hospitals, from 2012.

== Political career ==
On 31 January 2008, Ana Jorge was appointed Minister of Health in the first government of José Sócrates, leader of the Socialist Party (PS). She replaced António Correia de Campos. This appointment caused some surprise because, in addition to being independent, Jorge had supported the socialist Manuel Alegre in the 2006 presidential election against Mário Soares, official candidate of the PS. In the following national elections in September 2009, Jorge was placed first on the list of PS candidates for Coimbra and secured a seat in the Assembly of the Republic. With Sócrates continuing as Prime Minister, she retained her post as Minister of Health until the elections of 2011, after which she was replaced by Paulo Macedo. Jorge was also President of the Municipal Assembly of Lourinhã from 2005 to 2013.

== Honours and awards ==
- Jorge received the Pais e Filhos (Parents and Children) Trophy awarded by Pais e Filhos magazine in 1994.
- She received the Medal of Merit from the Order of Physicians in 2018.
- She received the Distinguished Service Gold Medal from the Ministry of Health in 2019.
