= José Júlio =

Portuguese bullfighter (1937–2021)

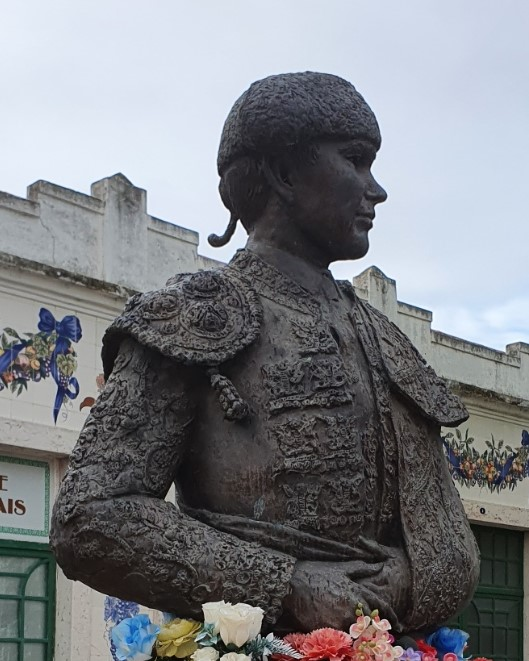
Bust of José Júlio in front of the Vila Franca de Xira Municipal Market.

José Júlio Venâncio Antunes (31 January 1935 – 29 January 2021) was a Portuguese bullfighter.

== Biography ==
José Júlio was born on 31 January 1935, in Vila Franca de Xira, Vila Franca de Xira, Portugal. He made his debut in Las Ventas bullring, Madrid in September 1959. His alternative came a month later, on 11 October 1959, in Zaragoza, Spain, being godfather Chicuelo II and witness Gregorio Sánchez. Confirmed his alternative on 16 May 1960, before Julio Aparicio Martínez as godfather and Luis Segura as witness. In 1963, in Seville suffered a serious goring. He retired on 5 October 1989 in his hometown and subsequently continued to participate in festivals even in his seventies.

He got infected from COVID-19 during the COVID-19 pandemic in Portugal and was admitted to the Hospital of Vila Franca de Xira, where he died from the virus on 29 January 2021, at the age of 84.
