= Fernando Leal da Costa =

Portuguese physician and politician (born 1959)

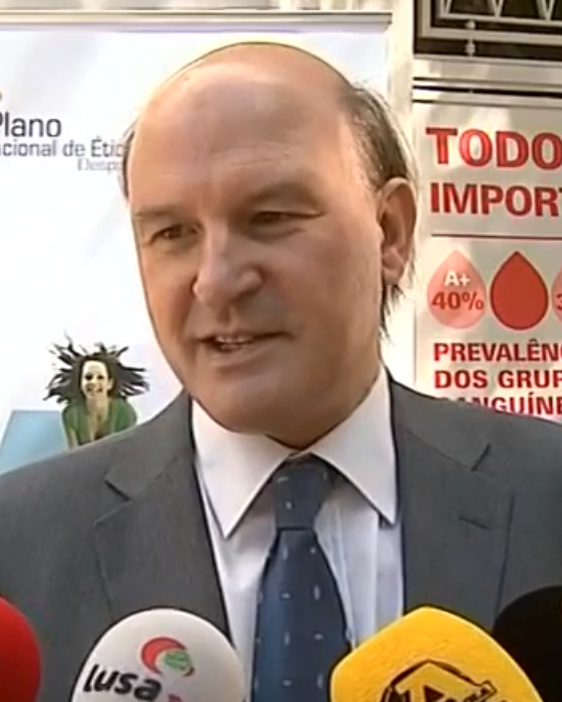
- Leal da Costa in 2014

Minister of Health
- In office 30 October 2015 – 26 November 2015
- Prime Minister: Pedro Passos Coelho
- Preceded by: Paulo Macedo
- Succeeded by: Adalberto Campos Fernandes

Personal details
- Born: 27 August 1959 (age 67) Lisbon, Portugal
- Party: Independent
- Education: University of Lisbon
- Profession: Physician

Fernando Serra Leal da Costa (born 27 August 1959) is a Portuguese physician and politician who briefly served as Minister of Health in 2015, in the XX Constitutional Government of Portugal.

== Early life and education ==
Leal da Costa was born in Lisbon on 27 August 1959. He graduated in Medicine from the Faculty of Medicine of the University of Lisbon in 1983.

== Medical career ==
Leal da Costa specialized in Clinical Hematology and Medical Oncology and served as head of the Hematology Department at the Portuguese Institute of Oncology Francisco Gentil, in Lisbon. Before entering politics, he held several roles, including Deputy Director-General of Health (2001–2002), member of the Coordination Committee for the National Health Plan (2003–2004), and National Coordinator for Oncological Diseases (2005–2006).

== Political career ==
In 2011, Leal da Costa was appointed Assistant Secretary of State to the Minister of Health in the XIX Constitutional Government of Portugal, under Paulo Macedo. He later succeeded Macedo as Minister of Health in 2015.
