= Order of Merit (Portugal) =

Civil merit order of Portugal

Order of Merit Ordem de Mérito
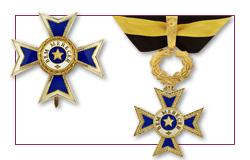
- Plaque and badge of the Commander

Awarded by Portuguese Republic
- Type: Order
- Established: 1927 as the Order of Instruction and of Benefaction; 1929 as the Order of Benefaction; 1976 Current form
- Eligibility: Portuguese and foreign citizens; military or civilian
- Awarded for: Meritorious acts or services in the exercise of any functions, public or private, revealing self-sacrifice in favor of the community.
- Status: Currently constituted
- Grand Master: President of the Portuguese Republic
- Chancellor: Graça Freitas
- Grades: Grand Cross; Grand Officer; Commander; Officer; Medal

Precedence
- Next (higher): Order of Camões
- Next (lower): Order of Public Instruction
- Ribbon bar of the Order of Merit

The Order of Merit (Portuguese: Ordem de Mérito) is a Portuguese honorific order of civil merit intended to award those responsible for meritorious acts or services performed in the exercise of any functions, both in the public and the private sphere, which reveal self-sacrifice in favor of the community. The decorations are given by the President of the Portuguese Republic, in his role as the Grand-Master of the Portuguese Honorific Orders. The Order of Merit can be awarded, during life or posthumously, to both Portuguese and foreign citizens; it can also be awarded to localities or institutions that are legal persons governed by public law or of public utility. This order has been awarded to a number of people performing the most diverse functions such as ambassadors, businesspeople, military personnel, athletes and musicians.

== History ==
The Order of Merit has its origin in April 1927, when the Order of Instruction and Benefaction (Original Portuguese: Ordem da Instrução e da Benemerência) was created. The goal of this now extinct order was to distinguish the services performed by people or corporations in order to further the instruction in the country. In 1929, the Order of Instruction and Benefaction was split in two different orders, the Order of Benefaction and the Order of Public Instruction, with the former now solely awarding acts related to social causes, public assistance and goodwill. In 1976, the order was renamed to its current title.

== Grades ==
- Grand Cross (GCM) (Grã-Cruz)
- Grand Officer (GOM) (Grande-Oficial)
- Commander (ComM) (Comendador or Comendadeira)
- Officer (OM) (Oficial)
- Medal (MedM) (Medalha)
- Honorary Member (MHM) (Membro Honorário) (to institutions and localities)

== Notable recipients of the Order of Merit ==
Name	Post-nominal	Occupation	Date appointed
Carlos Manuel Cabral Verissimo	ComM	Businessman	10 June 1990
José Cardoso Pires	GCM	Writer	4 February 1989
Ruy de Carvalho	GCM	Actor	1 March 2017
Mário Coelho	ComM	Bullfighter	23 June 2005
Nicolau Breyner	GOM	Actor	9 June 2005
Carlos do Carmo	GOM	Fado singer	3 December 2016
Valentim Loureiro	ComM	Politician	18 September 1989
Raul Nery	ComM	Musician	8 June 2012
Peter Trickett	ComM	Scholar	8 October 2009
Luso-Can Tuna	MHM	Tuna	28 February 2014
Bruno Alves, Eduardo Carvalho, Ricardo Carvalho, William Carvalho, Eder, Eliseu, José Fonte, André Gomes, Raphaël Guerreiro, Anthony Lopes, João Mário, João Moutinho, Nani, Rui Patrício, Pepe, Danilo Pereira, Vieirinha, Ricardo Quaresma, Cristiano Ronaldo, Renato Sanches, Adrien Silva, Rafa Silva, Cédric Soares as UEFA Euro 2016 winners	ComM	Footballers	10 July 2016
Tsanko Arnaudov, Jéssica Augusto, Marisa Barros, Ana Dulce Félix, Vanessa Fernandes, Patrícia Mamona, Sara Moreira	ComM	Athletes	13 July 2016
Fernando Pimenta	ComM	Canoeist	13 July 2016
Salvador Sobral, Luísa Sobral	ComM	Musicians	23 April 2018
Fernando Santos	GOM	Football coach	10 July 2016
Fernanda Freitas	OM	Journalist	10 July 2013
Jim Costa	ComM	Politician	8 June 1996
Andrzej Duda	GCM	Politician	26 February 2009
Antonio Felix da Costa	CommM	Formula E driver	3 September 2020
Percival Noronha	ComM	Historian	1 September 2014
