= COVID-19 pandemic in Portugal =

Aspect of viral disease pandemic

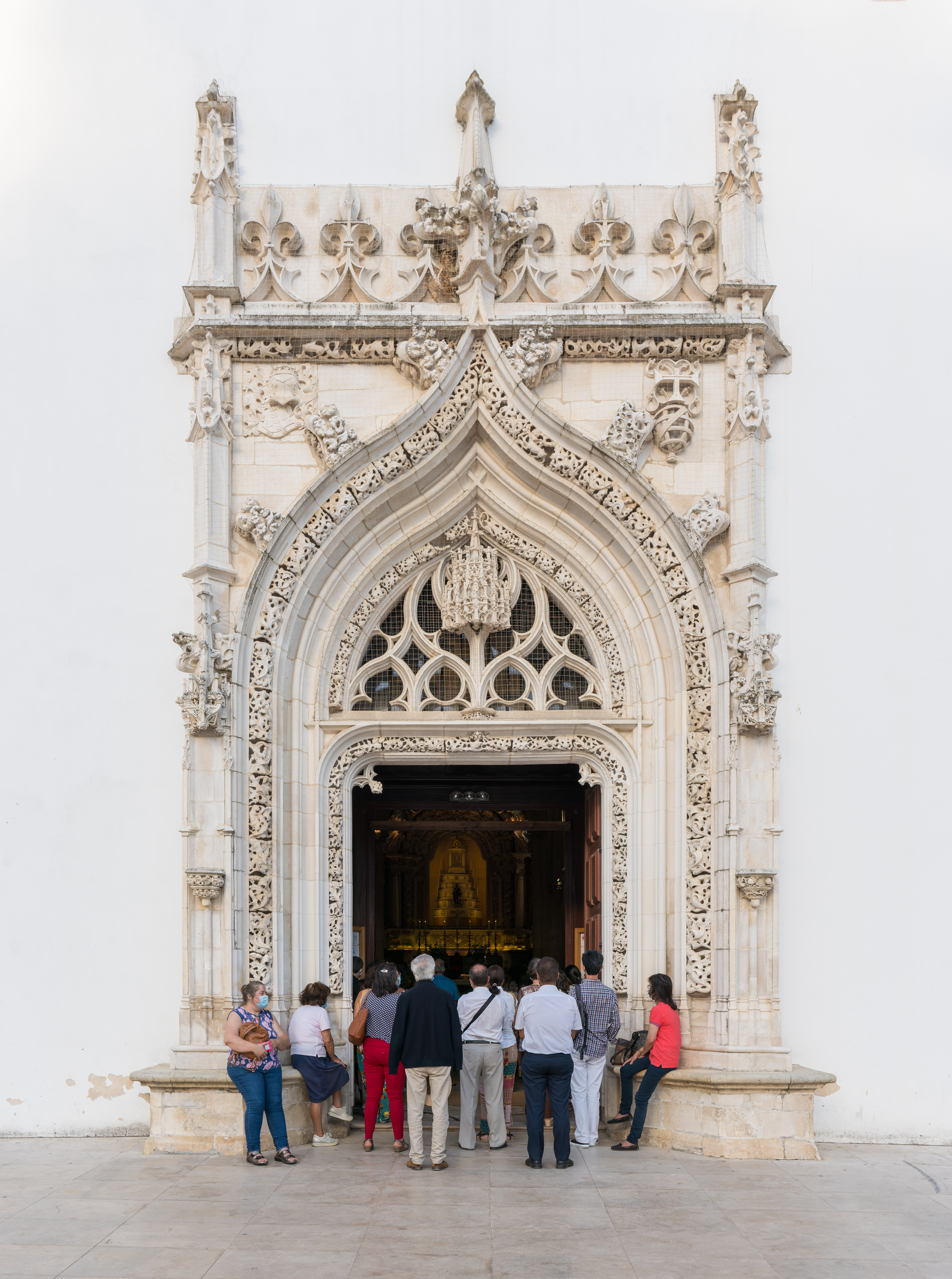
- People watching Mass outside of a church in Tomar due to COVID-19 restrictions, August 2020

- COVID-19 rolling 14-day prevalence in Portuguese boroughs per 100,000 inhabitants, as of February 17, 2022
- Disease: COVID-19
- Pathogen: SARS-CoV-2
- Location: Portugal
- First outbreak: Wuhan, Hubei, China
- Index case: Porto
- Arrival date: 2 March 2020 (6 years, 8 months, 2 weeks and 5 days)
- Confirmed cases: 5,673,129
- Recovered: 5,590,374
- Deaths: 29,663
- Fatality rate: 0.52%
- Vaccinations: 9,821,414 (total vaccinated); 8,909,769 (fully vaccinated); 28,314,796 (doses administered)

Government website
- coronavirus.rr.sapo.pt

The COVID-19 pandemic in Portugal was a part of the pandemic of coronavirus disease 2019 (COVID-19) caused by severe acute respiratory syndrome coronavirus 2 (SARS-CoV-2). On 2 March 2020, the virus was confirmed to have reached the country when it was reported that two men, a 60-year-old doctor who travelled to Northern Italy on vacation and a 33-year-old man working in Spain, tested positive for COVID-19. On 16 March 2020, the first death from COVID-19 was reported in Portugal.

On 11 October 2020, the number of confirmed cases in Portugal exceeded the number of confirmed cases in China. On 19 October 2020, the number of confirmed cases in the country crossed the 100,000-mark. The number of confirmed cases in Portugal also crossed the 200,000-mark on 13 November 2020, the 300,000-mark at the beginning of December 2020, the 400,000-mark on 29 December 2020, the 500,000-mark on 13 January 2021, the 600,000-mark on 22 January 2021, the 700,000-mark on 30 January 2021, the 800,000-mark on 22 February 2021, the 900,000-mark on 9 July 2021 and the one-million-mark on 14 August 2021. On 2 March 2021, the first anniversary of the COVID-19 pandemic in the country was commemorated. It was six days after the number of confirmed cases in Portugal exceeded 800,000.

As of 24 October 2021, Portugal administered about 16.6 million doses; over 9 million people had received at least 1 dose and over 8.86 million people were fully vaccinated, 87% and 86% of eligible population, respectively.

The country underwent five waves of the pandemic, the last one being reported by the DGS in November 2021.

== Background ==
On 12 January 2020, the World Health Organization (WHO) confirmed that a novel coronavirus was the cause of a respiratory illness in a cluster of people in Wuhan, Hubei, China, which was reported to the WHO on 31 December 2019.

The case fatality ratio for COVID-19 has been much lower than SARS of 2003, but the transmission has been significantly greater, with a significant total death toll.

== Timeline ==
=== 2020 ===
==== March ====
- March 2: The first two recorded cases of COVID-19 were confirmed in Portugal.
- March 12: The Portuguese government declared the highest level of alert because of COVID-19 and said it would be maintained until 9 April. Portugal entered a Mitigation Phase as Community transmission was detected.
- March 18: The President of the Republic, Marcelo Rebelo de Sousa, declared the entirety of the Portuguese territory in a State of Emergency for the following fifteen days, with the possibility of renewal, the first since the Carnation Revolution in 1974.
- March 24: The Portuguese Government admitted that the country could not contain the virus any longer.
- March 26: The country entered the "Mitigation Stage". The health care sites dedicated to fighting the disease started including the Portugal Health centres groups (agrupamentos de centros de saúde, ACES).

==== April ====
- April 2: The Parliament approved the extension of the State of Emergency, as requested by the President. The State of Emergency will remain until 17 April, subject to further extensions of similar duration. Under the new regulations, for the Easter traditions, from 9 April (Maundy Thursday) to 13 April (Easter Monday) the Portuguese Government decreed special measures in restricting people movements between municipalities (Portuguese: municípios or concelhos) with very few exceptions, closing all airports to civil transportation and increased control in the national borders.
- April 30: The Portuguese Ministers' Council approved a plan to start releasing the country from the COVID-19 container measures and cancelling the State of Emergency.

==== May ====
- May 2: The State of Emergency was canceled.
- May 4: Portugal started the first phase in easing restrictions. Small street stores reopened (see Response, Return to Normal section).
- May 18: Portugal entered the second phase in easing restrictions. Nurseries and the last two years of the secondary school reopened, along with restaurants, cafés, medium-sized street stores and some museums, all with mandatory usage of mask and distance rules.

==== September ====
- September 15: "state of alert" to nationwide "state of contingency". The decision is thought to prepare the country for the return of students and teachers for the new academic year, the return of workers into the workplace from months of work-from-home policies and for the possible surge of new cases due to the beginning of fall and winter. The following measures were adopted:

- Mandatory domiciliary or hospital confinement for people infected with COVID-19 or subject to active health surveillance.
- Prohibition of gatherings with more than 10 people.
- Prohibition of the consumption of alcoholic beverages in public areas.
- Prohibition of sales of alcoholic beverages in service areas and gas stations.
- General commercial establishments have to be closed at 8 p.m.
- Supermarkets can remain open until 10 p.m, however the sale of alcoholic beverages after 8 p.m is prohibited.
- Restaurants can remain open beyond 8 p.m for local consumption (both in the interior of the commercial establishment or on the outside, where permitted) and for take-away services and home delivery.
- Closing time for the following establishments were not fixed: gas stations (which can remain open 24 hours per day exclusively for the sale of fuel), pharmacies, funeral homes, sports establishments, clinics and medical establishments.

==== October ====
- October 14 : Government declares "state of calamity" due to surge in new cases.

=== 2021 ===
==== January ====
- January 15 : Government reinstates nationwide lockdown due to a surge in new cases.
- January 17 : Portugal registers the highest number of coronavirus cases in Europe per capita over the last seven days, according to Oxford University's ourworldindata.org.
- January 21 : Government declares closure of all schools, kindergartens and universities for at least 15 days. The decision was motivated by the increase in infections caused by the UK SARS-CoV-2 variant.
- January 22: Catholic bishops decide to discontinue the public celebration of Masses, Baptisms, Confirmations, marriages, and other pastoral activities, as of January 23. The Shrine of Our Lady of Fátima has been negatively impacted by the pandemic measures.
- January 23: Portugal registers record number of daily cases (15,333) and the highest number of people in intensive care units (720) since the beginning of the pandemic. Death toll passes the 10,000 mark (10,194).
- January 26: Portugal registers record number of daily deaths (291).

==== March ====
- March 11 : The country launches its second time lockdown for a month. There are now a totaling 813,152 confirmed cases, 16,650 deaths since the pandemic broke out and 793,162 people have taken the vaccination.

April

- Portugal is back to lockdown for the second time since 15 Jan 2021.
- April 22, health authorities reported that the country has a total of 833,397 confirmed cases with 16,957 deaths.

==== November ====
- November 29, it was announced 13 cases of the Omicron coronavirus variant were detected amongst players and staff of top division Lisbon soccer club Belenenses SAD.

==== December ====
- December 1, health authorities ordered all members of Portuguese soccer club C.D. Tondela to go into isolation following a new surge in coronavirus cases in the country.

== Response ==
=== Information access ===
Information about the COVID-19 pandemic in the country is hosted on the DGS home website. However, due to the severity of the pandemic a separate website was created dedicated specifically to coronavirus information and updates under the Portuguese Ministry of Health. Another governmental website was later created to deal with more generic information explaining the emergency status, public information and exceptional measures to help business.

The Ministry of Health provides a web page with information for the public about different areas, including brochures, orientation and guidance for different activity sectors, how to deal with self-isolation, and quarantine games for children. As an example there are several Portuguese food recipes with canned food.

=== Hospitals for COVID-19 ===
The following is a list of the front line COVID-19 hospitals.

Region	Hospital	Adults	Pediatric
Northern	Braga		
Northern	Santo António		
Northern	São João		
Northern	Pedro Hispano		
Central	CHU Coimbra		
Central	ULS Guarda		
Lisbon and Tagus Valley	Santa Maria		
Lisbon and Tagus Valley	Curry Cabral		
Lisbon and Tagus Valley	Dona Estefânia		
Algarve	Faro		
Madeira	Dr. Nélio Mendonça		
Azores	Santo Espírito (Terceira)		

=== Fiscal Policy Response ===
In 2020, Portugal allocated €600 million per month to financial support for workers furloughed by their employers. Roughly €1.3 billion were allocated to incentivize a gradual reopening and return to economic activity, and €13 billion in lines of credit were extended to small and mid-size businesses. Tax and Social Security Contribution deferrals totaling €7.9 billion for companies and employees were enacted. The APOIAR Program was introduced, extending €.8 billion in loans to small businesses. As of March 12, an additional €296 million were allocated to improving the capacity of the National Health System.

The 2021 budget includes extension of support for businesses, including assistance with non-housing rents for some firms, with subsidies of up to 50% of rent being granted. Large companies in sectors of the economy hurt by the pandemic, namely the tourism sector, received €750 billion in loans and subsidies. On August 2, 2021, support available for businesses forced to remain closed via the APOIAR program was increased, with small businesses whose income declined by more than 50% being eligible for €41,250 in financial support. Moreover, a moratorium on repayment of business loans lasting six months was enacted, and subsequently extended until September 2021. In April, Portugal presented the Recovery and Resiliency Plan to the European commission, including €14 billion in grants and €2.7 billion in loans. The European Commission approved Portugal's Recovery and Resilience plan, adopting a positive assessment of the plan. As of May, the Portuguese government has announced a €6 billion plan to reactivate the tourism industry.

=== Return to normal ===
On April 30, 2020, the Portuguese Ministers' Council approved a plan to start releasing the country from COVID-19 containment measures and cancel the State of Emergency. The plan was divided in three stages, beginning respectively on 4 May, 24 May and 1 June 2020.

The first stage eased some restrictions, such as:

- Barbers and hair salons are open but with health restrictions, mask usage and only by appointment
- Small shops with less than 200m2 can open but cannot have more than 5 customers/100m2 and all must use masks
- People can use public transportation if they are not able to work remotely. Transport vehicles can only be filled to two thirds capacity and all passengers must use a mask
- All public services are open to everyone with an appointment and is an obligation the use of a mask
- Physical exercise can only be done outdoors or at home
- Libraries and Archives are open
- Groups of more than 10 people are not allowed

== Impact ==
Due to movement restrictions imposed by the state of emergency started in March 18 and the adoption of government guidelines on social distancing by the Portuguese people, otherwise highly populated streets and destinations in cities like Lisbon and Porto were completely empty.

=== LGBT+ youth ===
A study by the Faculdade de Psicologia e de Ciências da Educação da Universidade do Porto (FPCEUP) aimed at "assessing the psychological health and social support networks" of LGBT+ young people who live with their parental figures during the COVID-19 pandemic concluded, based on a survey of 632 young LGBT+ people, who most did not feel comfortable in their families during confinement.

Of the people surveyed, 59% said they were uncomfortable in the family and three out of 10 felt "quite uncomfortable" living at home with parents during social confinement.

In addition, 35% of young people felt "suffocated" because they were unable to express their identity within the family, whereas in the case of young people whose family was aware of their identity, 35% stated that they "deal badly or very badly" thereby.

This study, with a longitudinal and intercultural character, also concluded that six out of 10 participants considered that the pandemic had "greatly" affected their lives.

With regard to social support networks, half of the young people admitted to feeling isolated from their friends and 35% "extremely isolated" from their partners.

"As for the present study, if for some young people the covid-19 pandemic had no impact on their social support networks, an important proportion felt quite isolated from their friends", says FPCEUP.

== Vaccination ==
Formation patch of the Military Staff of the Task Force Coordinator (Portuguese: Estado-Maior do Coordenador da Task Force) worn by members of the task force

The Portuguese government appointed a task force on 18 November 2020 to develop the COVID-19 vaccination plan. The COVID-19 Vaccination Plan Task Force was formalised on 23 November 2020. It was led by Francisco Ramos, former Undersecretary of State and Health, and composed of military personnel, technicians from the Shared Services of the Ministry of Health (SPMS), the Directorate-General of Health and Infarmed. In 30 days, on 18 December, the task force presented the plan, which divided the vaccination into three phases, according to the priority of the people to be vaccinated.

Portugal began vaccination on 27 December, followed by vaccination of healthcare professionals directly in contact with COVID patients. The first Portuguese to be vaccinated was António Sarmento, director of the infectious diseases department at the Hospital de São João. Its vaccination program stood out internationally as Portugal was one of the countries with the highest percentage of vaccinated population: with data as of 11 October 2021 88% of the country's total population has received the first dose. At the end of September 2021, Portugal had reached one of highest levels of COVID-19 vaccination within the European Union.

=== Vaccine donations to former colonies ===
Portugal announced that it would distribute 5% of its vaccine doses to a group of former colonies in Africa and to the nation of East Timor. Portugal is entitled to 35 million vaccine doses in 2021. Donating 5% of its stock means the country would give 1.75 million doses of the COVID-19 vaccine to Angola, Mozambique, Cape Verde, Guinea Bissau, Equatorial Guinea, São Tomé and Príncipe, and East Timor. So far, they have committed to donate 1 million doses starting in July 2021.

== Statistics ==
COVID-19 Summary (12/4/2024)
Total confirmed cases	5,643,062 (+2,216)
Total confirmed deaths	28,126 (+14)
Active cases	219
Under surveillance	77,283 (+1,204)
Recovered	4,237,853 (+1,408)
Currently admitted to hospital	948 (+37)
Currently admitted to ICU	135 (+1)
Cases per 100 000 (national/continental)	410.4 / 413.9
R(t) (national/continental)	1.1 / 1.11

Vaccine summary (14/11/2021)
People with at least one vaccine dose	9 053 901 (87%)
People completely vaccinated	8 925 907 (86%)
Doses received	23 017 910
Doses distributed	17 211 348

Vaccination by age group
	At least one vaccine dose	Complete vaccination
0–17	562 026 (90%)	542 632 (87%)
18–24	729 806 (93%)	709 115 (91%)
25–49	3 203 605 (96%)	3 142 142 (94%)
50–64	2 171 685 (100%)	2 153 029 (99%)
65–79	1 689 071 (100%)	1 683 474 (100%)
⩾80	697 198 (100%)	695 354 (100%)

The following graphs show the evolution of the pandemic starting from 2 March 2020, the day the first cases were confirmed in the country.

=== Total confirmed cases by age and gender ===
The following chart displays the proportion of total cases by age and gender on August 20, 2021.

=== Severe cases ===
==== Total confirmed deaths by age and gender ====
The following chart displays the proportion of total deaths by age and gender on December 6, 2021.

=== Confirmed cases and deaths, by region ===
The following graph shows the daily cases of COVID-19 for each region of Portugal (updated on the 10th of June) according to DGS visualising the table above.

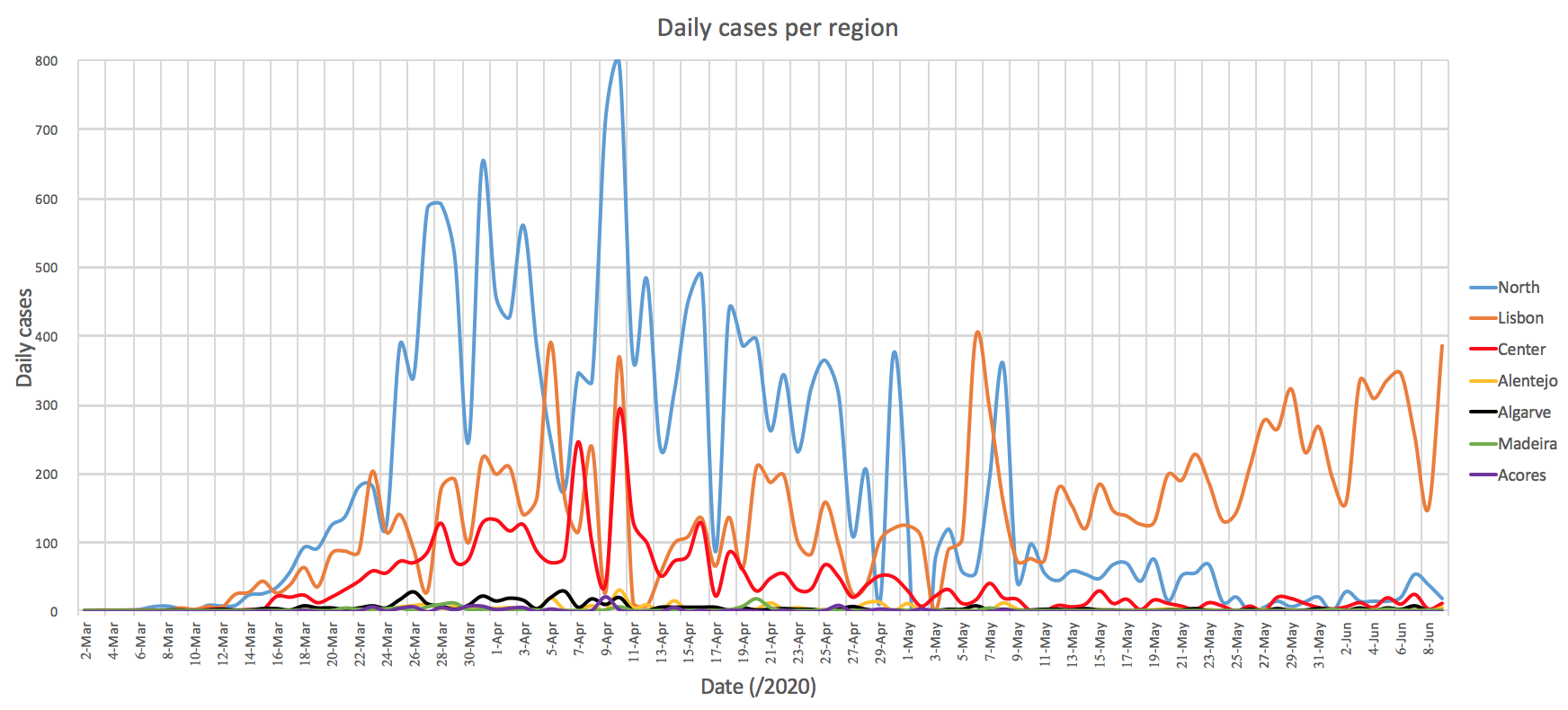
Daily cases of COVID-19 per region in Portugal. The lines are smoothed for better visualisation and are coloured according to each region of Portugal. The negative values are not shown here for better visualisation.

Similarly, the following graph presents the daily deaths by COVID-19 for each region of Portugal (updated on the 10th of June) according to DGS.

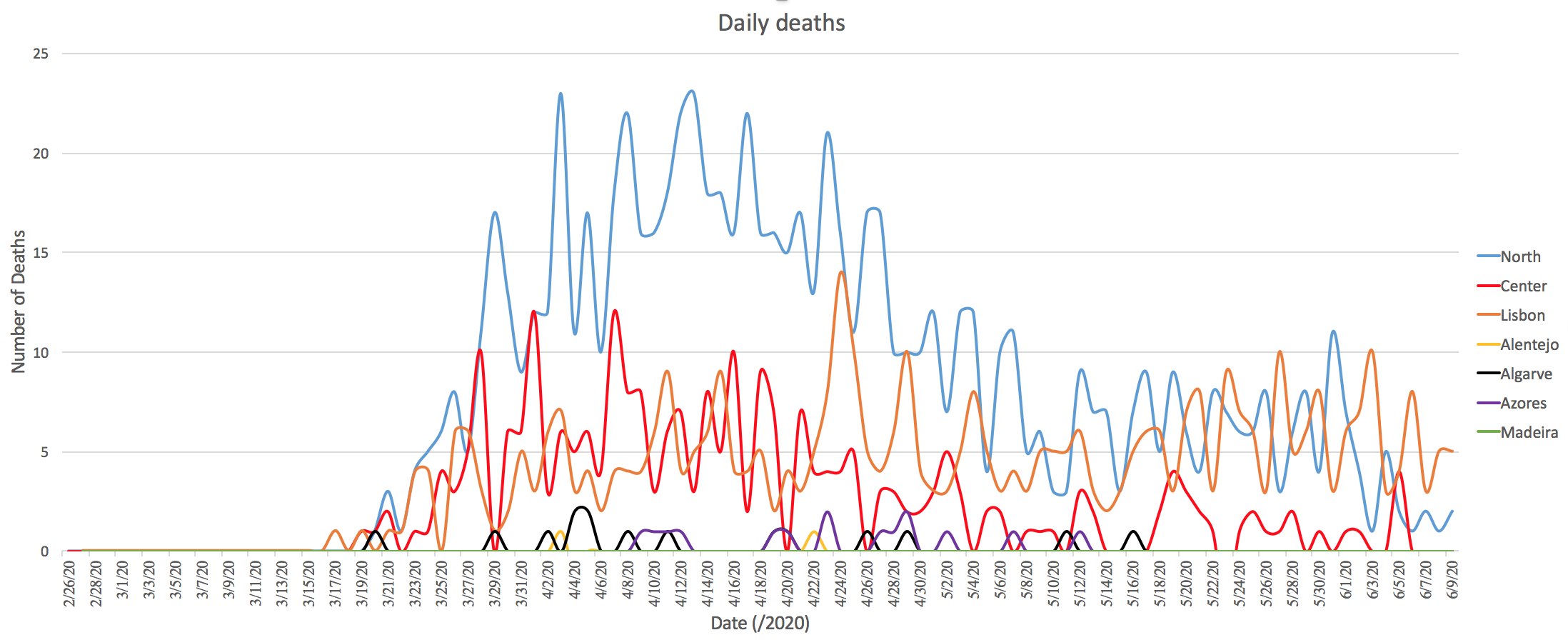
Daily deaths from COVID-19 per region in Portugal. The lines are smoothed for better visualisation and are coloured according to each region of Portugal. The negative values are not shown here for better visualisation.

=== Growth of cases by Municipalities ===
The following graph presents the total number of COVID-19 cases per day for the municipalities of Portugal with more than 1000 confirmed cases (updated on 30 May), according to the Data Science for Social Good Portugal.

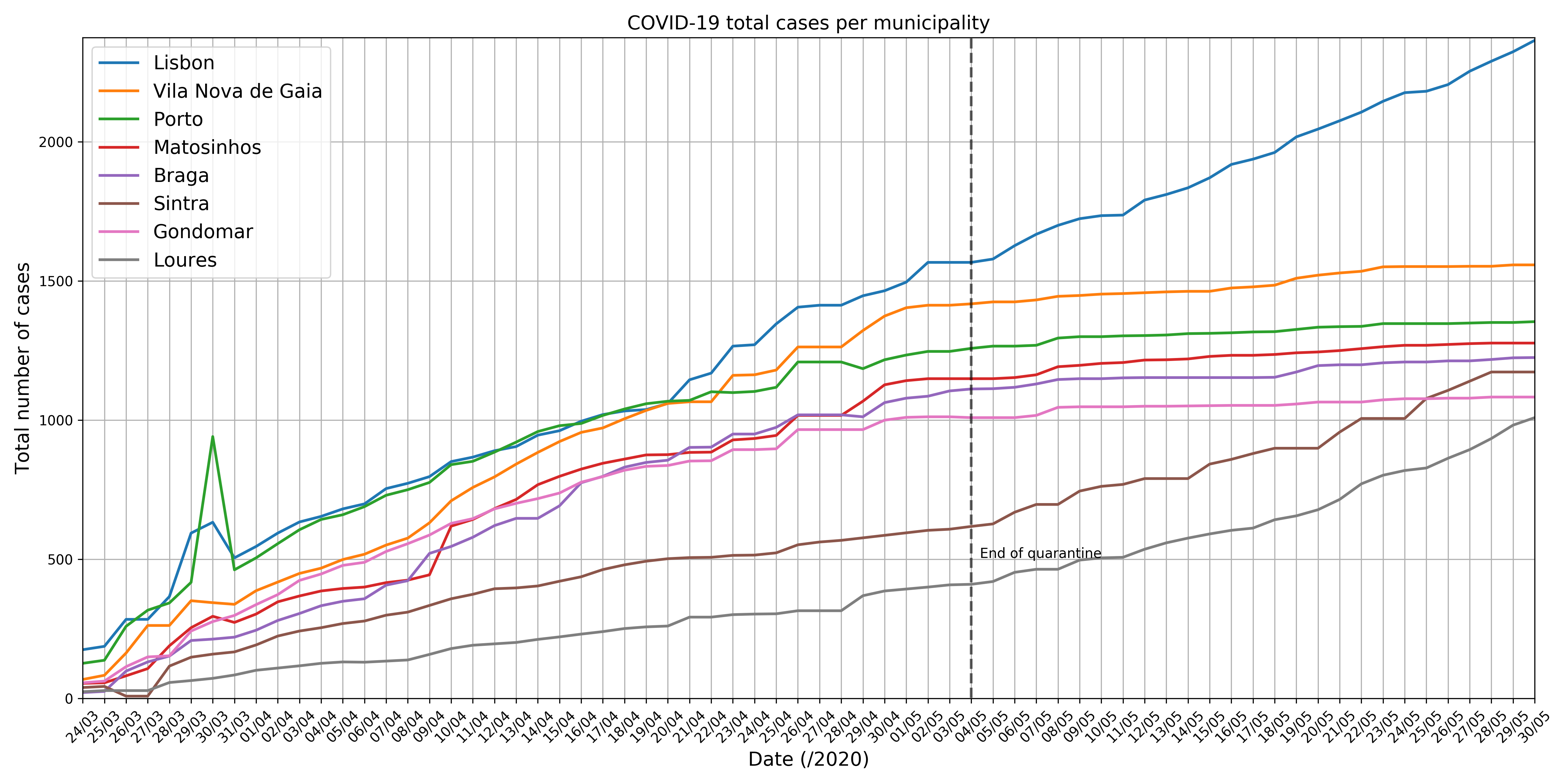
The total number of COVID-19 cases per municipality for those municipalities with more than 1000 confirmed cases. The legend shows which municipality corresponds to which coloured line in the graph and the vertical black line denotes the 4th of May 2020 as the end of the quarantine state.

=== 2009–20 deaths cases comparison ===
According to the Portuguese mortality surveillance (EVM), the following chart presents the total number of deaths per day in Portugal for the years 2009–2020 (updated on 10 June).

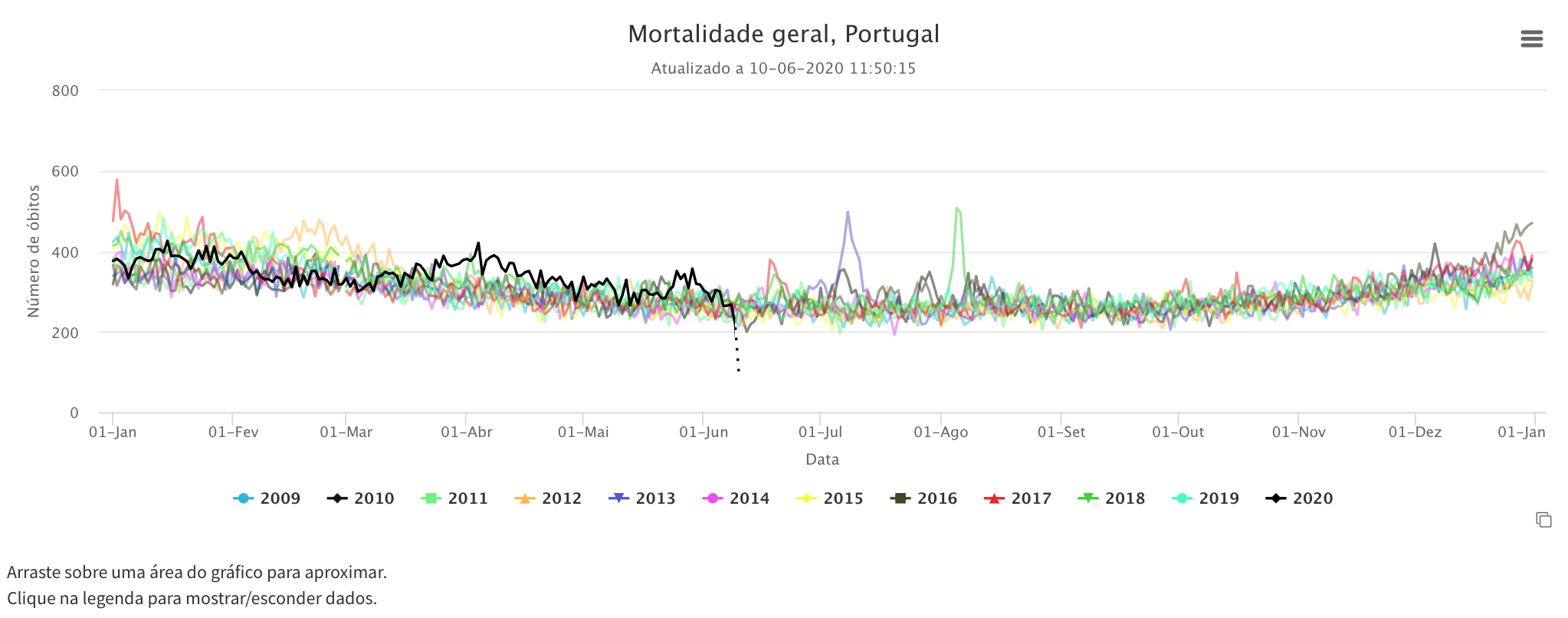
The total number of deaths per day in Portugal for various years including all ages.

In the following two graphs, the total deaths per day and by age group are presented for the years 2019 and 2020.

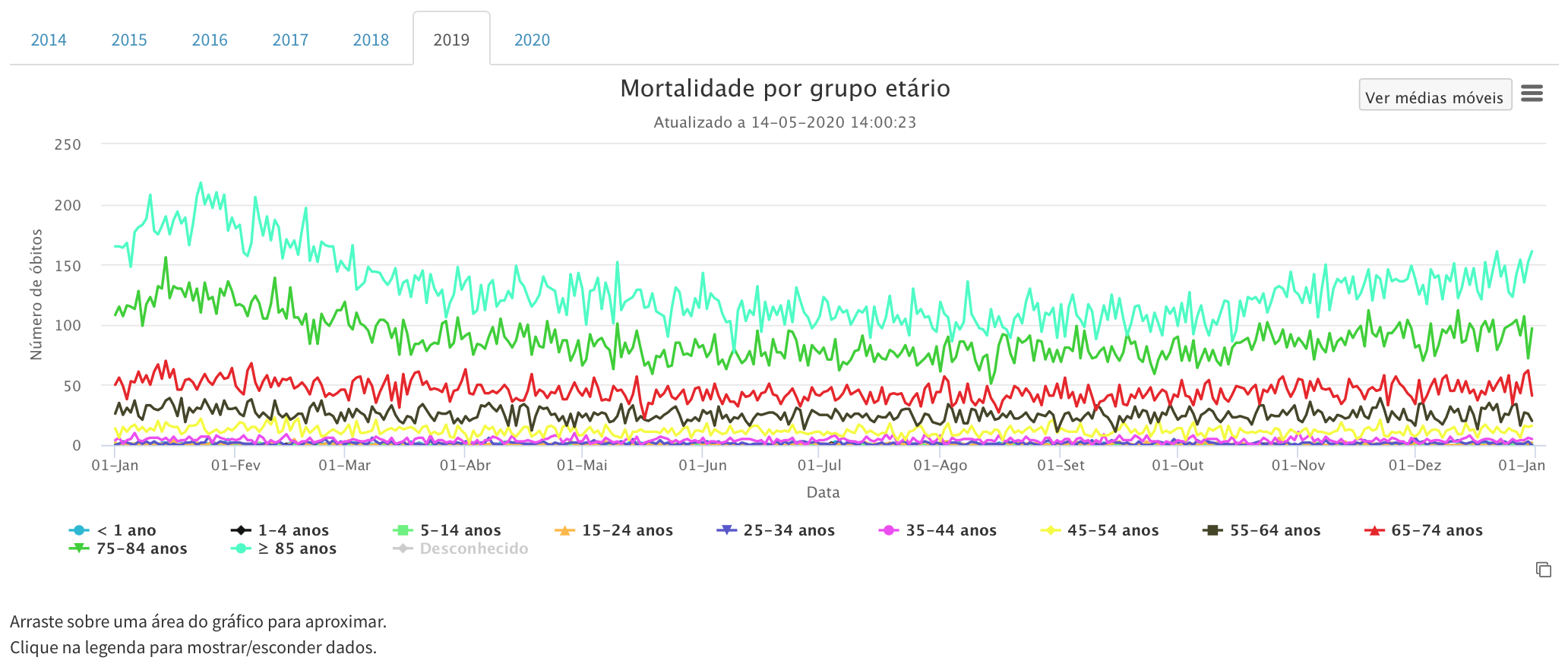
Total number of deaths per day for Portugal per age group for the year 2019.

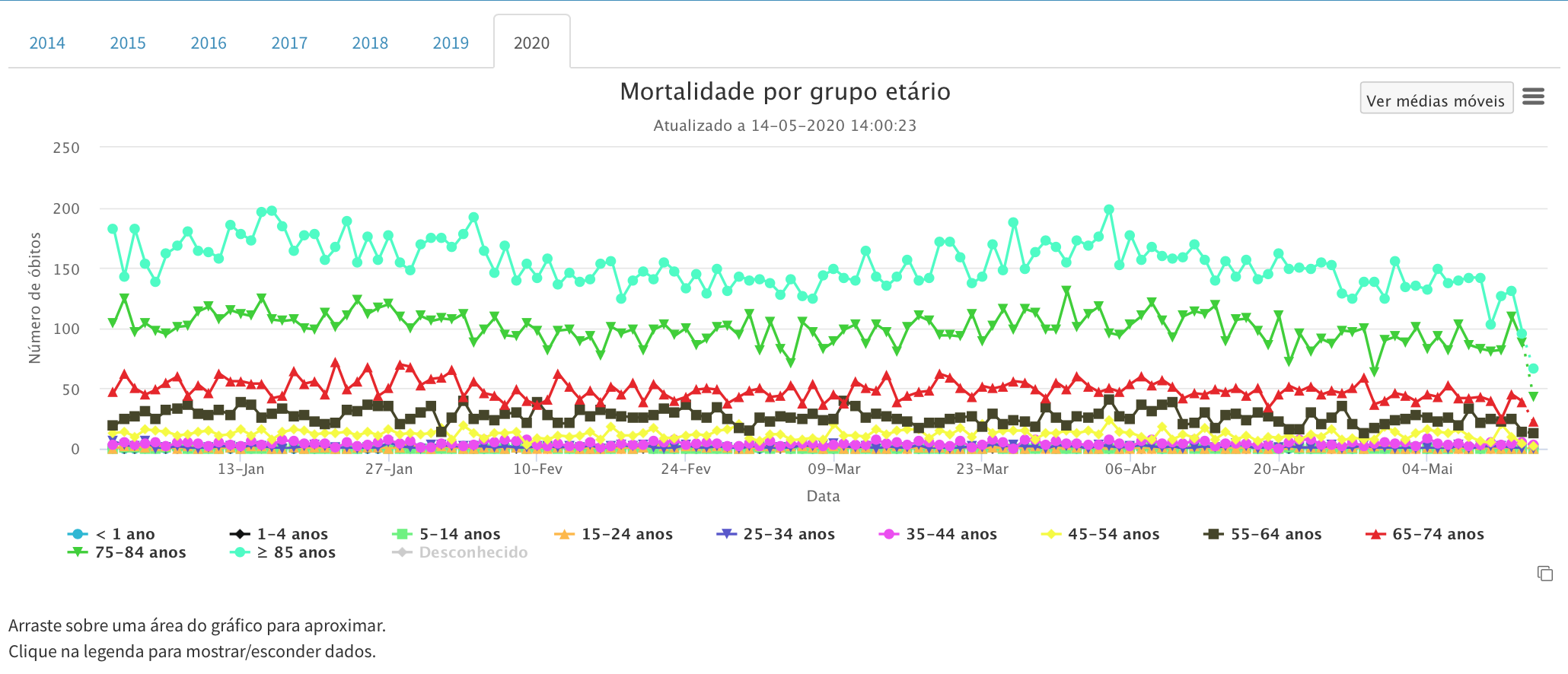
Total number of deaths per day for Portugal per age group for the year 2020.

== See also ==
- COVID-19 pandemic in Europe
- COVID-19 pandemic by country and territory
