= Paulo Macedo =

Portuguese business manager

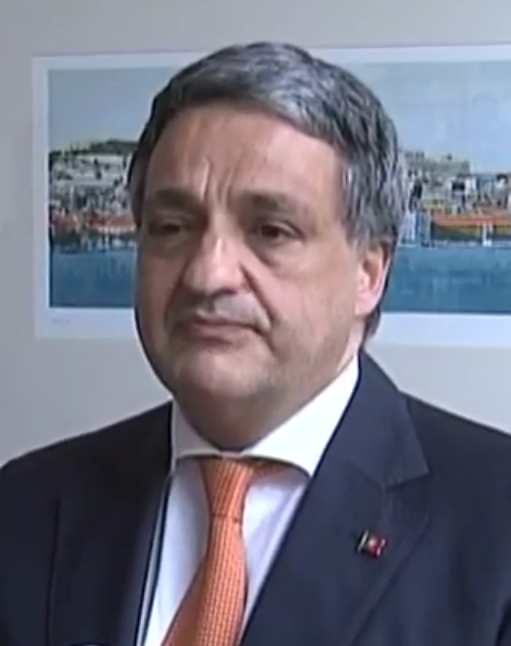
- Paulo Macedo in 2014

CEO of Caixa Geral de Depósitos
- Incumbent
- Assumed office 1 February 2017
- Preceded by: António Domingues

Minister of Health
- In office 21 June 2011 – 30 October 2015
- Prime Minister: Pedro Passos Coelho
- Preceded by: Ana Jorge
- Succeeded by: Fernando Leal da Costa

Personal details
- Born: Paulo José Ribeiro Moita de Macedo; 14 July 1963 (age 63) Lisbon, Portugal
- Party: Independent
- Spouse: Filomena Maria Cambraia dos Santos
- Children: 2
- Education: Technical University of Lisbon
- Occupation: Business manager • Politician

Paulo José Ribeiro Moita de Macedo (born 14 July 1963) is a Portuguese business manager and politician. He is the CEO of Caixa Geral de Depósitos since 2017. He was the Health Minister of Portugal from 2011 to 2015, in the XIX Constitutional Government led by Pedro Passos Coelho and general director of taxation and chairman of the Fiscal Administration Board (2004–2007).

== Biography ==
He holds a degree in corporate organisation and management, by the Technical University of Lisbon (1986). PADE – Programa de Alta Direção de Empresas (Top Management Program), AESE (2003). Several Executive Formations (MIT, Harvard Business School, INSEAD, IMD) in several countries.
