= Adalberto Campos Fernandes =

Portuguese politician

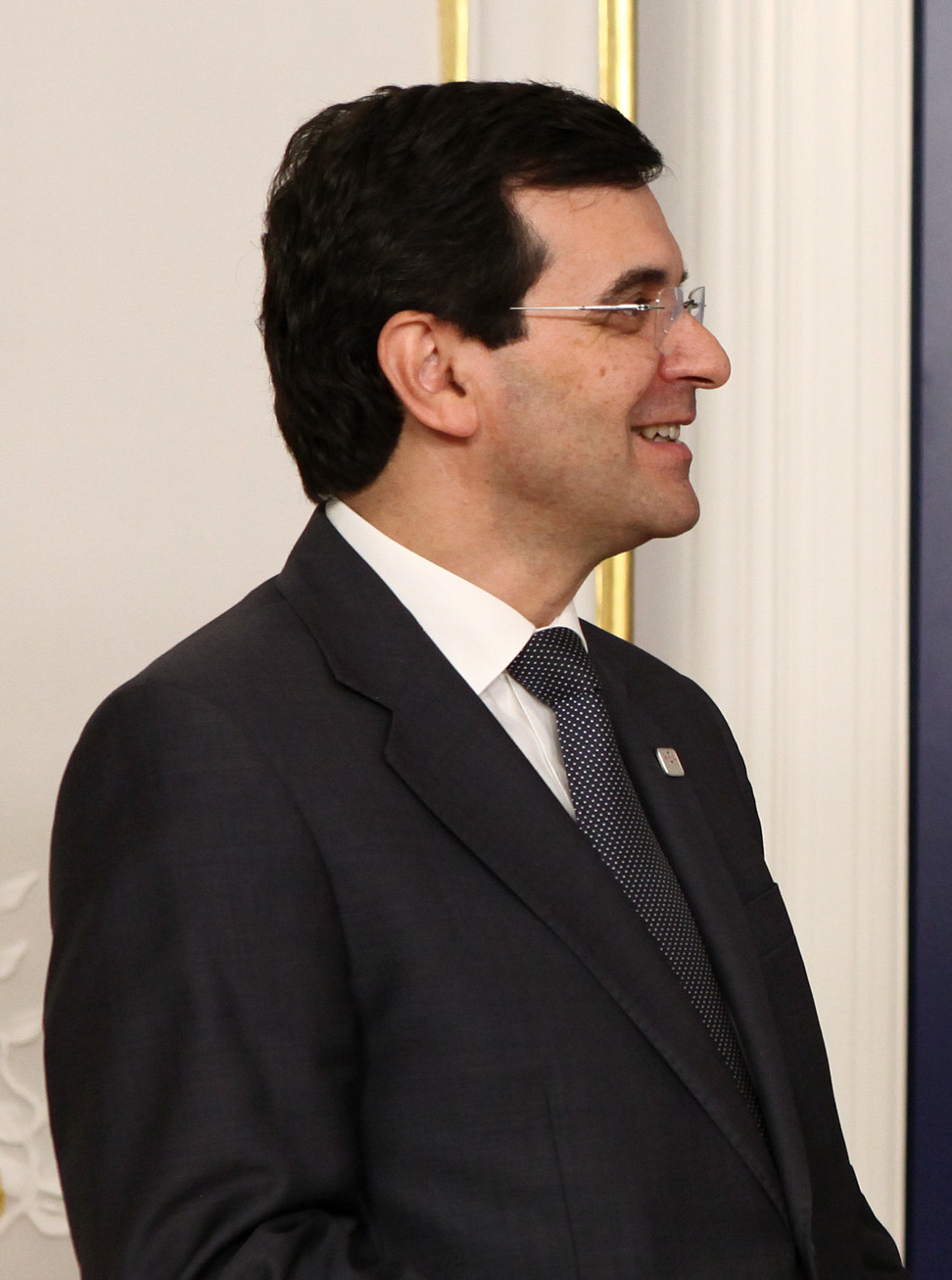

Minister of Health
- In office 26 November 2015 – 15 October 2018
- Prime Minister: António Costa
- Preceded by: Fernando Leal da Costa
- Succeeded by: Marta Temido

Personal details
- Born: 1958 (age 67–68) Lisbon, Portugal

Adalberto Campos Fernandes (born 1958) is a Portuguese politician who served as Minister of Health from 26 November 2015 to 15 October 2018. He graduated with a PhD in health administration from the University of Lisbon and is a professor at the New University of Lisbon.
