= Ministry of Health (Portugal) =

Government ministry of Portugal

- Ministério da Saúde
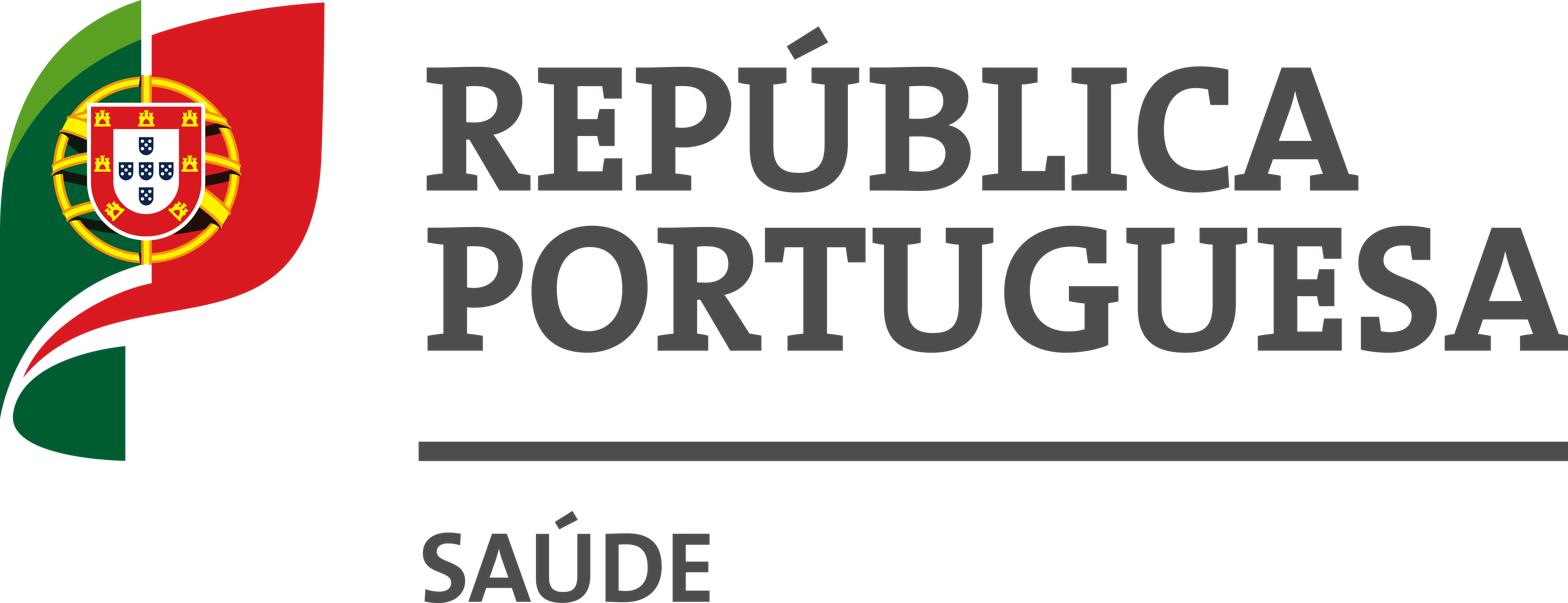

Ministry overview
- Formed: 1958
- Jurisdiction: Government of Portugal
- Headquarters: Lisbon
- Minister responsible: Ana Paula Martins, Minister of Health
- Website: www.sns.gov.pt/institucional/ministerio-da-saude/

The Ministry of Health (Portuguese: Ministério da Saúde) is a Portuguese government ministry. The minister is Ana Paula Martins, she is a pharmacist and a politician. Her deputies are Cristina Vaz Tomé and Ana Povo.

== List of ministers ==
Colour key
(for political parties)
Socialist Party (PS)
Social Democratic Party (PSD)
Independent (Ind.)

#	Portrait	Name	Took office	Left office	Party	Prime Minister
1		António Maldonado Gonelha (1935–2022)	9 June 1983	6 November 1985	PS	Mário Soares
2		Leonor Beleza (b. 1948)	6 November 1985	5 January 1990	PSD	Aníbal Cavaco Silva
3		Arlindo de Carvalho (b. 1945)	5 January 1990	7 December 1993	PSD	Aníbal Cavaco Silva
4		Paulo Mendo (1932–2025)	7 December 1993	28 October 1995	PSD	Aníbal Cavaco Silva
5		Maria de Belém Roseira (b. 1949)	28 October 1995	25 October 1999	PS	António Guterres
6		Manuela Arcanjo (b. 1954)	25 October 1999	3 July 2001	PS	António Guterres
7		António Correia de Campos (b. 1942)	3 July 2001	6 April 2002	PS	António Guterres
8		Luís Filipe Pereira (b. 1944)	6 April 2002	12 March 2005	PSD	José Manuel Durão Barroso
8		Luís Filipe Pereira (b. 1944)	6 April 2002	12 March 2005	PSD	Pedro Santana Lopes
9		António Correia de Campos (b. 1942)	12 March 2005	30 January 2008	PS	José Sócrates
10		Ana Jorge (b. 1949)	30 January 2008	21 June 2011	PS	José Sócrates
11		Paulo Macedo (b. 1963)	21 June 2011	30 October 2015	Ind.	Pedro Passos Coelho
12		Fernando Leal da Costa (b. 1959)	30 October 2015	26 November 2015	Ind.	Pedro Passos Coelho
13		Adalberto Campos Fernandes (b. 1958)	26 November 2015	15 October 2018	PS	António Costa
14		Marta Temido (b. 1974)	15 October 2018	10 September 2022	PS	António Costa
15		Manuel Pizarro (b. 1964)	10 September 2022	2 April 2024	PS	António Costa
16		Ana Paula Martins (b. 1965)	2 April 2024	Incumbent	PSD	Luís Montenegro

== Controversy ==
In June 2024, police raided the ministry (and the country's largest hospital) in an investigation into whether officials broke laws by giving preferential access to a costly medical treatment to baby twins whose family had sought help from the president. The parliamentary opposition, Chega, has criticized the health ministry over the issue and set up a parliamentary committee to look into the case.

== See also ==
- Healthcare in Portugal
