= Maria de Fátima Montemor =

Portuguese scientist

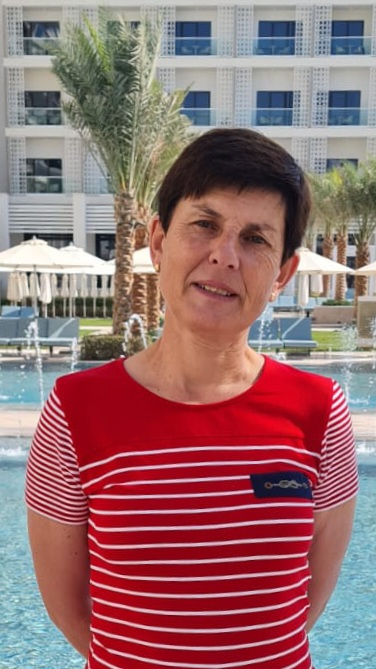
- Education: Instituto Superior Técnico; Technical University of Lisbon

Maria de Fátima Montemor is a Portuguese researcher known for her work in coatings for surface protection and functionality, and materials for electrodes for electrochemical energy storage devices. She is a full professor at Instituto Superior Técnico.

== Education and career ==
Montemor graduated from the Instituto Superior Técnico (Technical University of Lisbon) in 1989. She went on to complete her PhD in chemical engineering in 1995. In 2003 she started her research career at the Department of Chemical Engineering as an assistant researcher. In 2011, Montemor became an assistant professor and reached the position of associate professor in 2015. In 2017 she got her "Agregação" title in Chemical Engineering and started her teaching activity as a full professor in 2018. As of 2021 she is a full professor Department of Chemical Engineering and a researcher at Centro de Química Estrutural.

== Research ==
Montemore is known for her work in the field of surface functionalization strategies and development of coatings, including smart self-healing coatings for improved performance of metallic parts (steels, Mg, Zn and Al alloys).

== Selected publications ==
- Montemor, M.F; Simões, A.M.P; Ferreira, M.G.S (2003). "Chloride-induced corrosion on reinforcing steel: from the fundamentals to the monitoring techniques". Cement and Concrete Composites. 25 (4–5): 491–502. doi:10.1016/s0958-9465(02)00089-6. hdl:10773/31566. ISSN 0958-9465.
- Montemor, M.F.; Pinto, R.; Ferreira, M.G.S. (2009). "Chemical composition and corrosion protection of silane films modified with CeO2 nanoparticles". Electrochimica Acta. 54 (22): 5179–5189. doi:10.1016/j.electacta.2009.01.053. ISSN 0013-4686.
- Montemor, M.F. (2014). "Functional and smart coatings for corrosion protection: A review of recent advances". Surface and Coatings Technology. 258: 17–37. doi:10.1016/j.surfcoat.2014.06.031. ISSN 0257-8972.
- Montemor, Maria Fatima (2015-11-12). Smart Composite Coatings and Membranes: Transport, Structural, Environmental and Energy Applications. Elsevier Science. ISBN 978-1-78242-283-9.

== Awards and honors ==
She was awarded the BES innovation prize in 2013, and the European Corrosion Medal 2019 for her work in coatings for corrosion protection and corrosion science. In 2021, she received the degree of Doctor "Honoris Causa" from the University of Mons for her work in the domain of coatings for surface protection and functionalization.
