= Pedro Silva Girão =

Portuguese engineer, professor, and researcher

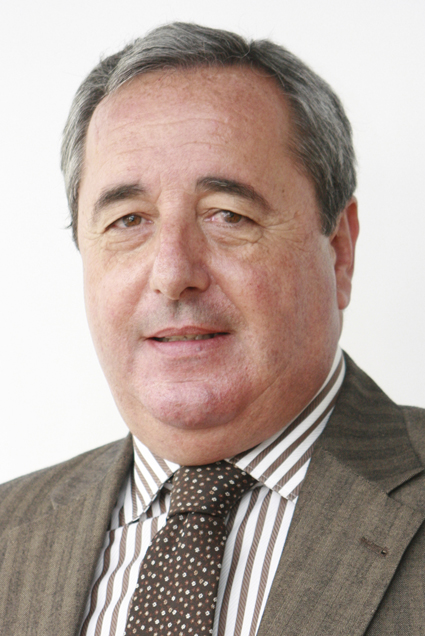
Pedro Silva Girão

Pedro Manuel Brito da Silva Girão, (Portuguese pronunciation: [ˈpeðɾu mɐnuˈɛl ˈβɾitu ðɐ ˈsilvɐ ʒiˈɾɐ̃w]; born 27 February 1952) is a Portuguese engineer, professor, and researcher whose main interest is metrology.

Appointed by Universidade de Lisboa, he serves as Deputy Dean of ULisboa School, Shanghai University, since January 2023.

== Family ==
Pedro Silva Girão was born in Lisbon, Portugal, as the youngest of four sons of José da Silva Girão Júnior (1904-1978) and Arlete de Oliveira Brito da Silva Girão (1912-1993). His elder brother, José António Brito da Silva Girão (1938-2024), held a degree in Agronomic Engineering from Instituto Superior de Agronomia (ISA) of the former Technical University of Lisbon, now University of Lisbon and a PhD in economy from Cornell University. His two sisters, Maria Teresa Brito da Silva Girão Sampaio Soares (born 1939) and Maria Margarida Brito da Silva Girão (born 1945) have degrees in social service and psychology, respectively.

Pedro Silva Girão is married to Cornelia Silva Girão (born in 1957), who has a degree in Automation and Computer Engineering from the Universitatea Tehnică „Gheorghe Asachi” din Iaşi, and a degree in Management from the Universitatea “Alexandru Ioan Cuza” din Iaşi, Iași, Romania

== Academic degrees ==
Pedro Silva Girão has a degree in electrical engineering (1975) from Instituto Superior Técnico (IST) of the former Technical University of Lisbon, now University of Lisbon. In 1988, he earned a PhD in electrical and computer engineering from the same school. In 1995, he received from IST the title Agregação (Habilitation), also in electrical and computer engineering.

== Professional activity ==
=== Teaching ===
Retired in 2022, Pedro Silva Girão was with the Department of Electrical and Computer Engineering (DEEC) of IST since 1974, first as a monitor (1974-1975) and, from 2007, as a full professor. At IST, he taught courses on applied electromagnetism, electronics, electrical measurements, sensors and transducers, and automated measuring systems for undergraduate and graduate students.

From 1993 to 2015, he lectured a course on technology and electrical measurements at Escola Naval.

=== Research ===
Pedro Silva Girão started his research activity in 1975 at the now extinguished Centro de Electrotecnia da Universidade Técnica de Lisboa (1975-1994) and later at Centro de Electrotecnia Teórica e Medidas Eléctricas do Instituto Superior Técnico (1994-1998).

In 1997, he integrated a group that created the Instrumentation and Measurement Group (GIM) at Instituto de Telecomunicações (IT). At IT, he is a Senior Researcher.

In the broad domain of metrology, his main interests include instrumentation, transducers, measurement techniques, and digital data processing, particularly for biomedical and environmental applications. Metrology, quality, and electromagnetic compatibility are also areas of regular activity.

== Other interests ==
=== Maria Inês de Menezes Vaz de Sampaio Foundation ===
He is the President of Maria Inês de Menezes Vaz de Sampaio Foundation. The Foundation, created by Dr. Victor Hugo Traveiro Franco in honor of his wife, is a non-for-profit institution that helps financially needy students of high performance by granting scholarships that enable them the frequency of pre-defined university courses.

=== Sports ===
Passionate about all sports, Pedro Silva Girão practiced several of them as an amateur: football, handball (he was in the team that won the 1988 Portuguese Army Championship and was runner-up at the 1988 Portuguese Armed Forced Championship), basketball, volleyball, table tennis, skiing, snowboarding, surfing, windsurfing, kitesurfing, and tennis.

He started playing bridge in the early 1970s. Dedicated to the game for more than 20 years, he won tens of national events, with emphasis on the Portuguese National Pairs Championship in 1983-1984 (with António Santos Serra), a Portuguese National Teams Championship (with António Santos Serra, Manuel d'Orey Capucho, Nuno Guimarães, José Miguel Saraiva, and António Oliveira Monteiro), and in 1984-1985 (with Jorge Monteiro dos Santos, José Galvão Lucas, Francisco Costa Cabral, Rui Silva Santos, and António Santos Serra). He played for Portugal in the 4th European Youth Championships 1974, Copenhagen, Denmark (with António Oliveira Monteiro, Luís Folque, Carlos Galvão Lucas, José Galvão Lucas, and António Vitória Lopes) and in the 6th World Bridge Olympiad 1980, Valkenburg, Netherlands (with Jorge Monteiro dos Santos, Rui Silva Santos, Miguel Ascenção, Manuel Oliveira, and António Santos Serra).

He was a member of the Direction of Clube de Ténis do Estoril (Estoril Tennis Club) and of Federação Portuguesa de Bridge (Portuguese Bridge Federation).

== Honors and distinctions ==
- Doctor Honoris Causa, Faculty of Electrical Engineering, Technical University “Gheorghe Asachi”, Iasi, Romania, April 2009.
- Fellow of The Institution of Engineering and Technology (IET), since July 2018.
- World Top 2% Scientists (Career Impact) (1960-2022), Stanford University, https://elsevier.digitalcommonsdata.com/datasets/btchxktzyw/4
- Honorary Chairman IMEKO Technical Committee on Environmental Measurement (TC-19).
- Membro Conselheiro of Ordem dos Engenheiros, since 2012.
- IEEE Instrumentation and Measurement Society Distinguished Lecturer, 2015-2018.
