= Tecnologia =

- Full name: Tecnologia
- League: Campeonato Nacional de Rugby II Divisão
Team kit

Tecnologia is a rugby team based in Lisbon, Portugal. In the 2012/13 season, they played in the Second Division of the Campeonato Nacional de Rugby (National Championship). The team is the official rugby team of the Faculdade de Ciências e Tecnologia da Universidade Nova de Lisboa at the Universidade Nova de Lisboa. By the 2023/24 season they were no longer in that division.

They do not appear on Portugal Rugby's list of clubs.
