= CEJ =

CEJ may refer to:

- Cementoenamel junction
- Chernihiv Shestovitsa Airport
- Coastal Engineering Journal, a publication by World Scientific
- CE Johansson AB, the parent firm established by Carl Edvard Johansson
