= Tecnico =

Tecnico may refer to:

- Instituto Superior Técnico, the school of engineering of the University of Lisbon;
- Club Deportivo Técnico Universitario, an Ecuadorian association football team;
- A lucha libre term for a 'good guy' in wrestling; see face.
