= Alfredo Bruto da Costa =

Portuguese politician (1938–2016)

- Born: 5 August 1938; Margão, Goa, Portuguese India
- Died: 11 November 2016 (aged 78); Lisbon, Portugal
- Occupation: Politician

Alfredo Bruto da Costa (5 August 1938 – 11 November 2016) was a Portuguese politician. He served as Minister for Health and Social Welfare in the Government of Prime Minister Maria de Lourdes Pintasilgo, 1979–80. From 2008, he served as president of the Portuguese Economic and Social Council. He was President of National Commission for Justice and Peace from 2008 to 2014 and a member of the Council of State between September 2014 and January 2016.

== Biography ==
Alfredo Bruto da Costa was born in Goa in the former Portuguese India. He was the son of António Anastásio Bruto da Costa, who led a group also known as the "Círculo de Margão" (Margão Circle), which wanted greater autonomy for Goa from Portugal during the Portuguese Second Republic.

Bruto da Costa graduated in engineering from the IST Instituto Superior Técnico of the Technical University of Lisbon and completed a Doctorate in Social Sciences from the University of Bath, UK, with a thesis entitled The Paradox of Poverty – Portugal, 1980-1989. He taught at the Catholic University of Portugal (UCP), the School of Economics and Management (ISEG, Instituto Superior de Economia e Gestão) and the Institute of Labour Sciences (ISCTE, Instituto Superior de Ciências do Trabalho e Emprego) on the subject of poverty and social exclusion, social problems and social policy.
