= Fernando Vasco Costa =

Portuguese civil engineer

- Born: 1913; Lisbon, Portugal
- Died: 20 October 1996 (aged 82–83)
- Education: Instituto Superior Técnico
- Known for: Contributions to the theory and practice of ship berthing and mooring; Design of maritime structures; Port engineering research
- Awards: Manuel Rocha Research Prize (1985); National Academy of Engineering Foreign Associate (1989); Professor Vasco Costa Scholarship (1993)
- Scientific career
- Fields: Civil engineering; Port engineering
- Workplaces: Instituto Superior Técnico; Technical University of Lisbon; CONSULMAR
- Thesis: Impact of Vessels with Berthing Structures (1960)

Fernando Vasco Costa (1913 – 20 October 1996) was a Portuguese civil engineer and professor, specialising in port engineering. He held academic positions at the Instituto Superior Técnico and the Technical University of Lisbon, where he also served as rector. Vasco Costa made significant contributions to the theory and practice of ship berthing, mooring, and maritime structure design. He was a founding member of an engineering consultancy firm specialising in maritime infrastructure, and contributed to the development of ports in both Portugal and internationally.

In 1989, Vasco Costa became the first Portuguese Foreign Associate of the United States National Academy of Engineering, in recognition of his distinguished work in ocean and marine engineering. His academic research, consultancy, and publications, spanning over 50 papers and several books, remain influential in the field of port engineering.

== Early life and studies ==
Vasco Costa was born in Lisbon in 1913, the eldest son of Ines Vasco Serra Costa and Augusto Serra Costa, a maritime officer. He graduated as a civil engineer from the Instituto Superior Técnico in 1936, at the age of 22. After graduation, he began working as a design and site engineer for the German firm Gruen and Bilfinger A.G., overseeing foundation and harbour projects. Between 1941 and 1943, he served in the Engineer Corps of the Portuguese Army.

Throughout his career, Vasco Costa held various academic and professional positions. In 1946–1947, he was awarded a scholarship to study in the United States, where he spent a semester at Cornell University and another at the Bureau of Reclamation in Denver. In 1960, he received another scholarship, this time to Hydraulics Research Station in Wallingford where he developed a thesis on the impact of vessels on berthing structures.

== Career ==
Costa held a professorship at the Instituto Superior Técnico and, between 1963 and 1966, served as Vice-Rector of the Technical University of Lisbon, later becoming Rector from 1969 to 1972. Additionally, he held prominent roles within the Ministry of Public Works, as well as the Superior Council of Public Works and the Superior Council of Overseas Promotion.

In 1972, Vasco Costa became director-general of Consulmar, an engineering consultancy firm he had founded, where he worked until 1980, after which he transitioned into full-time consultancy work for harbour projects in Lisbon. As a consultant, he contributed to the development of several major Portuguese ports (such as Leixões, Setúbal, and Lisbon) and worked on several international projects in locations including Guinea-Bissau, Mozambique, India, and Macau.

In 1985, Vasco Costa was awarded the prestigious Manuel Rocha Research Prize by the Laboratório Nacional de Engenharia Civil for his contributions to engineering research. Four years later, in 1989, he was elected as a Foreign Associate of the National Academy of Engineering in the United States, the first and only Portuguese national to receive this honour. His election recognised his outstanding contributions to ocean and marine engineering, particularly in the mooring and berthing of ships.

Throughout his career, Vasco Costa authored over 50 papers and five books, primarily on port engineering, and he made significant advances in hydraulic modelling. His technical reference book, Tabelas Técnicas, was widely used by engineers in Portugal. He was also deeply involved in the analysis of structural risk, developing methods for evaluating the costs of structural failures.

His international reputation grew through invited lectures at institutions worldwide, including in Wallingford, Delft, and Buenos Aires, as well as through his leadership roles in various professional societies. He represented Portugal during the formation of the Engineering Commission on Oceanic Resources (ECOR) and was a prominent figure in the Permanent International Association of Navigation Congresses (PIANC), where he served as a Portuguese delegate from 1965 to 1981 and as chief delegate from 1977 to 1981.

== Recognition ==
In 1993, his contributions to engineering were recognised with the establishment of the Professor Vasco Costa Scholarship, which supports young researchers in presenting their work at international conferences. Vasco Costa was a fellow of the American Society of Civil Engineers and served as an assistant editor for international journals such as Coastal Engineering and the Journal of Coastal Research.

== Personal life ==
Vasco Costa met his future wife during his time stationed in the Azores with the Engineer Corps of the Portuguese Army. They married in 1944. He died on 20 October 1996.

== Selected Bibliography ==
Vasco Costa's academic research and writing included the following:

- Vasco Costa, F., Veloso Gomes, F., Silveira Ramos, F., & Vicente, C. M. (1996). History of Coastal Engineering in Portugal. In History and Heritage of Coastal Engineering, pp. 413.
- Vasco Costa, F. (1991). Expectation Ratio Versus Probability. In Reliability and Optimization of Structural Systems ’90, pp. 53.
- Vasco Costa, F. (1990). Time Scale Selection in Hydraulic Modelling. Journal of Coastal Research, 29(19900401), pp. 29.
- Vasco Costa, F. (1990). The Design of Unsafe Structures. Journal of Coastal Research, 294(19901001), pp. 294.
- Vasco Costa, F. (1989). Perception of Risks and Reactions to Accidents. In Reliability and Optimization of Structural Systems ’88, pp. 43.
- Vasco Costa, F. (1988). Fender Selection Criteria. Coastal Engineering Proceedings, 220(19880129), pp. 220.
- Vasco Costa, F. (1987). Reliability of Partly Damaged Structures. In Reliability and Optimization of Structural Systems, pp. 67.
- Vasco Costa, F., de Carvalho, J. R., & Matias, M. F. (1970). The Probabilistic Approach in the Design of Maritime Structures. Lisboa: Ministério das Obras Públicas, Laboratório de Engenharia Civil.
- Vasco Costa, F. (1964). The Berthing Ship: The Effect of Impact on the Design of Fenders and Berthing Structures. London: Foxlow Publications.
- Vasco Costa, F., Csendes, F. E., Levinton, Z., & Woodruff, G. B. (1963). Discussion of “Off-shore Mooring Island for Supertankers”. Journal of the Waterways and Harbors Division, 89(196305), pp. 99.
