= Alberto Romão Dias =

Portuguese scientist (1941–2007)

- Born: 1941
- Died: 15 July 2007

Alberto Romão Dias (1941 – 15 July 2007) was a full professor of the Chemical and Biological Engineering Department at the Instituto Superior Técnico (IST) of the Technical University of Lisbon in Portugal.

== Education ==
His alma mater includes graduating from industrial-chemical engineering at the Instituto Superior Técnico in 1964, a Ph.D. in chemistry from Oxford University in 1970, and Aggregation at the Instituto Superior Técnico in 1979.

== Research works ==
His research interests were in the area of inorganic chemistry, particularly chemistry of coordination compounds and the organometallic chemistry of transition metals. The latter work has been on mono and polynuclear complex containing the fragment M(η^{5}-C_{5}H_{5})_{2}.

Other topics in which he was interested include the synthesis of complexes with ligands containing phosphorus, reactions of metal vapours with different substrates aiming at the synthesis of new compounds, and the preparation of species with catalytic polymerization of olefins using transition metal complexes.

Recent research in this group includes the synthesis of new organometallic compounds (some of them with nonlinear optical properties), their characterisation (including the X-ray determination of the molecular structure), the study of their reactivity and of their redox behaviour, the determination of the metal-ligand bond energies from data obtained by calorimetry and the study of chemical bond using molecular orbital theory.

Dias published the book Ligação Química (English: Chemical Bond) in October 2006. This text is used mainly as a study guide for "Chemistry I" students at the Instituto Superior Técnico.

Alberto Romão Dias died on 15 July 2007.
