= Taguspark =

Coordinates: 38°44′15″N 9°18′14″W

Taguspark - Science and Technology Park
- Taguspark - Parque de Ciência e Tecnologia
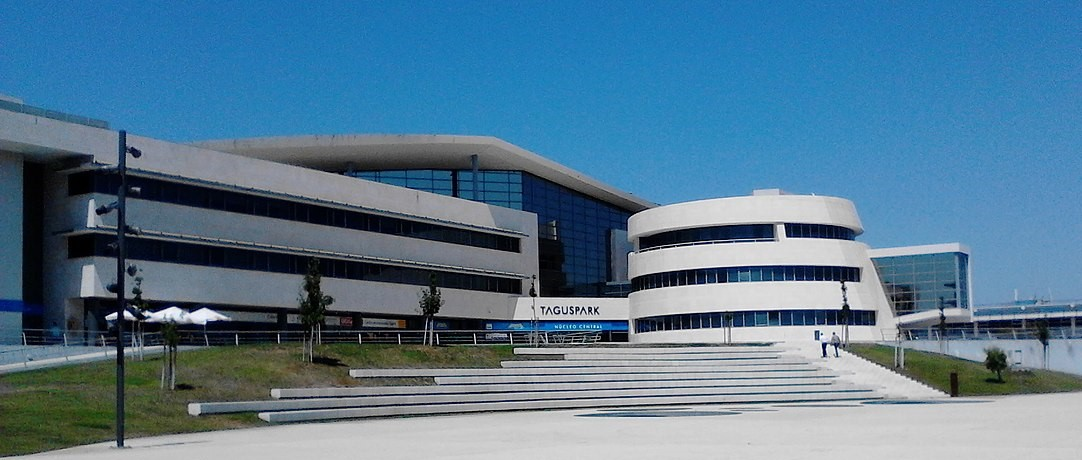
- Congress Center of Taguspark
- Interactive map of the Taguspark - Science and Technology Park area

General information
- Location: Porto Salvo, Oeiras
- Opened: 1992

Website
- www.taguspark.pt

Taguspark is a science and technology park located in the municipality of Oeiras, Greater Lisbon subregion, Portugal.

The Park covers an area of approximately 150 acres, and accommodates several research and development labs, innovative startups and business incubators in a range of fields such as information technologies (e.g. Portugal Telecom), telecommunications, electronics, materials, metrology, production, energy, environment, technical inspections and consultancy, biotechnologies and fine chemistry.

It also has partnerships with leading university institutions like the Universidade Técnica de Lisboa (recently merged with the Universidade de Lisboa, keeping the name Universidade de Lisboa) and its engineering faculty - the Instituto Superior Técnico (IST) which has facilities in the park. Its current president is Professor Carmona Rodrigues. Furthermore, the park is home to the leading international school: International Sharing School - Taguspark acquired in 2018 by the Sharing Foundation.

In the year 2013 the new Main Square was inaugurated, an integrally pedestrian Square with 10.000m2, more or less. Together with this requalification, a new building was created, which is the new headquarters of the Swiss multinational pharmaceutical company Novartis in Portugal.

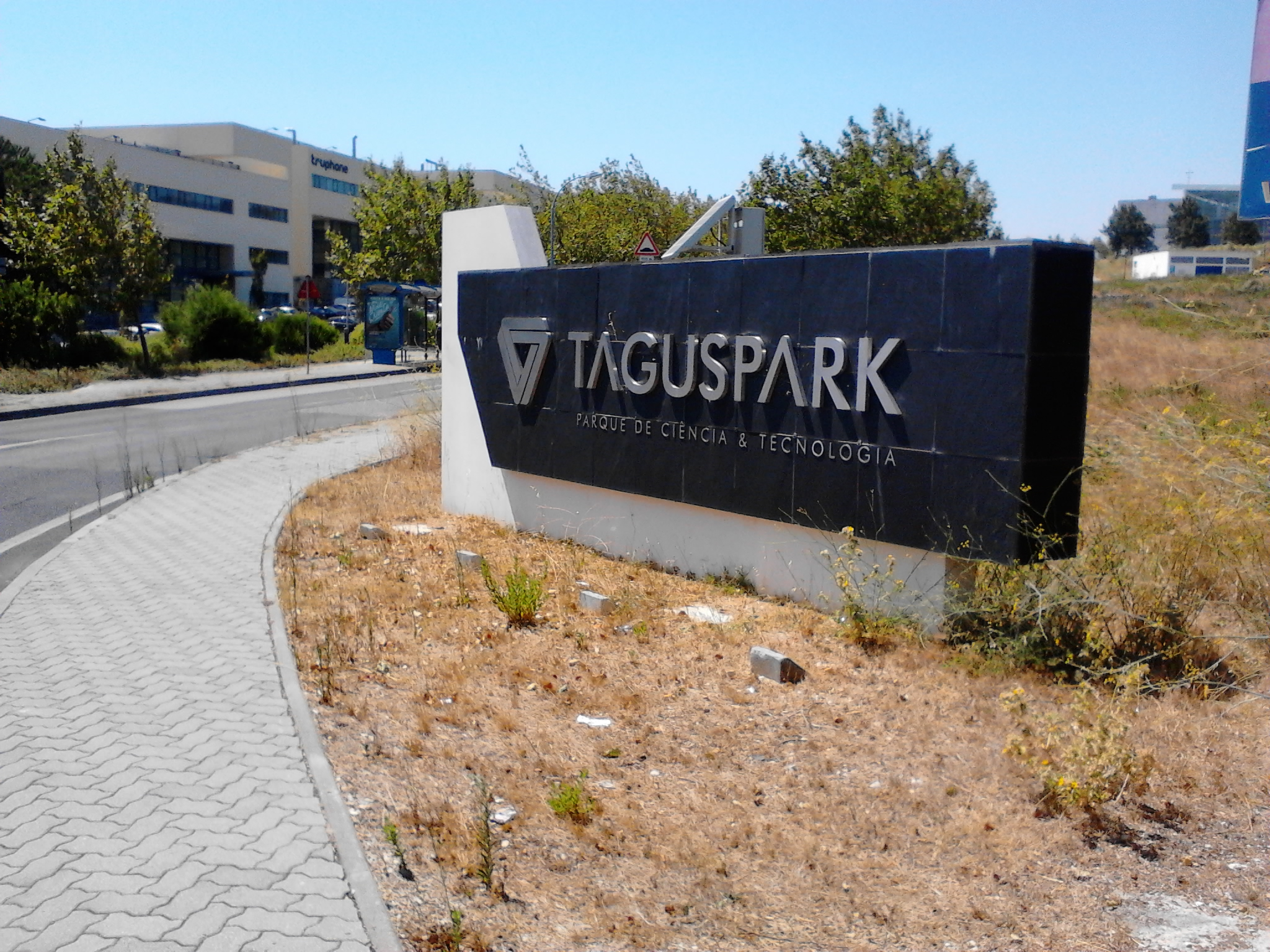
Entrance to Taguspark.

Almost simultaneously, was built the Students Residence, with a capacity of approximately 82 beds, implanted next to the Main Square and the IST facilities, allowing the students and young researchers from other parts of the country and from abroad to be lodged in the Taguspark, contributing with their presence for the vitality of the central area. The concept of the Main Square constitutes the initial stage of requalification and revitalization process of the central zone of the Taguspark. The goal is to create an integrally pedestrian Square, a space for meeting, interaction and accomplishment of urban entertainment events, combining culture, creativity and technological innovation. The space will allow the accomplishment of open-air concerts, street theatre, sculpture expositions, fashion parades, presentation of new products with stimulating thematic for the users of the Taguspark – Future, Knowledge, Innovation, Creativity, Sustainability, bringing life to the center of Taguspark.
