= João Arménio Correia Martins =

Portuguese engineer (1951–2008)

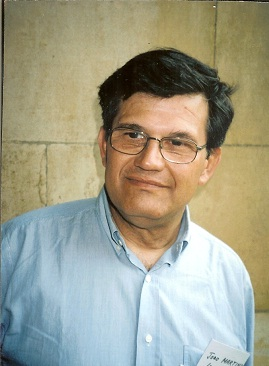
- Born: November 11, 1951; Olhão, Portugal
- Died: August 5, 2008 (aged 56); Lisbon, Portugal
- Known for: The development of the compliance friction law in collaboration with Prof. J.T. Oden
- Scientific career
- Fields: Computational mechanics
- Workplaces: Instituto Superior Técnico (Technical University of Lisbon), University of Texas at Austin
- Doctoral advisor: John Tinsley Oden

João Arménio Correia Martins (November 11, 1951 – August 5, 2008) was a Portuguese engineer.

== Biography ==
Martins was born on November 11, 1951, at the southern town of Olhão in Portugal. He attended high school at the Liceu Nacional de Faro which he completed in 1969. Afterwards João Martins moved to Lisbon where he was graduate student of Civil Engineering at Instituto Superior Técnico (IST) until 1976. He was a research assistant and assistant instructor at IST until 1981. Subsequently, he entered the graduate school in the College of Engineering, Department of Aerospace Engineering and Engineering Mechanics of The University of Texas at Austin, United States. There he obtained a MSc in 1983 with a thesis titled A Numerical Analysis of a Class of Problems in Elastodynamics with Friction Effects and a PhD in 1986 with a thesis titled Dynamic Frictional Contact Problems Involving Metallic Bodies, both supervised by Prof. John Tinsley Oden. He returned to Portugal in 1986 and became assistant professor at IST. In 1989 he became associate professor and in 1996 he earned the academic degree of "agregado" from the Technical University of Lisbon. Later, in 2005, he became full professor in the Department of Civil Engineering and Architecture of IST.

His areas of research include contact solid mechanics, nonlinear dynamics and instability phenomena, mathematical methods and numerical techniques for the solution of solid mechanics problems, nonlinear constitutive laws in solid mechanics and biomechanics.

His PhD thesis was on models and computational methods for the study of dynamic behaviour of metallic bodies subjected to dry frictional contacts. It contains (i) a detailed study of phenomenological interface constitutive laws (ii) a constitutive interface law incorporating the normal deformability of the interface and the Coulomb friction law, (iii) formulations of the dynamic and steady sliding contact problems together with proofs on existence and uniqueness of solutions, (iv) numerical techniques and algorithms for the study of the dynamic and steady sliding problems, (v) numerical finite element results and parametric studies on the stability of steady sliding and on friction induced oscillations.

Prof. João Martins was member of the general assembly of IUTAM and served as vice-president of the Portuguese Association for Theoretical, Applied and Computational Mechanics (APMTAC) in 2006 and 2007. He also served as president of the ICIST research institute in 2003, 2004, 2007 and 2008.

João Martins died unexpectedly in his home in Lisbon on 5 August 2008.

In 2008 the Instituto Superior Técnico created the Professor João Arménio Correia Martins Award to recognize undergraduate students with a solid background in the fields of structural mechanics and computational mechanics. In 2009 the Associação Portuguesa de Mecânica Teórica, Aplicada e Computacional created the Young Researcher Award Professor João Martins. In 2009 the Sociedade Portuguesa de Biomecânica created the Professor João Martins Award to recognize the work of young researchers in the field of biomechanics.

== List of publications ==
Theses:

- “A numerical analysis of a class of problems in elastodynamics with friction effects”, M.Sc. Thesis, The University of Texas at Austin, 1983.
- “Dynamic frictional contact problems involving metallic bodies”, Ph.D. Dissertation, The University of Texas at Austin, 1986.

Peer reviewed international journals:

- “Transient analysis of plates by mixed elements” (with C.A. Mota Soares, J.M.M. Godinho), Wissenschaftliche Zeitschrift der Hochshule für Architektur und Bauwesen Weimar, 28, pp. 169–172, 1982.
- “A numerical analysis of a class of problems in elastodynamics with friction effects” (with J.T. Oden), Comp. Meth. Appl. Mech. Eng., 40, pp. 327–360, 1984.
- “Models and computational methods for dynamic friction phenomena” (with J.T. Oden), Comp. Meth. Appl. Mech. Eng., 52, pp. 527 – 634, 1985.
- “Existence and local uniqueness of solutions to contact problems in elasticity with nonlinear friction laws” (with P. Rabier, J.T. Oden, L.T. Campos), Int. J. Engng. Sci., 24, pp. 1755–1768, 1986.
- “Existence and uniqueness results for dynamic contact problems with nonlinear normal and friction interface laws” (with J.T. Oden), Nonlinear Analysis, Theory, Methods and Applications, 11, pp. 407 – 428, 1987, with corrigendum in vol. 12, p. 747, 1988.
- “A study of static and kinetic friction” (with J.T. Oden, F.M.F. Simões), Int. J. Engng. Sci., 28, pp. 29 – 92, 1990.
- “On an example of non-existence of solution to a quasi-static frictional contact problem” (with M.D.P. Monteiro Marques, F. Gastaldi), European Journal of Mechanics, A/Solids, 13, pp. 113–133, 1994.
- “Dynamic surface solutions in linear elasticity and viscoelasticity with frictional boundary conditions” (with L.O. Faria, J. Guimarães), ASME J. Vibration and Acoustics, 117, pp. 445–451, 1995.
- “A two degree-of-freedom quasistatic contact problem with viscous damping” (with F. Gastaldi, M.D.P. Monteiro Marques), Advances in Mathematical Sciences and Applications, 5, pp. 421–455, 1995.
- “Surface boundary conditions trigger flutter instability in non-associative elastic-plastic solids” (with B. Loret, F.M.F. Simões), Int. J. Solids Structures, 32, pp. 2155–2190, 1995.
- “Dissipative graph solutions for a 2 degree-of-freedom quasistatic frictional contact problem” (with F.M.F. Simões, F. Gastaldi, M.D.P. Monteiro Marques), Int. J. Engng. Sci., 33, pp. 1959–1986, 1995.
- “Oscillations of bridge stay-cables induced by periodic motions of the deck and/or the towers” (with A. Pinto da Costa, F. Branco, J.L. Lilien), ASCE Journal of Engineering Mechanics, 122, pp. 613–622, 1996.
- “A finite element analysis of non-prescribed crack propagation in concrete” (with J. Alfaiate, E.B. Pires), Computers & Structures, 63, pp. 17–26, 1997.
- “Growth and decay of acceleration waves in non-associative elastic-plastic fluid-saturated porous media” (with B. Loret, F.M.F. Simões), Int. J. Solids Structures, 34, pp. 1583–1608, 1997.
- “Instability and ill-posedness in some friction problems” (with F.M.F. Simões), Int. J. Engng. Sci., 36, pp. 1265–1293, 1998.
- “Mathematical analysis of a two degree-of-freedom frictional contact problem with discontinuous solutions” (with F. Gastaldi, M.D.P.Monteiro Marques), Mathl. Comput. Modelling, 28, pp. 247–261, 1998.
- “A numerical model for the passive and active behavior of skeletal muscles” (with E.B. Pires, L.R. Salvado, P.B. Dinis), Comp. Methods Appl. Mechs. Engrg., 151, pp. 419–433, 1998.
- “Surface instabilities in a Mooney-Rivlin body with frictional boundary conditions” (with T. Desoyer), International Journal of Adhesion and Adhesives, 18, pp. 413–419, 1998.
- “Instabilities in elastic-plastic fluid-saturated porous media: harmonic wave versus acceleration wave analyses” (with F.M.F. Simões, B. Loret), Int. J. Solids Structures, 36, pp. 1277–1295, 1999.
- “Dynamic stability of finite dimensional linearly elastic systems with unilateral contact and Coulomb friction” (with S. Barbarin, M. Raous, A. Pinto da Costa), Comp. Methods Appl. Mechs. Engrg., 177, pp. 289–328, 1999.
- “Preface” (with Anders Klarbring), Comp. Methods Appl. Mechs. Engrg., special issue on Computational Modeling of Contact and Friction, 177, pp. 163–165, 1999.
- “Friction and instability of steady sliding: squeal of a rubber / glass contact” (with D. Vola, M. Raous), Int. J. Num. Meth. Engng., pp. 1699–1720, 1999.
- “Stability of finite-dimensional nonlinear elastic systems with unilateral contact and friction” (with A. Pinto da Costa), Int. J. Solids Structures, 37, pp. 2519–2564, 2000.
- “The evolution and rate problems and the computation of all possible evolutions in quasi-static frictional contact” (with A. Pinto da Costa), Comput. Methods Appl. Mech. Engrg., 192, pp. 2791–2821, 2003.
- “A numerical study on multiple rate solutions and onset of directional instability in quasi-static frictional contact problems” (with A. Pinto da Costa), Computers & Structures, 82, pp. 1485–1494, 2004
- “The directional instability problem in systems with frictional contacts” (with A. Pinto da Costa, I.N. Figueiredo, J.J. Júdice), Comput. Methods Appl. Mech. Engrg., 193, pp. 357–384, 2004.
- “Dynamics with friction and persistent contact” (with M.D.P. Monteiro Marques, A. Petrov), Z. Angew. Math. Mech., 85, pp. 531–538, 2005.
- “Flutter Instability in a Non-associative Elastic-plastic Layer: analytical versus finite element results” (with F.M.F. Simões), Int. J. Engng. Sci., 43, pp. 189–208, 2005.
- “A shell finite element model of the pelvic floor muscles” (with D. d'Aulignac, E.B. Pires, T. Mascarenhas, R.M. Natal Jorge), Computer Methods in Biomechanics and Biomedical Engineering, 8, pp. 339 – 347, 2005.
- “On the (in)stability of quasi-static paths of smooth systems: definitions and sufficient conditions” (with N.V. Rebrova, V.A. Sobolev), Mathematical Methods in the Applied Sciences, 29, pp. 741–750, 2006.
- “Arc-length method for frictional contact problems using mathematical programming with complementarity constraints” (with Y. Kanno), Journal of Optimization Theory and Applications, 131, pp. 89–113, 2006.
- “Three-dimensional quasi-static frictional contact by using a second-order cone linear complementarity problem” (with Y. Kanno, A. Pinto da Costa), International Journal for Numerical Methods in Engineering, 65, pp. 62–83, 2006.
- “A finite element model of skeletal muscles” (with M.P.M Pato, E.B. Pires), Virtual and Physical Prototyping, 1(3), pp. 159–170, 2006.
- “Finite element studies of the deformation of the pelvic floor” (with M.P.M Pato, E.B. Pires, R.M.N. Jorge, M. Parente, T. Mascarenhas), Annals of the New York Academy of Sciences, 1101, pp. 316–334, 2007.
- “On the stability of quasi-static paths for finite dimensional elastic-plastic systems with hardening” (with M.D.P. Monteiro Marques, A. Petrov), Z. Angew. Math. Mech., 84, pp. 303–313, 2007.
- “Convergence of solutions to kinetic variational inequality in the rate-independent quasi-static limit” (with A. Mielke, A. Petrov), J. Math. Anal. Appl., 348, pp. 1012–1020, 2008.
- “On the stability of elastic-plastic systems with hardening” (with M.D.P. Monteiro Marques, A. Petrov), J. Math. Anal. Appl., 343, pp. 1007–1021, 2008.
- “Deformation of the pelvic floor muscles during a vaginal delivery” (with M.P.L. Parente, R.M.N. Jorge, T. Mascarenhas, A.A. Fernandes), International Urogynecology Journal, 19, pp. 65–71, 2008.
- “The influence of an occipito-posterior malposition on the biomechanical behavior of the pelvic floor” (with M.P.L. Parente, R.M.N. Jorge, T. Mascarenhas, A.A. Fernandes), European Journal of Obstetrics & Gynecology and Reproductive Biology, 144, pp. S166-S169, 2009.
- “The influence of material properties on the biomechanical behavior of the pelvic floor muscles during vaginal delivery” (with M.P.L. Parente, R.M.N. Jorge, T. Mascarenhas, A.A. Fernandes), Journal of Biomechanics, 42, pp. 1301–1306, 2009.
- “Finite strain plasticity, the stress condition and a complete shell model” (with P. Areias and M.C. Ritto-Correa), Computational Mechanics, 45, pp. 189–209, 2010.
- “Assessing the ′(in)stability of quasi-static paths′” (with F.M.F. Simões and A. Pinto da Costa), International Journal of Engineering Science, 55, pp. 18–34, 2012.
