= Stephan Morais =

Portuguese British investor (born 1973)

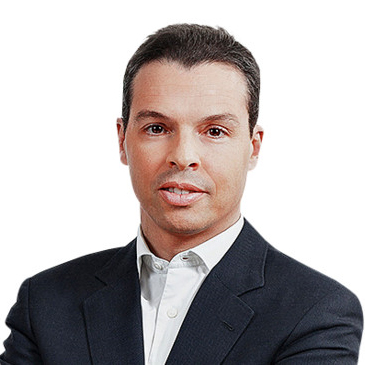
- Born: October 27, 1973 (age 52); London, England
- Occupations: investor and businessperson

Stephan Morais (Stephan Godinho Lopes de Moraes, born October 27, 1973, in London, England) is a Portuguese British investor.

Morais is an engineer by training, having graduated from Instituto Superior Técnico in 1996 with a civil engineering degree. Departing from his field of study, he completed an MBA on private equity and venture capital at Harvard Business School and went on to work in management, consulting, banking and investment.

In 2019, he co-founded Indico Capital Partners, a venture capital firm, of which he is the managing general partner.

== Early life and education ==
Morais, the son of Portuguese lawyers, was born in London, England, and grew up in Lisbon, Portugal, where he attended Colégio Sagrado Coração de Maria and Colégio Valsassina.

A civil engineer, Morais graduated in 1996 from the Instituto Superior Técnico - University of Lisbon in Lisbon, having spent the last semester at the École Nationale des Ponts et Chaussées in Paris, France. In 2000 he was accepted for the MBA program of Harvard Business School. He graduated in 2002, specialising in private equity and venture capital and being awarded a Sainsbury Management Fellowship.

== Career ==
Morais initiated his career at the Halcrow Group Limited in the UK, working in privatization projects on behalf of multilateral agencies in Mozambique, Pakistan, Panama and Chile. He later moved permanently to London, joining Arthur Andersen Business Consulting. He co-founded a London-based startup during the dotcom boom focusing on water trading, the Waterexchange.

Upon completing his MBA, Morais was appointed as consultant to the Portuguese Government for the privatization of a main State investing conglomerate, IPE, and for the draft of the country's National Energy policy. Morais joined Energias de Portugal in 2003 as chief of staff of the CEO and was subsequently appointed managing director of the Bilbao-based Naturgas Energia Servicios.

Having specialized in private equity investments while attending Harvard, Morais was invited to invest in, and lead as CEO, Temahome, a major Portuguese furniture design and manufacturing company, with a group of other Portuguese investors and the company's management team, in 2006. He left the company at the end of 2009. A year later, Morais was the first Portuguese person to be named a Young Global Leader by the World Economic Forum.

In 2010, Morais joined Portugal's largest bank, Grupo Caixa Geral de Depósitos, where he was appointed as board member and deputy CEO of a new African investment bank based in Mozambique, BNI - Banco Nacional de Investimento, a partnership between Portuguese Caixa and the Mozambican government. He also worked as executive director of Caixa Capital.

While at Caixa, Morais led investments in most major Portuguese and global startups, such as Farfetch, Unbabel, Uniplaces, D-Orbit, amongst others, that raised significant capital in Silicon Valley and London.

Morais has worked as a non-executive director at Crimson Investment Management, and is a former Venture Capital Council Member at Invest Europe, Council Member of the International Venture Club, Chairman of the European Venture Finance Network and a jury at numerous entrepreneurship and investment awards.

In 2017, Morais left Caixa to co-found his own independent investment fund, Indico Capital Partners, alongside Caixa colleague Ricardo Torgal, and Talkdesk co-founder Cristina Fonseca. Indico is an Iberia focused, industry agnostic, multi stage fund, albeit with a focus on early stage to Series A.

In 2020, Indico was chosen by Google for Startups as the partner fund for their accelerator program, which was launched in the same year and is now on its 3rd edition. In 2022, a climate-action strategy was launched with the Indico Blue Fund, that backs sustainable blue economy startups and SMEs based in Portugal.

Since 2019, Indico has invested 35 million euros in 30 companies, including Tier, Anchorage Digital, Eleos insurance and Remote, which have raised more than 1.5 billion euros from global investors, making it the leading independent venture capital fund in Portugal. Morais is currently the managing general partner at Indico Capital Partners.

== Awards ==
- 2002 Sainsbury Management Fellowship
- 2009 DME Award - Design management Europe
- 2009 National Design Award - "Sena da Silva" Presented by the Portuguese Design Center and the President of the Portuguese Republic
- 2010 Nominated Young Global Leader by the World Economic Forum
