= Luis Veiga da Cunha =

Portuguese environmental scientist

Luís Veiga da Cunha
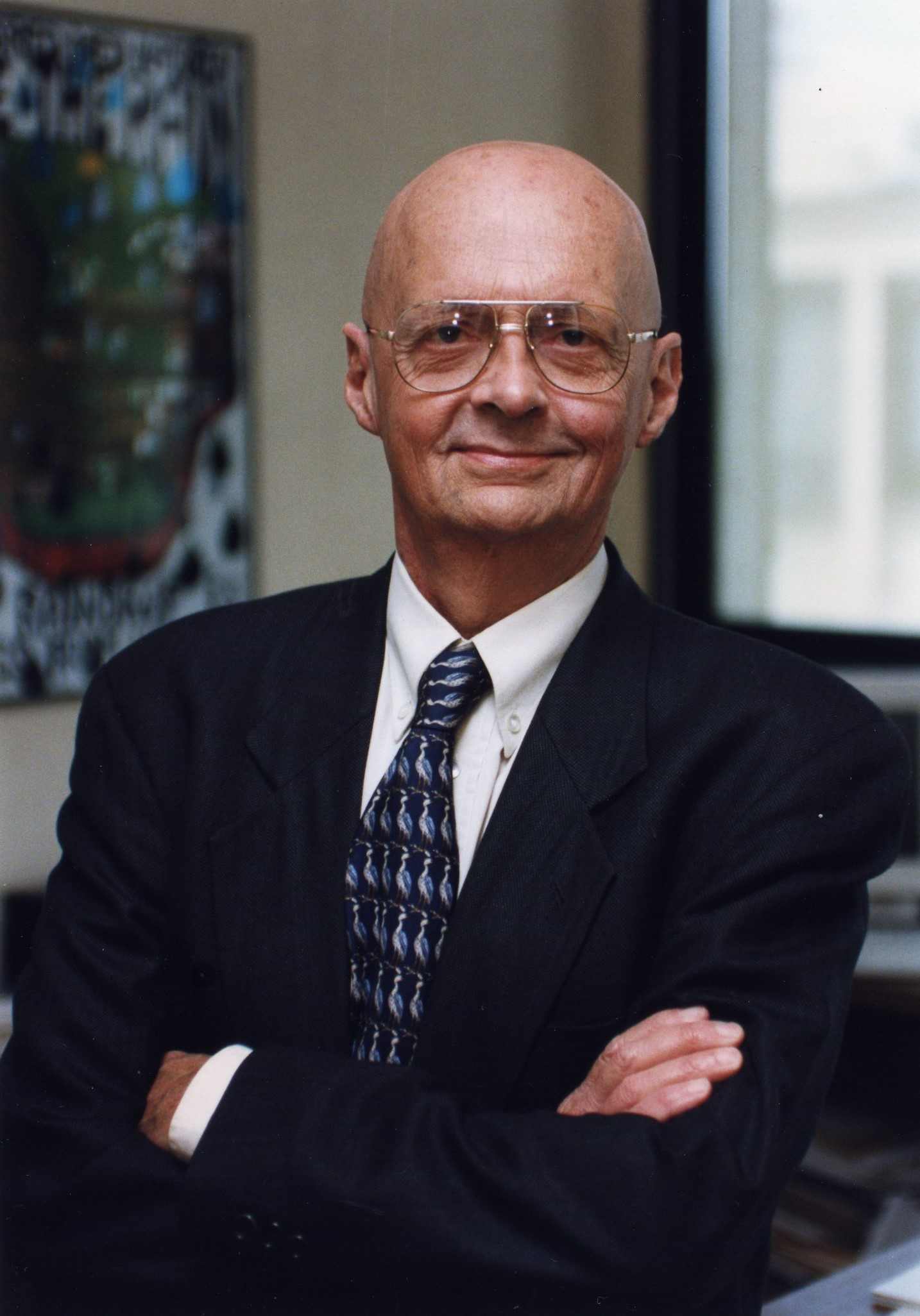
- Luís Veiga da Cunha
- Born: 1936 (age 89–90); Lisbon, Portugal
- Education: Technical University of Lisbon
- Known for: Water resources policy; Environmental security; IPCC Third Assessment Report
- Awards: Military Order of Saint James of the Sword (Grand-Officer); Ordre national du Mérite (Grand-Officer)
- Scientific career
- Fields: Environmental sciences; Water resources management
- Workplaces: NOVA University Lisbon; Colorado State University; NATO

Luis Veiga da Cunha (born 1936 in Lisbon), is a Portuguese scientist, Professor at the Department of Environmental Sciences and Engineering of the NOVA University Lisbon.

== Early life and education ==
Da Cunha graduated in Civil Engineering at the Technical University of Lisbon and he holds a PhD degree from the same university. His main professional interests are related to Environment and Natural Resources Policies and Management, with a special emphasis on Water Resources.

== Career in Portugal (until 1983) ==
He worked in Portugal until 1983 in teaching, research and consulting activities. During this period he was involved in numerous research projects and undertook consulting and teaching work in Portugal and in several foreign countries. Between 1971 and 1983 he was Director of the Division of Hydrology and River Hydraulics of the National Laboratory of Civil Engineering, LNEC in Lisbon, where he initiated the development of several new lines of research in the areas of water resources management and planning and of sustainable use of water resources.

== Visiting professorship ==
Da Cunha was Visiting Professor at Colorado State University (Fort Collins, Colorado) for the full academic year 1975-1976.

== NATO career (1983–1999) ==
Between 1983 and 1999 Da Cunha lived in Brussels where he served as Administrator of the Scientific and Environmental Affairs Division of the North Atlantic Treaty Organization. This Division was the executive arm for the programmes initiated by two Committees of the NATO Council: the Science Committee and the Committee on the Challenges of the Modern Society. The programmes of these two committees were originally intended to foster scientific, technological and environmental cooperation between the North American and the European NATO countries. Later, after the disintegration of the Soviet Union, they mainly focused on cooperation between NATO countries and the so-called partner countries in Central and Eastern Europe and the former Soviet Union. Among his responsibilities while serving at NATO, he launched and directed various programs in the area of the environment, in particular the Special Programs on “Environmental Security” and “The Science of Global Environmental Change”. Each of these areas developed into a large number of projects and about 60 books have been published based on the results.

== Return to Portugal (1999–present) ==
In 1999 Da Cunha returned to Portugal, as a full Professor at the NOVA University Lisbon. He also became a member of the National Council on Environment and Sustainable Development since 2001 and of the National Water Council since its creation in 1994. From 2001 to 2005 he has served as the Portuguese national delegate to the NATO Science Committee.

== Climate and environmental work ==
Da Cunha was a member of the International Panel on Climate Change (IPCC) of the United Nations (1999-2001) and a Lead Author of the chapter on Water Resources of the Third Assessment Report of the IPCC, published in 2001. He was also author and coordinator of the chapter on Water Resources of the Portuguese National Projects SIAM I and SIAM II (Climate Change in Portugal: Scenarios, Impacts and Adaptation Measures, 2001-2006).

== Professional associations and leadership ==
He was founder and the first President of the Portuguese Water Resources Association (1977–78) and Director of the International Water Resources Association. He was Director of the International Water Resources Association and Chairman of the Committee on River Hydraulics of the International Association on Hydraulic Research. He has been a member of the Editorial Board of Water Policy, the official science and technology journal of the World Water Council. He has also been a member of the Editorial Board of Water International, the journal of the International Water Resources Association. From 2010 to 2013 he was a member and coordinator of the "Gulbenkian Think Thank on Water and the Future of Humanity", an international group of reflection established by the Calouste Gulbenkian Foundation that gathered eleven distinguished scientists and experts in global water issues. The book "Water and the Future of Humanity" (Springer) was published in 2014, as a result of this work. Veiga da Cunha is a member of the Portuguese Academy of Engineering and a member and of the French Water Academy.

== Publications ==
Da Cunha is the author of several books and publications on environmental and water resources issues.

== Awards and honors ==
Da Cunha was awarded the Portuguese Order of Military Order of Saint James of the Sword (Grand-Officer) for scientific and cultural merit, and the French Ordre national du Mérite (Grand-Officer). He was Minister of Education of Portugal in 1979-1980.

== Political career ==
Da Cunha was elected a corresponding member of the Engineering Sciences section of the Lisbon Academy of Sciences in 2008.

== See also ==
- Water resources management
- Environmental policy
- International Water Resources Association
- Intergovernmental Panel on Climate Change
