= Arlindo Oliveira =

Portuguese academic and researcher (born 1963)

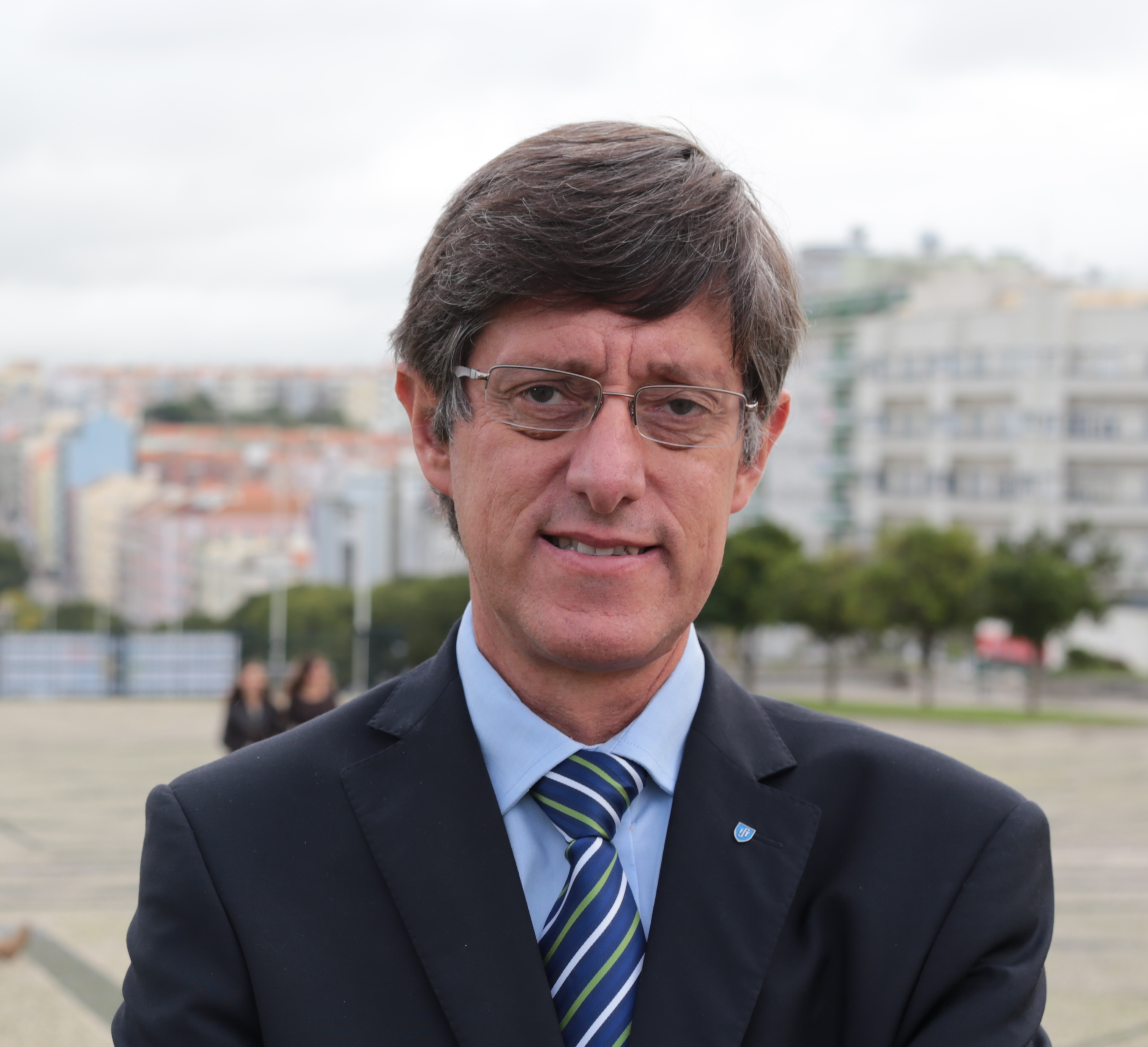
- Oliveira in 2013
- Born: 4 June 1963 (age 63); Negage, Portuguese Angola
- Education: University of California, Berkeley (Phd, 1994), Instituto Superior Técnico - University of Lisbon, (BSc, 1986; MSc, 1989)
- Scientific career
- Fields: Bioinformatics, Machine Learning, Computer Architecture
- Thesis: Inductive Learning by Selection of Minimal Complexity Representations
- Website: https://arlindo.oliveira.cc

Arlindo Manuel Limede de Oliveira (born 4 June 1963) is a Portuguese academic, researcher and writer. He is author of more than 150 scientific articles and papers in conferences, and three books: Computer Architecture (co-authored with Guilherme Arroz and José Monteiro, published by World Scientific and IST Press), The Digital Mind (published by MIT Press and IST Press), and Inteligência Artificial (published by Fundação Francisco Manuel dos Santos).

Oliveira obtained his engineering degree from Instituto Superior Técnico (University of Lisbon) and his PhD degree from the University of California, Berkeley. He is a senior member of the IEEE and the Portuguese Academy of Engineering, a notable alumnus of the University of Lisbon and, between 2015 and 2018, the Head of the Portuguese node of ELIXIR.

He was director of INESC-ID between 2000 and 2009, and president of the Instituto Superior Técnico between January 2012 and December 2019. He is currently the president of INESC.

== Bibliography ==
Author

- 2019 - Inteligência Artificial, Fundação Francisco Manuel dos Santos, ISBN 978-989-8943-30-9 (in Portuguese)
- 2017 - The Digital Mind: How Science is Redefining Humanity, MIT Press, ISBN 978-0262535236

Co-author

- 2018 - Computer Architecture: Digital Circuits to Microprocessors (co-authored with Guilherme Arroz and José Monteiro), World Scientific, ISBN 978-981-122-133-0 (originally published in Portuguese with the title Arquitectura de Computadores: Dos Sistemas Digitais aos Microprocessadores, by IST Press, in 2007)
