= Isabel Vaz =

Portuguese business executive

- Born: Porto, Portugal
- Education: NOVA University Lisbon, Instituto Superior Técnico, Lisbon
- Known for: CEO of Luz Saúde healthcare company

Isabel Vaz is the executive chair of Luz Saúde, one of the largest healthcare companies in Portugal.

== Early life and education ==
Vaz was born (1965 or 1966) in Portugal's second city of Porto. Her father was a cardiologist. When she was four, her family moved to Setúbal to the south of Lisbon. She studied chemical engineering at the Instituto Superior Técnico (IST) of the University of Lisbon, obtaining a degree in 1990. During her studies she met her husband, João Filipe Vaz. They have two children.

== Career ==
Vaz started her career as a laboratory researcher, but soon realised that this did not suit her. In 1992, she joined the international consulting firm, McKinsey & Company, and in 1994 she obtained an MBA from NOVA University Lisbon. Among her assignments with McKinsey was the privatization of Banco Espírito Santo and of the Tranquilidade insurance division of the Espírito Santo group. Through this work she met Ricardo Salgado, then president of the bank, who in 1999 asked her to lead a new venture in healthcare, initially known as Grupo Espírito Santo Saúde and now as Luz Saúde. Under her management the company, now owned by Fosun Pharma, has expanded to run 14 hospitals, 13 clinics, and one retirement home, including a Public-Private Partnership arrangement with the state Hospital Beatriz Ângelo in Loures. It employs around 13,800 people. The company takes its name from the Hospital da Luz, opened in 2007, which, in turn, takes its name from the area of Lisbon in which it is situated.

Vaz is a member of the International Advisory Board of the Lisbon MBA at NOVA University. She was also a member of the General Council of the University of Lisbon. She is a non-executive director of Sonae and CTT Correios de Portugal and a regular speaker at universities on topics such as health management, leadership, human resources, and the financial sustainability of health systems.

== Awards and recognition ==
In 2015, she received the Jornal de Negócios “Excellens Oeconomia” award as the best manager of the year in Portugal. In 2017, she received the Maria de Lourdes Pintasilgo Award 2017, given by IST to former students who have distinguished themselves in their professional and social careers. In 2023, Forbes Portugal listed her as 15th in a list of the 50 most powerful businesswomen in Portugal and in the same year the Executiva web site rated her as 13th in a list of the 25 most powerful women in Portugal.
