= Maria Amélia Chaves =

Portuguese civil engineer (1911–2017)

- Born: Maria Amélia de Sousa Ferreira Chaves; 28 January 1911; São Jorge de Arroios, Lisbon
- Died: 5 April 2017 (aged 106); Lisbon
- Other name: Maria Amélia de Sousa Ferreira Chaves de Almeida Fernandes
- Education: Instituto Superior Técnico, Universidade Técnica de Lisboa
- Occupation: Civil engineer
- Known for: First Portuguese woman to graduate and then work in civil engineering, first Portuguese female engineer to work in the field.

Maria Amélia de Sousa Ferreira Chaves de Almeida Fernandes (28 January 1911 – 5 April 2017) was a Portuguese civil engineer. She was the first female civil engineer to graduate from the Instituto Superior Técnico of the Universidade Técnica de Lisboa. She is considered to be the first Portuguese woman to graduate and then work in civil engineering, and the first Portuguese female engineer to work in the field.

== Early life ==
Maria Amélia de Sousa Ferreira Chaves was born in São Jorge de Arroios, Lisbon on 28 January 1911, the daughter of General João Carlos Pires Ferreira Chaves, a military commander and engineer. She had a brother Fernando de Sousa Ferreira Chaves. She was the niece of the engineer Raul Pires Ferreira Chaves, Maria Alexandrina Pires Ferreira Chaves and early Portuguese military pilot Olímpio Ferreira Chaves. She spent two years in India between 1927 and 1927 when her father was Chief of Staff of the Portuguese Army there. On her return she taught in a school to save money for her college education.

== Education ==
At the age of 20, Maria Amélia Chaves entered the Instituto Superior Técnico of the Universidade Técnica de Lisboa in 1931. She studied on the general technical course, the first two years were on general technical subjects, with students choosing a specialism in the third year. She was expected to choose chemistry, as it was considered more suitable for a woman, but opted for the civil engineering course, which challenged social norms of the time. Chaves graduated with a degree in civil engineering in 1937.

== Career ==
After a traineeship with the company run by engineer and later politician Eduardo Arantes e Oliveira, Chaves joined the staff of Lisbon City Council. It was unusual for a woman to work in civil engineering at the time, even more so to work outside the office and go into the field to supervise works on site. Chaves designed and had made a special trouser-skirt, so she could climb scaffolding without issue. She developed good working relationships with and become respected by the workers on site. However, she felt constantly restricted by her superiors, and resigned from the council in the 1940s.

Chaves set up as an independent contractor and never stopped working in the construction industry. She was an innovator and undertook the first anti-seismic building tests carried out in Portugal, which she presented in two papers at the First Symposium on Earthquakes, held in Lisbon in 1955: "Economic aspect of the consideration of the action of earthquakes in the design of buildings" and "The collaboration of engineer and architect in the design of anti-seismic constructions". She was the engineer on the Escola Industrial e Comercial de Oliveira de Azeméis (Industrial and Commercial School) from 1959 to 1963. When she was nearly ninety years old she carried out her last anti-seismic tests, for the building where she lived.

In 1938, she was the first woman to join the Order of Engineers, and was its dean in 2012. She was the first woman to sign projects and follow their execution to the end.

== Honours ==
She was honoured by her alma mater Instituto Superior Técnico in 2011, during a ceremony that brought together the first women in Técnico's history.

== Personal life ==
She married aged 28, to General Afonso Pinto de Magalhães Galvão Mexia de Almeida Fernandes, who was also an engineer.
