= Porto Salvo =

- Civil parish
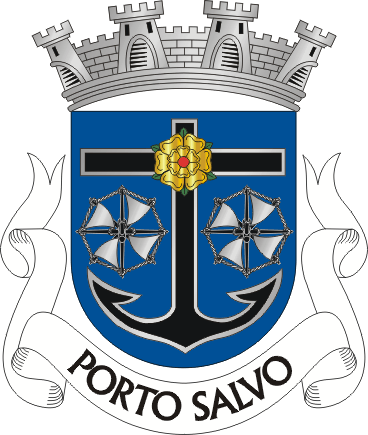
- Coat of arms

- Location in Portugal
- Coordinates: 38.723°N 9.306°W
- Country: Portugal
- Region: Lisbon
- Metropolitan area: Lisbon
- District: Lisbon
- Municipality: Oeiras

Area
  - Total: 7.34 km^{2} (2.83 sq mi)

Population (2011)
  - Total: 15,157
  - Density: 2,100/km^{2} (5,300/sq mi)
- Time zone: UTC+00:00 (WET)
  - Summer (DST): UTC+01:00 (WEST)
- Postal code: 2740
- Area code: 214
- Patron: Nossa Senhora do Porto Salvo

Porto Salvo (Portuguese pronunciation: [ˈpoɾtu ˈsalvu]) is a civil parish in the municipality of Oeiras, Portugal. It is situated to the north of the parish of Oeiras e São Julião da Barra, Paço de Arcos e Caxias. The population in 2011 was 15,157, in an area of 7.34 km^{2}.

== History ==
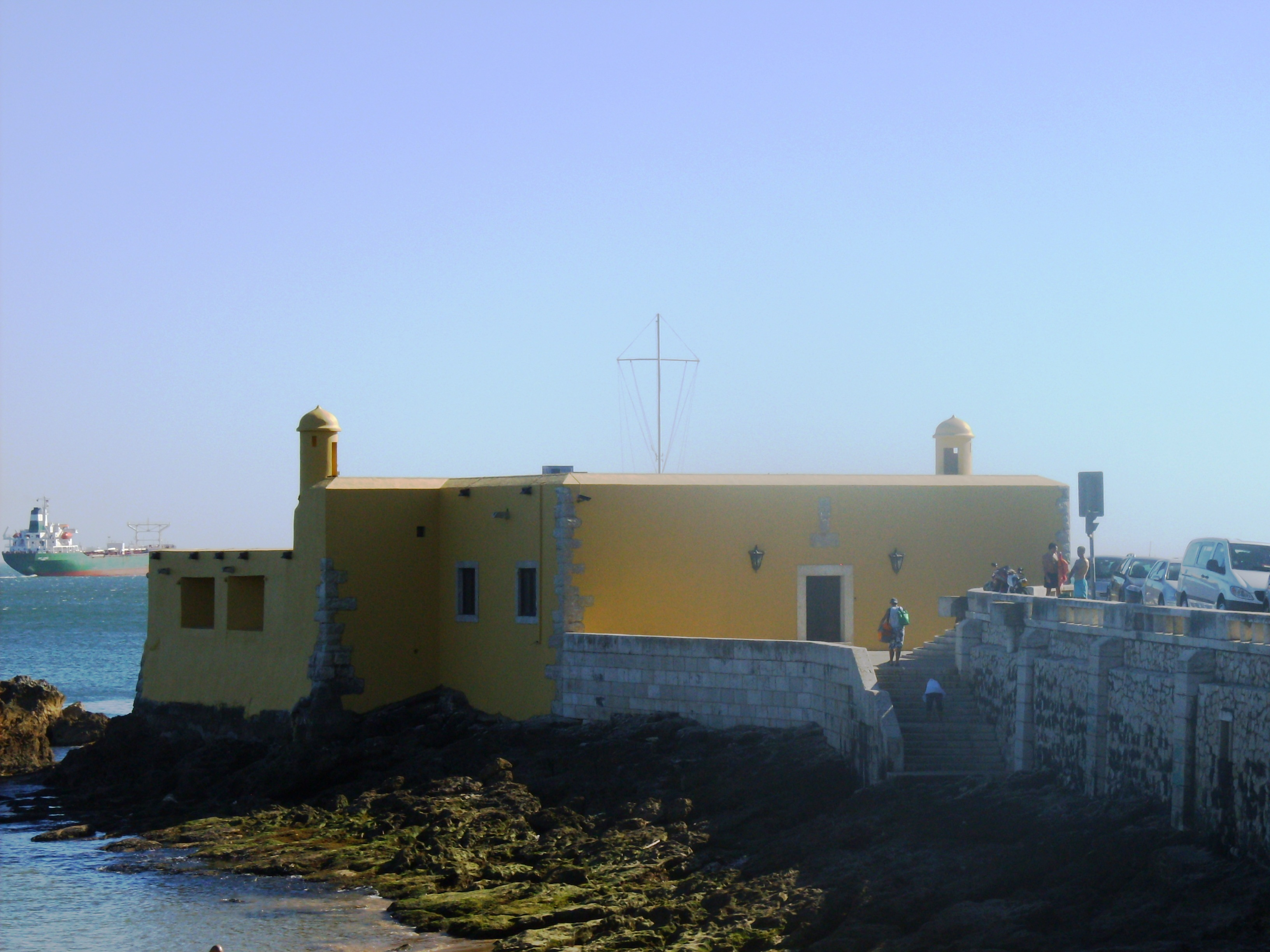
The renovated Fort of Nossa Senhora de Porto Salvo

Tradition suggests that the locality of Porto Salvo was constructed by crews from ships travelling to and from India, during the Portuguese period of discovery. In the middle of a great storm, these sailors promised the Virgin Mary that if they saved their lives, that they would build in her honour a hermitage on the highest point on land. Since this time, all the ships that arrived along the Tagus fired a 20-gun salvo in honour of their invocation until the end of the 19th century. The hilltop, where the actual parish is located, served for a long time as a point of orientation for ships that arrived along the coast. Much like the early sailors, successive crews began calling the area as Porto Salvo (Saved Port).The chapel was consecrated to Nossa Senhora do Porto Salvo (Our Lady of Porto Salvo), and built by the early crews. In ruins for some time, it was reconstructed in the 18th century. The rustic porch-like facade has two azulejo panels, painted by António de Oliveira Bernardes, while its single-nave interior is decorated by azulejo tile dating to 1734. These tiles represent the life of the Virgin Mary, and the first years of the life of Jesus Christ.

Another temple, far simpler, but with an aesthetic quality also existed in the region, dedicated to Nossa Senhora do Socorro (Our Lady of Help/Aid), in Leião. This locality was one of the areas north of the old centre of Oeiras, in the 14th century. An 18th-century temple, the frontage is marked by several corners, a rustic porch, and the interior is reconstructed with dubious merit.

In 1679, by order of John V a fortress was constructed under the authority of the Count of Cantanhede, later Marquess of Marialva, who was responsible for the Tagus' defences and protection from Spanish attacks. The fort is located in the Paço de Arcos. Until the 18th century, Porto Salvo was an obscure locality, but integrated into the vintena da Caspolima. The location had no importance politically or economically.

It was the 1st Viscount of Porto Salvo, Henrique José da Costa, created by King Lous in 1872. His brother, Heliodoro Costa, was commission by King Miguel to collect money in Italy for his political cause, but died and his fortune passed to his brother (the first Viscount). Pinho Leal wrote of Henrique José da Costa Pereira: "The viscount had a magnificent estate in Como, Italy, and many properties in that kingdom. In Milan, he had a luxurious palace and beautiful house in Venice. In Portugal he was the owner of a palacette, in front of the Palace of the Count of Mesquitela. When he died, in Italy, the Viscount of Porto Salvo left behind an immense fortune to three nephews. One of the three descendants was a law student at the University of Coimbra, and the other two were officers in the army."

Until 10 June 1993 the locality of Porto Salvo was just another religious parish within the ecumenical parish of Nossa Senhora da Apresentação de Oeiras. Yet, owing to its level of development and concentration of population it was reconstituted; today, it is the second largest civil parish in the municipality, but one of its least populous. Established under Decree 17-J93, the parish was officially created on 11 June 1993 by the re-organization of sections of the parishes of Barcarena and Oeiras e São Julião da Barra. On 12 July 2001, owing to its size and number of prerequisite institutions (per Portuguese laws) it was granted the statute of vila (town).

== Economy ==
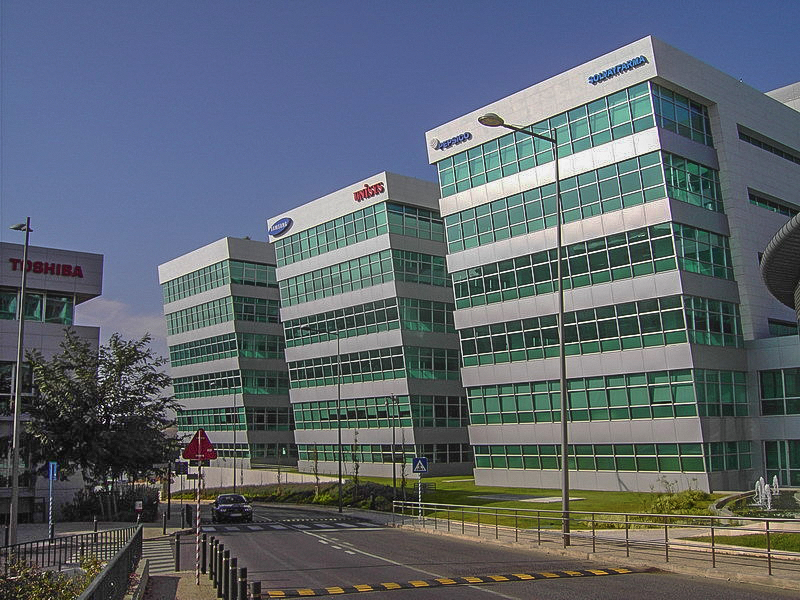
On the southern edge of Porto Salvo with the A5 motorway is the LagoasPark Business Park

Porto Salvo is home to Taguspark, the largest and most relevant Research and Development park in Portugal, housing several advanced technology start-ups, mostly in the information technology (IT) and biotechnology fields. This includes several facilities maintained by the Instituto Superior Técnico, several large-scale IT facilities, Millennium BCP and the former IBM/PT-SI co-hosting data-center. In addition to Taguspark, Porto Salvo also hosts some prominent office parks within Oeiras, including Lagoas Park and the Tagus Space.

Omni Aviation and TAP subsidiary White Airways also have their head offices in Port Salvo, including the Edifício Orange.

== Sport ==
There are several civic organizations established in Porto Salvo, of which the most relevant are Sociedade de Instrução Musical de Porto Salvo (Musical Instructional Society of Porto Salvo), Atlético Clube de Porto Salvo (Porto Salvo Athletic Club) and the Leões de Porto Salvo (Porto Salvo Lions) sports club.
