= António Câmara =

Portuguese civil engineer (born 1954)

António Câmara is a professor at the Faculdade de Ciências e Tecnologia da Universidade Nova de Lisboa and has been a visiting professor at both Cornell University (1988–89) and the Massachusetts Institute of Technology (1998–99). He was a Senior Consultant to the Expo '98 project and Senior Advisor to the National Geographical Information System (Sistema Nacional de Informação Geográfica). He was a member of the engineering team which studied and evaluated the Alqueva Dam's environmental impact. He has been YDreams CEO and founder since the company was created in June 2000. In 2006, Câmara was awarded with the Pessoa.

Câmara was awarded a licentiate degree in civil engineering from the Instituto Superior Técnico (University of Lisbon) and a doctorate degree from the Virginia Tech. He was a tennis player during his youth and was part of the under-18 and under-21 national tennis teams.
