= MotoStudent =

Biennial competition between students from universities

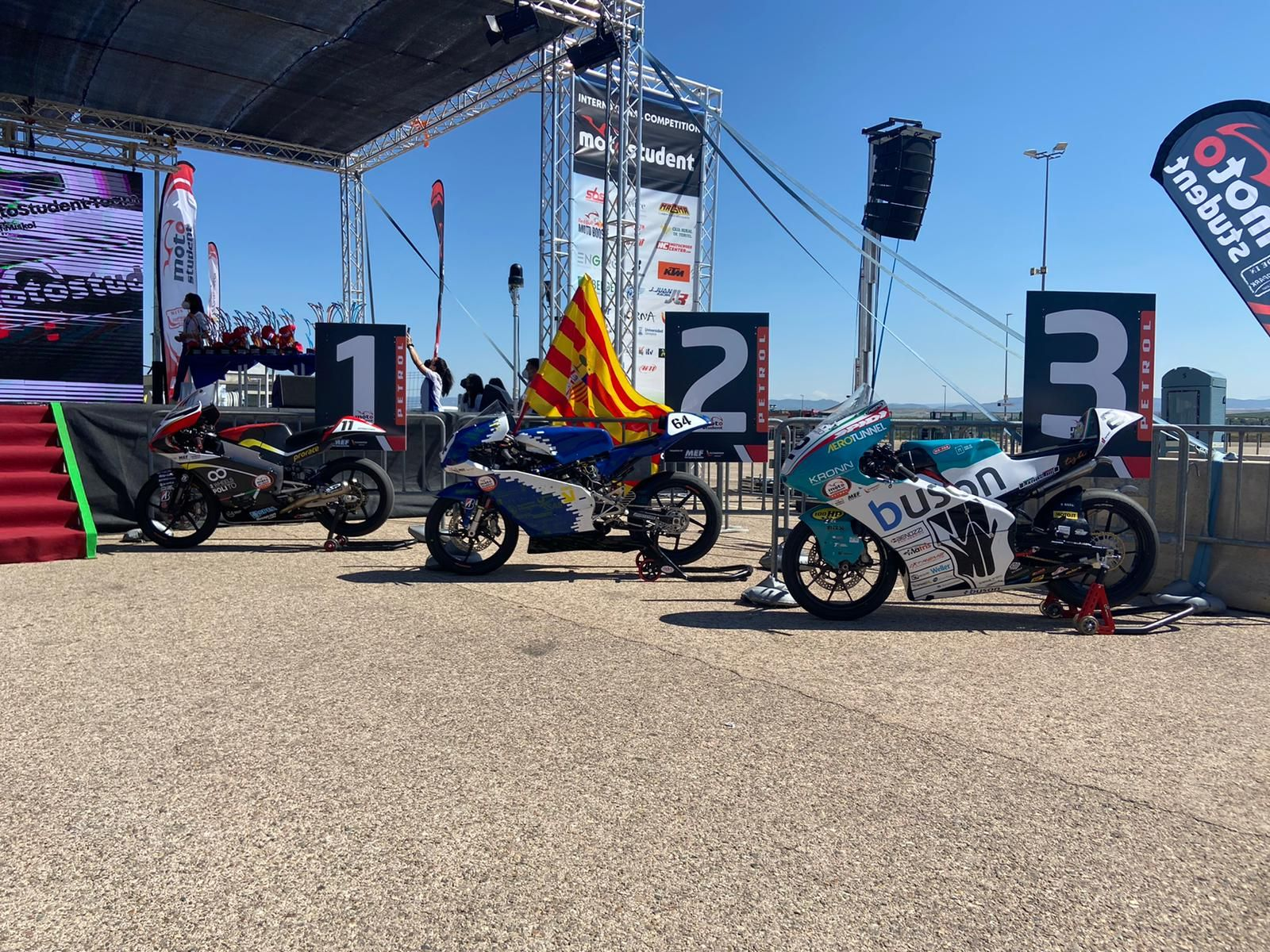
- Podium of "petrol" category at 6th edition.
- Category: Motorcycle sport
- Region: International
- Inaugural season: 2009
- Tyre suppliers: Dunlop Tyres

MotoStudent is a biennial competition between students from universities around the whole world that consist in that these students design, manufacture and develop a prototype of competition motorcycle over a year and a half.

Finally, these prototypes compete in an event at MotorLand Aragón, a circuit situated in Alcañiz, in Aragón, Spain.

Since the beginning of the competition, universities from 20 countries have participated in some edition.

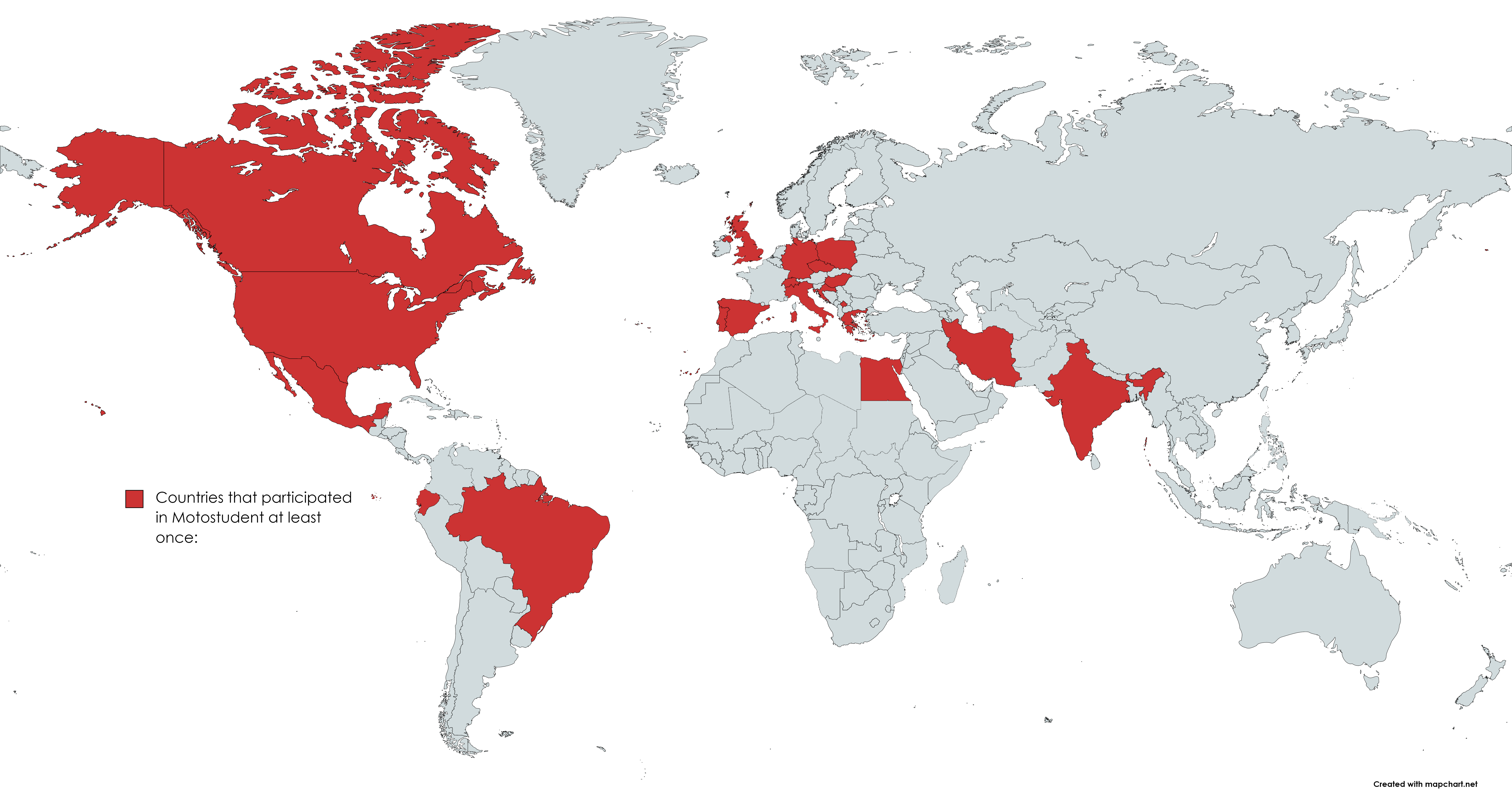
Countries with representation.

== History ==
This competition was born in Aragón, Spain, becoming an alternative to Formula SAE. On it, students must, on the one hand, present a viable project for the mass production of a motorcycle that they themselves design (calling this part of the competition as MS1), and on the other, manufacture the designed motorcycle, to later evaluate its performance in a final event alongside the rest of the participants (receiving the name of MS2).

Initially, the only existing category was for prototypes with petrol engine, being a 125 cc and 2-stroke engine from Gas Gas brand. This first edition, in which 23 teams participated, mostly Spanish and Italian, culminated in autumn 2010, with a final event on the MotorLand Aragón track, where the final event of the competition has been held each edition since.

The second edition took place between 2011 and 2012, with lower reception, as the number of registered teams was reduced to 18. In this new edition the regulations were adapted to become similar to the newly created moto3 category, replacing the engine used in the previous edition by a 4-stroke and 250 cc, this time, made by Yamaha.

In the third edition, held between 2013 and 2014, the number of participating teams increased to 33, consolidating this event at an international level. Sherco was the brand of the engines supplied to the participants on this occasion.

In the fourth edition, which took place between 2015 and 2016, a category for 100% electric prototypes was included for the first time. On this occasion, 35 teams are registered in the "petrol" category, powered by a Honda engine, while 17 new teams decide to venture into the newly created "electric" category.

The fifth edition, carried out between the years 2017 and 2018, represents the continuity of the competition in both categories, as it has a high acceptance by increasing to 47 teams registered in the petrol category, and to 27 in the electric. The brand that supplied the gasoline engines on this occasion was KTM.

The sixth edition should have been held between 2019 and 2020, but due to the exceptional situation derived from the COVID-19 pandemic, various postponements took place that lengthened the duration until 2021, with the competition taking place definitively in July of the year. 88 were the teams registered between the two categories, being the historical maximum of participation. To date, it has been the only edition in which an engine model has been repeated in the petrol category, being again supplied by KTM.

During the seventh edition, carried out between the years 2022 and 2023, 32 teams participated in the Petrol category and 48 in the Electric category. Also for this edition, the combustion engine is supplied by KTM (SXF 250cc); the electric motor, instead, by Circe.

The eighth edition of MotoStudent is now underway.

== List of winners ==
The prizes that are distributed in the competition are for the best project (MS1), the best design, the best innovation, the best team adding the points from MS1 plus those from MS2 (global), the best rookie, as well as the three first classified in the MS2 phase, as this is the most relevant as it reflects the behavior of the prototypes in competition.

Edition	Years	Category	MS1 (Project)	Design	Innovation	Global	Rookie
Edition	Years	Category	Team (University)	Team (University)	Team (University)	Team (University)	Team (University)
I	2009/2010	Petrol	(Spain) ETSIIT-UPNa Racing; Public University of Navarre	(Spain) UMA Racing; University of Málaga	(Spain) Moto Maq-Lab-Uc3m; University Carlos III of Madrid	–	–
II	2011/2012	Petrol	(Italy) 2WheelsPolito; Polytechnic University of Turin	(Spain) MS2 Uniovi; University of Oviedo	(Spain) UPM Motostudent; Polytechnic University of Madrid	–	–
III	2013/2014	Petrol	(Italy) 2WheelsPolito; Polytechnic University of Turin	(Spain) ETSEIB Racing; Polytechnic University of Catalonia	(Spain) EUPT Bikes; University of Zaragoza	–	–
IV	2015/2016	Petrol	(Spain) ETSEIB Racing; Polytechnic University of Catalonia	(Spain) MOTO-MAQLAB-UC3M; University Carlos III of Madrid	(Spain) Proyecto Guepardo; Miguel Hernández University of Elche	(Spain) ETSEIB Racing; Polytechnic University of Catalonia	–
IV	2015/2016	Electric	(Spain) EPSUJA TEAM; University of Jaén	(Spain) EUPT BIKES; University of Zaragoza	(Spain) UNIRIOJA; University of La Rioja	(Spain) EUPT BIKES; University of Zaragoza	–
V	2017/2018	Petrol	(Italy) Quartodilitro Unipd; University of Padua	(Greece) Typhoon MotoRacing UOWM; University of Western Macedonia	(Greece) Typhoon MotoRacing UOWM; University of Western Macedonia	(Italy) Polimi Motorcycle Factory; Polytechnic University of Milan	(Italy) Sapienza Gladiators RT; Sapienza University of Rome
V	2017/2018	Electric	(Spain) e-Ride ETSEIB; Polytechnic University of Catalonia	(Spain) UPM MotoStudent Electric; Polytechnic University of Madrid	(Germany) eLaketric - UAS Constance; University of Konstanz	(Spain) UMA RACING TEAM; University of Málaga	(Italy) UniBo Motorsport; University of Bologna
VI	2019/2021	Petrol	(Italy) 2WheelsPoliTO; Polytechnic University of Turin	(Italy) 2WheelsPoliTO; Polytechnic University of Turin	(Greece) Panther Racing Auth; Aristotle University of Thessaloniki	(Italy) 2WheelsPoliTO; Polytechnic University of Turin	(Italy) Stretto In Carena UNIME; University of Messina
VI	2019/2021	Electric	(Italy) Polimi Motorcycle Factory; Polytechnic University of Milan	(Italy) UniBo Motorsport; University of Bologna	(Italy) IMPULSE UNIMORE; University of Modena and Reggio Emilia	(Italy) UniBo Motorsport; University of Bologna	(Poland) LEM Wrocław; Wrocław University of Science and Technology
VII	2022/2023	Petrol	(Italy) 2WheelsPoliTO; Polytechnic University of Turin	(Germany) THM MotorSport Friedberg; University of Applied Sciences Mittelhessen	(Germany) THM MotorSport Friedberg; University of Applied Sciences Mittelhessen	(Italy) 2WheelsPoliTO; Polytechnic University of Turin	(Austria) Montan Factory Racing; University of Leoben
VII	2022/2023	Electric	(Italy) UniBo Motorsport; University of Bologna	(Italy) UniBo Motorsport; University of Bologna	(Italy) UniBo Motorsport; University of Bologna	(Italy) UniBo Motorsport; University of Bologna	(Italy) QuartoDiLitro UniPd; University of Padua

=== Podium in the "Petrol" MS2 category ===
Edition	Winner	University	Second	University	Third	University
I	(Spain) Alcañiz-Unizar	University of Zaragoza	(Spain) MotoUPCT	Universidad Politécnica de Cartagena	(Spain) MotostudentZGZ-Unizar	University of Zaragoza
II	(Spain) ETSEIB Racing	Polytechnic University of Catalonia	(Spain) EPSUJA Team	University of Jaén	(Italy) 2WheelsPolito	Polytechnic University of Turin
III	(Spain) UMH Moto-Experience	Miguel Hernández University of Elche	(Spain) UCO Racing	University of Córdoba	(Spain) Moto UBU	University of Burgos
IV	(Italy) 2WheelsPoliTO	Polytechnic University of Turin	(Spain) ETSEIB Racing	Polytechnic University of Catalonia	(Italy) QuartoDiLitro UniPd	University of Padua
V	(Italy) Polimi Motorcycle Factory	Polytechnic University of Milan	(Spain) Florida MotoTeam	Florida Universitaria	(Spain) Team Motoetsiuhu	University of Huelva
VI	(Italy) 2WheelsPoliTO	Polytechnic University of Turin	(Spain) Motostudent Unizar	University of Zaragoza	(Italy) QuartoDiLitro UniPd	University of Padua
VII	(Italy) 2WheelsPoliTO	Polytechnic University of Turin	(Spain) Florida MotoTeam	Florida Universitaria	(Austria) Montan Factory Racing	University of Leoben

=== Podium in the "Electric" MS2 category ===
Edition	Winner	University	Second	University	Third	University
IV	(Spain) MotoSpirit	Polytechnic University of Catalonia	(Spain) UPM Motostudent Electric	Polytechnic University of Madrid	(Spain) UJI Electric Racing Team	Jaume I University
V	(Spain) UMA RACING TEAM	University of Málaga	(Spain) UPM MotoStudent Electric	Polytechnic University of Madrid	(Italy) UniBo Motorsport	University of Bologna
VI	(Spain) UMA RACING TEAM	University of Málaga	(Italy) UniBo Motorsport	University of Bologna	(Spain) UPM MotoStudent Electric	Polytechnic University of Madrid
VII	(Italy) UniBo Motorsport	University of Bologna	(Italy) Polimi Motorcycle Factory	Polytechnic University of Milan	(Spain) UPM MotoStudent Electric	Polytechnic University of Madrid
