= Cristina Fonseca =

Portuguese entrepreneur and investor (born 1987)

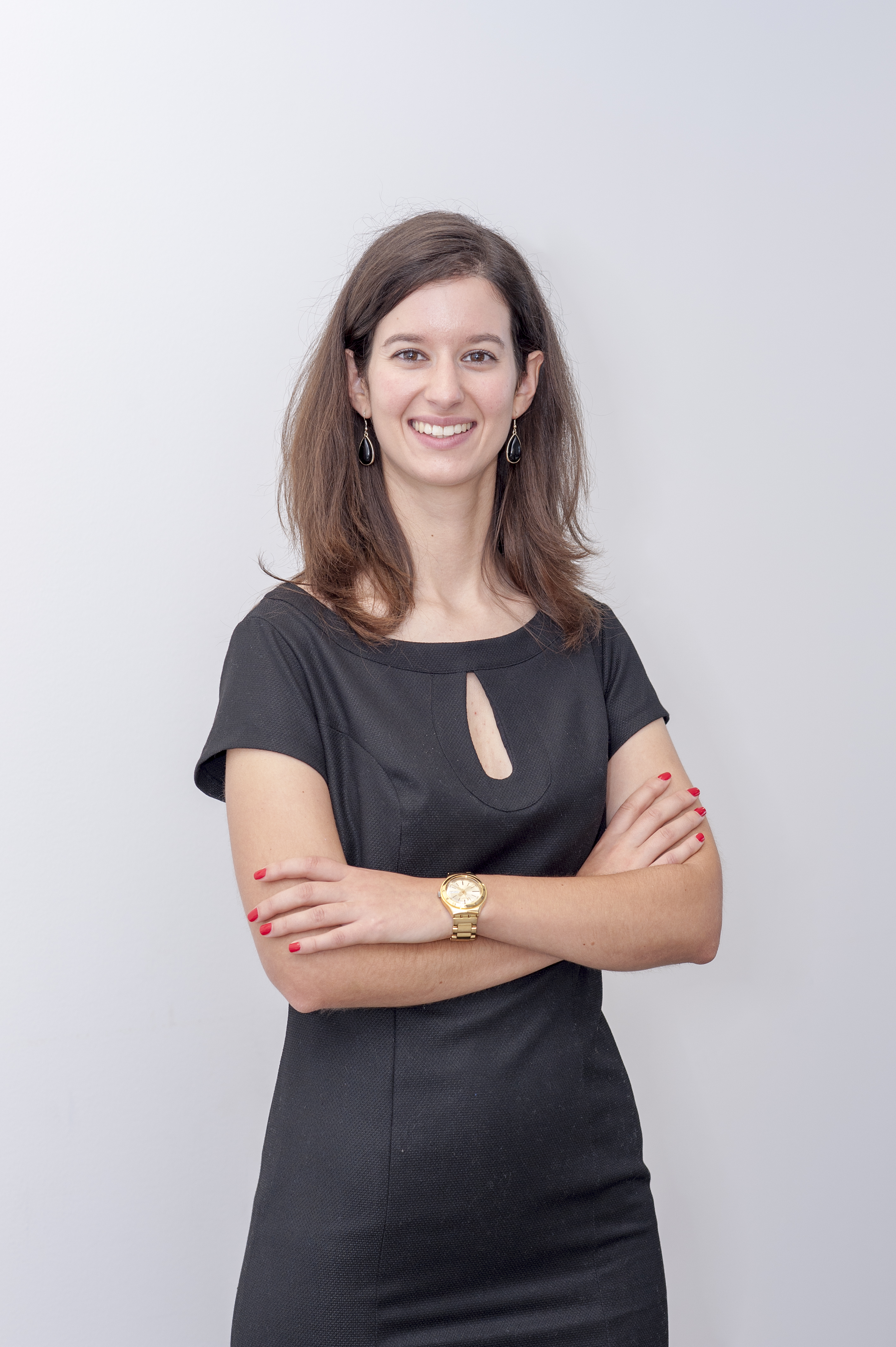
- Fonseca in 2013
- Born: November 14, 1987 (age 38); Cercal, Ourém, Portugal
- Occupation: Venture Partner of Indico Capital Partners

Cristina Fonseca is a Portuguese tech entrepreneur, angel investor and engineer, better known as one of the founders of Talkdesk, a cloud-based help desk software that became Portugal's third "unicorn" after raising US$100M in series B funding at a valuation of over US$1 billion in October 2018.

She is an alumna of the Instituto Superior Técnico of Lisbon where she studied telecommunications and networks engineering. Fonseca later did the Global Solutions Program at Singularity University and specialised in Artificial Intelligence.

In 2016 Fonseca was featured in the Forbes 30 Under 30 list under the enterprise technology category and in 2017 she became an Agenda Contributor to the World Economic Forum.

In 2018, Fonseca became a venture partner at Indico Capital Partners, the first Portuguese private venture capital fund investing in Portugal and Spain early-stage, tech-focused startups.
