= INESC-ID =

Research institution in Lisbon, Portugal

- Established: 2000
- Address: Rua Alves Redol, 9
- Location: Lisbon, Portugal
- Coordinates: 38.7362113°N 9.1410125°W
- Interactive map of INESC-ID
- Website: www.inesc-id.pt

The Instituto de Engenharia de Sistemas e Computadores - Investigação e Desenvolvimento (INESC-ID, English: Institute of Systems and Computer Engineering - Research and Development) is a non-profit, privately owned institution of public interest, in Lisbon, Portugal, dedicated to advanced research and development in the domains of electronics, energy, telecommunications and information technologies. It was awarded the status of Associate Laboratory of the Portuguese Ministry for Science and Technology in 2005.

== History and organization ==
INESC-ID was founded in 2000, from a branch of the Instituto de Engenharia de Sistemas e Computadores (INESC), and was awarded in 2005 with the status of "Laboratório Associado". The founding associates are INESC and Instituto Superior Técnico (IST), the engineering school of the University of Lisbon.

Since its inception, INESC-ID has been involved in several research projects and contracts at national and international level. INESC-ID has participated in more than 50 research projects funded by the European Union, being responsible for and coordinating at least 4, and more than 190 by national entities.

The general management of the organization is ensured by the Board of Directors, designated by the general Council, and by the President of the Scientific Council.

== Research areas ==
With the aim of advancing the state of the art in computers, energy, telecommunications, and information systems, more than 100 PhD researchers and 200 other fellows and technical staff, mainly with electrical engineering and computer science background, organize their activities in 11 main research areas:

- Artificial Intelligence for People and Society;
- Automated Reasoning and Software Reliability;
- Communication Networks;
- Distributed, Parallel and Secure Systems;
- Graphics and Interaction;
- Green Energy and Smart Converters;
- High-Performance Computing Architectures and Systems;
- Human Language Technologies;
- Information and Decision Support Systems;
- Nano-Electronic Circuits and Systems;
- Sustainable Power Systems.
