= Coastal Engineering Journal =

- Discipline: coastal engineering
- Language: English

Publication details
- Publisher: Taylor & Francis (Japan)
- Impact factor: 0.887 (2016)

Standard abbreviations
- ISO 4: Coast. Eng. J.

Indexing
- ISSN: 0578-5634 (print); 1793-6292 (web)

Links
- Journal homepage

Coastal Engineering Journal is a peer-reviewed scientific journal covering achievements and engineering practices in the fields of coastal, harbor and offshore engineering. The journal is published by Taylor & Francis, and is intended to cover "not only fundamental studies on analytical models, numerical computation and laboratory experiments, but also results of field measurements and case studies of real projects" . It was founded in 1958 under the title Coastal Engineering in Japan, taking on its present name in the 1990s.

== Abstracting and indexing ==
The journal is indexed in

- Science Citation Index Expanded
- ISI Alerting Services
- Cambridge Scientific Index
- Environment Abstracts
- CSA Selected Water Resources Abstracts
- CSA Oceanic Abstracts
- CSA Health and Safety Abstracts
- CSA Aquatic Sciences and Fisheries Abstracts (ASFA)
- Current Contents/Engineering, Computing and Technology
- Compendex
