= Instituto Superior Técnico =

Public school of engineering and technology in Lisbon, Portugal

Coordinates: 38°44′12″N 9°08′20″W

Instituto Superior Técnico MHSE • MHIP
- Other names: Técnico, IST
- Type: Public research university
- Established: 23 May 1911; 115 years ago
- Parent institution: University of Lisbon
- Academic affiliations: ATHENS, CESAER, CLUSTER, Heritage Network, Magalhães Network, PEGASUS, SEEEP, T.I.M.E., TPC
- President: Rogério Colaço
- Academic staff: 1,073 (June 2023)
- Students: 11,296 (June 2023)
- Location: Lisbon metropolitan area, Portugal
- Campus: Urban
- Colours: Cyan and White
- Website: https://tecnico.ulisboa.pt/en/

The Instituto Superior Técnico (IST, also known as Técnico, and stylized TÉCNICO LISBOA; English: Higher Technical Institute) is the school of engineering and technology of the University of Lisbon. It was founded as an autonomous school in 1911, and was integrated into the Technical University of Lisbon (now part of the University of Lisbon) in 1930. IST is the largest school of engineering in Portugal by number of enrolled students, faculty size, scientific production and patents.

IST has three campuses, all located in the Lisbon metropolitan area: the Alameda campus in Lisbon, the Taguspark campus in the Oeiras municipality, and the Tecnológico e Nuclear campus in the Loures municipality. The school is divided in 11 departments that are responsible for teaching undergraduate and postgraduate programs. Each department is organized in sections, which group together specific subjects within its scientific area. In addition, the laboratories of the several departments support the teaching and research activities carried out at IST.

IST is a member of several university partnerships, including CLUSTER, CESAER, T.I.M.E., TPC, and the ATHENS Programme.

== History ==
The Instituto Superior Técnico (IST) was created from the split of the Lisbon Commercial and Industrial Institute (IICL) into two schools. Following the implantation of the Republic in Portugal in 1910, Alfredo Bensaúde, a professor of Mineralogy and Geology at the IICL, was invited by Manuel de Brito Camacho, Minister of Development in the Provisional Government, to create and lead a new technical school, as part of nationwide education reforms. A decree approved on 23 May 1911 and published in the Diário do Governo declared that the IICL would be split into two schools: the Instituto Superior do Comércio (current Lisbon School of Economics and Management) and the Instituto Superior Técnico.

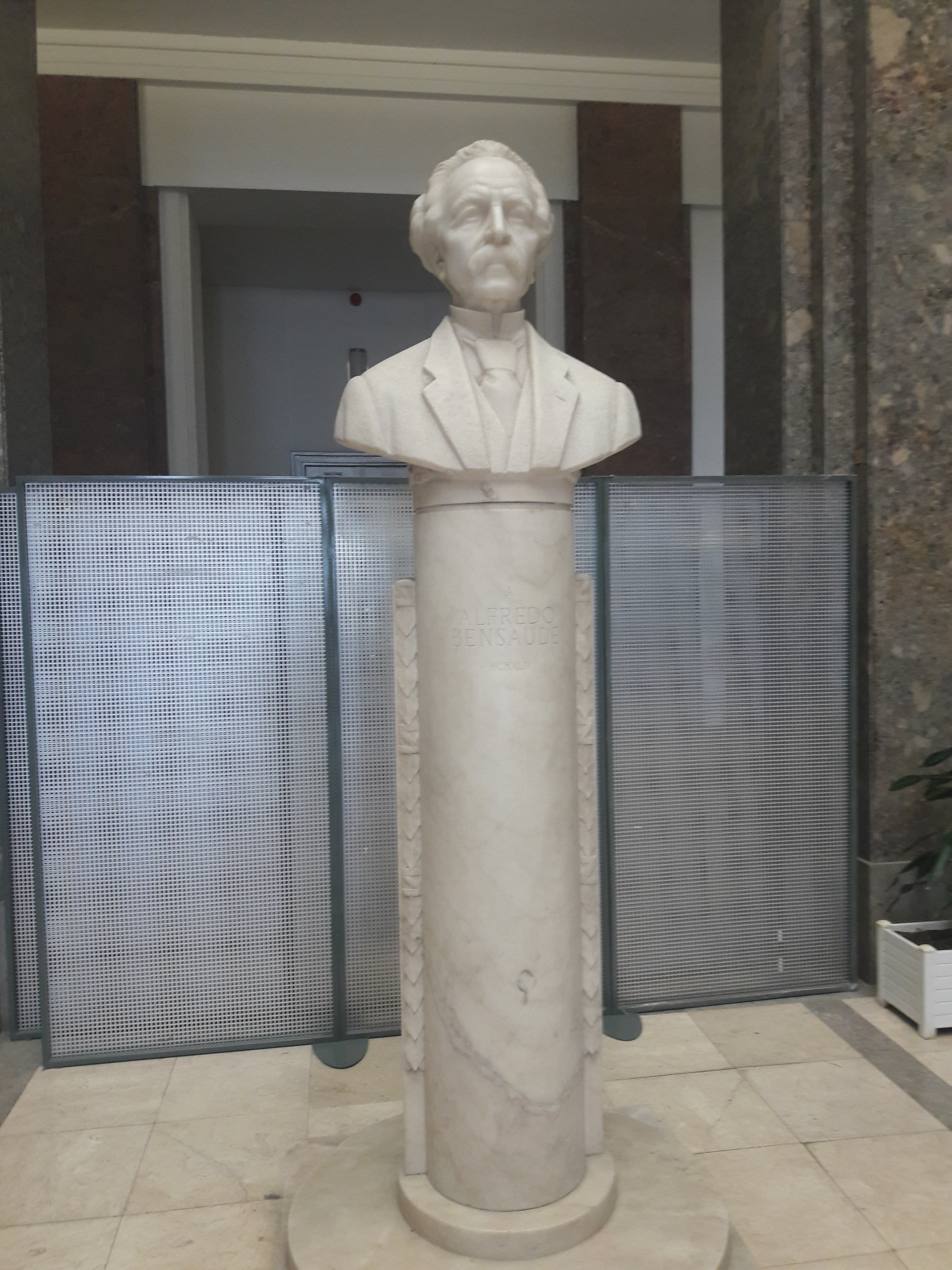
Bust of Alfredo Bensaúde, first director of IST, in the Central Pavilion

Alfredo Bensaúde was the first director of IST, a position he held from 1911 to 1920. He implemented its first pedagogical program, which had five engineering courses: mining engineering, civil engineering, mechanical engineering, electrical engineering, and chemical-industrial engineering. Under his direction, there was an investment in theoretical-practical teaching where workshops and laboratories, as well as the library, played an essential role. He also noted for recruiting foreign teachers, which he considered to have an essential role in organizing some of the courses.

The first facilities of IST were located in the Rua da Boavista in Lisbon. In 1927, Duarte Pacheco became director of IST and started the project for a new campus for the school. He requested the design to architect Porfírio Pardal Monteiro, who counted with the collaboration of Luís Benavente, a fellow architect, in the project. The construction of the Alameda campus started in 1928 and was finished in 1935, with the inauguration happening the following year. IST became the first academic institution in Portugal with its own campus. In the meantime, in 1930, IST became part of the newly created Technical University of Lisbon.

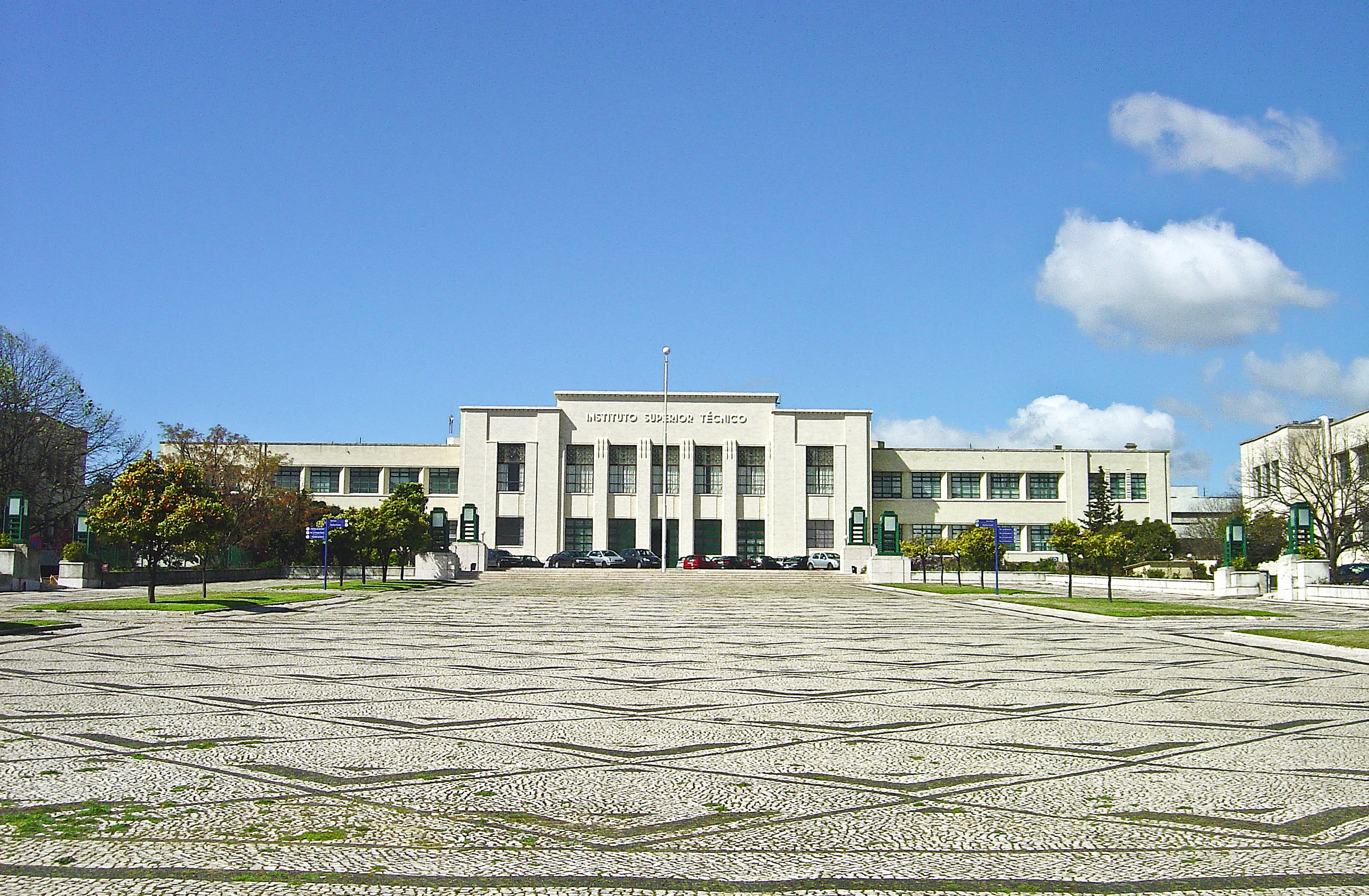
Central Pavilion of the Alameda campus, the main building of IST

In 1948, IST hosted the "Fifteen Years of Public Works" exhibition, an event organized by the Portuguese State to exhibit the new infrastructures built in the first 15 years of the Estado Novo. The statue of a woman holding a square and compass, by Salvador Barata Feyo, placed in the northern side of the campus, is a sculpture from this exhibition that was permanently added to the Alameda campus.

Between 1952 and 1972, 12 study centres were established in Portugal, three of them at IST, in the fields of Chemistry, Geology and Mineralogy, and Electronics. These centres were responsible for promoting faculty training and scientific qualification through doctoral studies in universities and research centres abroad.

In 1970, the minimum period for obtaining a bachelor's degree decreased from six to five years, and the number of students enrolled at IST significantly increased. During the 1970s, scientific research at IST also has a major increase, through the creation of the Interdisciplinary Complex building in 1973, which gathered together various autonomous research units.

During the 1990s, more engineering courses, including Master and PhD degrees, were added to IST's curricular offer. The facilities in the Alameda campus had the greatest expansion in this decade, with the construction of the Civil Engineering and Architecture Pavilion and the North and South towers.

In 2000, IST inaugurated a new campus in the municipality of Oeiras, specifically in the Taguspark, the first Portuguese science and technology park. In the academic year 2006–2007, the Declaration of Bologna was successfully implemented for all IST programmes, reducing the time to obtain a bachelor's degree to three years. In 2012, the Tecnológico e Nuclear campus was added to IST, following the discontinuation of the Technological and Nuclear Institute.

Today IST is involved with several of Portugal's research, development and technology transfer institutions and offers a vast number of degrees in science and engineering areas, at undergraduate, master and doctoral levels. IST is also part of several networks and international programmes to promote student mobility, both at undergraduate and postgraduate levels.

== Campuses and facilities ==
IST has three campuses: the Alameda campus in Lisbon, the Taguspark campus in the Oeiras municipality, and the Tecnológico e Nuclear campus in the Loures municipality.

=== Alameda campus ===
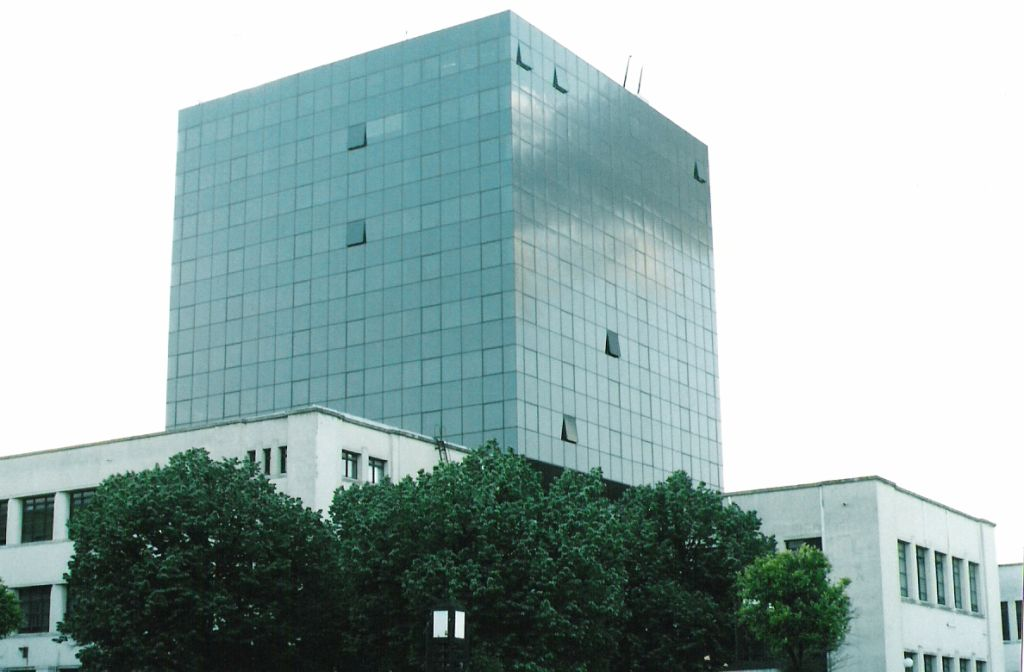
North tower of the Alameda campus

The Alameda campus is the primary location of IST. It was inaugurated in 1936 as the first dedicated university campus in Portugal. It is located in the freguesia of Areeiro, in Lisbon.

The campus originally had seven buildings. Throughout the years, new buildings were constructed inside the campus, expanding the facilities of IST. Some of the buildings added after 1936 include:

- The Interdisciplinary Complex, opened in 1973;
- The Civil Engineering and Architecture Pavilion, opened in 1993;
- The North Tower, opened in 1994;
- The South Tower, opened in 2000;
- The Social Action Pavilion, opened in 2003.

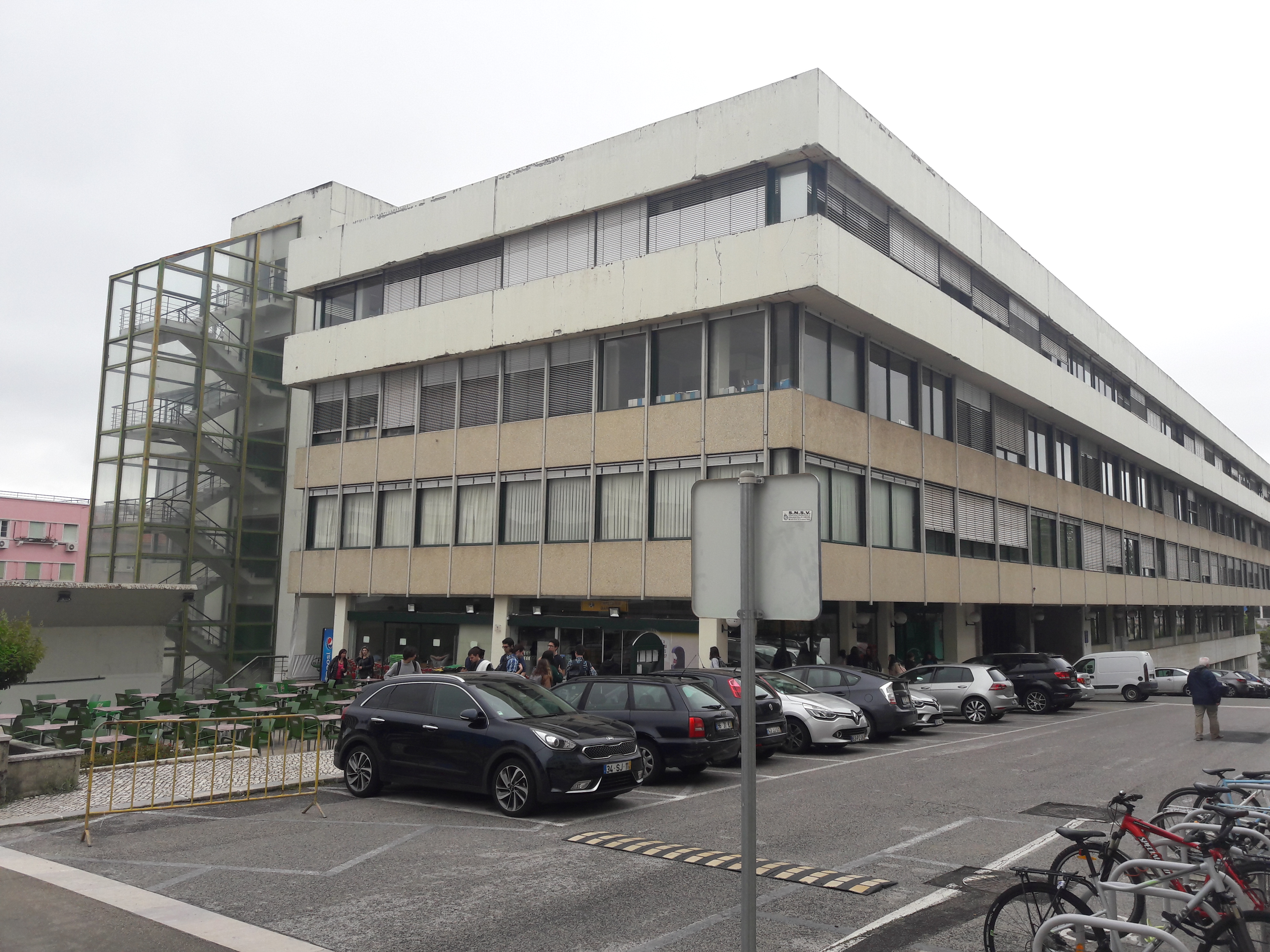
Civil Engineering and Architecture Pavilion, in the Alameda campus

Currently the campus has a total of 26 buildings. Apart from lecture and research buildings, it includes a dedicated canteen building, a building for the students' association, playing fields for sports, an indoor swimming pool, and a kindergarten.

=== Taguspark campus ===
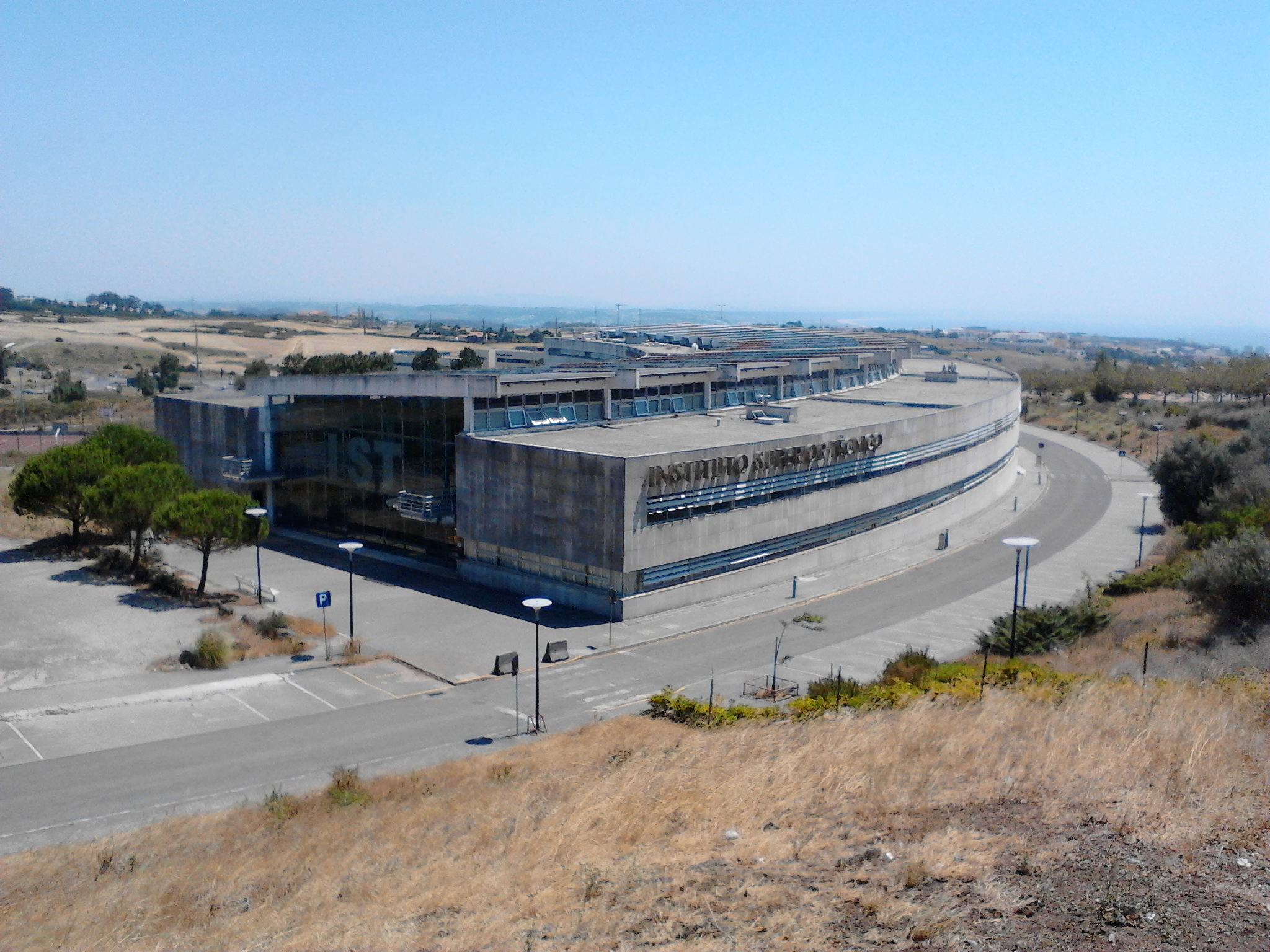
Taguspark campus in Porto Salvo

IST inaugurated a second campus in the Taguspark, a science and technology park in Porto Salvo, in the Oeiras municipality, in 2000. The campus consists of a main building, a sports field and a hall of residence.

Taguspark is located about 14 km to the west of the Alameda campus. A free shuttle bus service connecting the Alameda and Taguspark campuses is available for exclusive use of the IST community.

As of the academic year 2023–2024, three bachelor's degree programmes and five master's degree programmes are lectured in the Taguspark campus.

=== Tecnológico e Nuclear campus ===
The Tecnológico e Nuclear campus was added to IST in 2012. It is located in Bobadela, in the municipality of Loures, about 9 km northeast of the Alamada campus. Prior to its addition to IST, the campus belonged to the Technological and Nuclear Institute (Portuguese: Instituto Tecnológico e Nuclear), which was extinguished in December 2011 by governmental decree.

The campus contained the only nuclear reactor in Portugal, which was used for more than 50 years for scientific research. The reactor was stopped on 11 May 2016 and dismantled in 2019.

As of the academic year 2023–2024, two master's degree programmes use the facilities in this campus: Radiation Protection and Safety, and Science and Technology for the Cultural Heritage.

=== Halls of residence ===
IST has two official halls of residence for its students:

- The Eng. Duarte Pacheco residence, located in the freguesia of Parque das Nações, which opened in 1998 for students in the Alameda campus.
- The Prof. Ramôa Ribeiro residence, located in the Taguspark campus, which opened in 2013 for students in this campus.

== Education ==
As of the academic year 2023–2024, IST offers undergraduate and postgraduate degrees in the following domains:

- Aerospace engineering
- Applied mathematics and computation
- Architecture
- Biological engineering
- Biomedical engineering
- Chemical engineering
- Civil engineering
- Computer science and engineering
- Data science
- Electrical and computer engineering
- Electronics engineering
- Engineering physics
- Environmental engineering
- Industrial engineering and management
- Materials engineering
- Mechanical engineering
- Mining and geological engineering
- Naval architecture and ocean engineering
- Telecommunications and informatics engineering

IST is also actively involved in several networks and international programs to promote student mobility, both at undergraduate and postgraduate levels. Through a large number of agreements with other institutions worldwide, IST students can join double degree programmes and joint PhD programmes with universities in Europe, the United States, Brazil, and Israel.

== Affiliations ==
IST is a member of several academic and scientific networks and associations, including:

- Advanced Technology Higher Education Network (ATHENS)
- Conference of European Schools for Advanced Engineering Education and Research (CESAER), a non-profit association of leading engineering universities in Europe
- Consortium Linking Universities of Science and Technology for Education and Research (CLUSTER), a network of leading European universities of technology
- Heritage Network, a network of European and Indian technical higher education institutions
- Magalhães Network, a network of European, Latin American and Caribbean universities
- Partnership of a European Group of Aeronautics and Space Universities (PEGASUS)
- Sino-European Engineering Education Platform (SEEEP), a collaboration between the members of CLUSTER and Chinese universities in the areas of science, technology and engineering
- Top International Managers in Engineering (T.I.M.E.)

== Student activities ==
IST students have a variety of groups and activities that they can join.

=== Students' association ===
The students' association of the Instituto Superior Técnico (AEIST, Portuguese: Associação dos Estudantes do Instituto Superior Técnico) is the organization that represents and supports the students of IST. It was established on 11 December 1911, when IST was just 8 months old.

In the present day, the AEIST organizes activities and initiatives in the areas of social responsibility, culture, sports, training, employability and recreation.

=== Sports ===
IST and its students' association are represented in various sports.

The most notable sports team from IST is the Clube de Rugby do Técnico, a rugby union club founded in 1963. The club has become three-times champion of the top-tier rugby league in Portugal (most recently in the 2020–2021 season), four-times winner of the Portuguese Rugby Cup, and winner of the Portuguese Super Cup in 1994.

The students' association competes in basketball (men/women), chess, futsal (men/women), handball (men/women), karting, padel, rugby sevens (men), squash, table tennis, tennis, and volleyball (men/women).

=== Tunas ===
IST has three tunas:

- Tuna Universitária do Instituto Superior Técnico (TUIST), the male tuna, established in 1993
- Tuna Feminina do Instituto Superior Técnico (TFIST), the female tuna, established in 1994
- Tuna Mista do Instituto Superior Técnico (TMIST), a mixed tuna based in the Taguspark campus, established in 2006

The TUIST organizes each year the International Tunas Festival of the City of Lisbon, which is held at the Coliseu dos Recreios in Lisbon.

=== Other groups ===
Notable student groups in IST are:

- BEST Lisboa, local group of the Board of European Students of Technology, formed in 1989 as one of the 12 founding groups
- Diferencial, the IST students' newspaper, established in 1991
- Formula Student Lisboa (FST Lisboa), a Formula racing engineering team that competes in Formula Student competitions, established in 2001
- Grupo de Estratégia, Simulação e Táctica (GEST), focused on event coordination around wargames, board games, tabletop and trading card games.
- Grupo de Teatro do Instituto Superior Técnico (GTIST), the theatre group of IST, first active from 1960 to 1971 and revived in 1992
- HackerSchool, a hackerspace started in 2012, centered on the development of various engineering projects themed around free software and open hardware.
- JUNITEC, junior enterprise of IST, established in 1990
- Núcleo de Arte Fotográfica (NAF), artistic photography group of IST, established in the 1950s
- Projecto de Sustentabilidade Energética Móvel (PSEM), an engineering team that designs and builds electric vehicles to compete in the Greenpower racing competitions, established in 2013
- Técnico Solar Boat, an engineering team established in 2015 that develops solar, hydrogen and autonomous boats
- TLMoto, a sports motorcycle engineering team that competes in MotoStudent, established in 2012

=== Recurring events ===
Some of the most notable recurring events organized by students of IST are:

- Arraial do Técnico, a music festival that takes place at the Alameda campus at the start of the academic year, organized by the AEIST
- SINFO, a tech conference organized by a dedicated team. Takes place annually since 1993

== Reputation ==
=== Rankings ===
The University of Lisbon, which IST is part of, is the institution represented in global university rankings. Nevertheless, IST is represented indirectly in the rankings for the specific subjects of engineering and technology.

QS World University Rankings by subject 2023 – University of Lisbon
Subject	Global rank	National rank
Engineering and technology	183	1
Chemical engineering	101–150	1–2
Civil and structural engineering	51–100	1–2
Computer science and information systems	201–250	1
Electrical and electronic engineering	151–200	1–2
Mechanical, aeronautical, and manufacturing engineering	137	1
Petroleum engineering	51–100	—

ARWU global ranking of academic subjects 2023 – University of Lisbon
Subject	Global rank	National rank
Biomedical engineering	201–300	2–3
Civil engineering	36	1
Chemical engineering	201–300	3
Computer science and engineering	201–300	1
Electrical and electronic engineering	201–300	1
Environmental science and engineering	201–300	1–3
Materials science and engineering	401–500	2–3
Mechanical engineering	151–200	1–2
Marine/ocean engineering	4	1

THE World University Rankings 2023 by subject – University of Lisbon
Subject	Global rank	National rank
Computer science	501–600	3
Engineering	401–500	1–2

=== Employability ===
In a survey conducted in 2022 to 1450 IST postgraduates who graduated during the year 2020, 96.7% of the inquired indicated that they were employed, 80.4% reported that they got employed within 6 months of their graduation, and 73.6% indicated that they are working in their field of study.

=== Criticism ===
IST has a reputation for the high level of difficulty of its courses, which results in a considerable number of dropouts in the undergraduate courses. Students and graduates have criticized some of the courses' programmes for being too focused on theory and lacking practical training.

A 2021 survey to IST students, which gathered 1,987 responses, revealed that 16% of the students felt that they had been target of moral harassment and 5% had been target of sexual harassment.

== Notable alumni ==
IST alumni have held prominent positions in politics, research organizations and the business sector, in Portugal and internationally. Three Prime Ministers of Portugal were IST alumni, of which one (António Guterres) currently serves as the Secretary-General of the United Nations.

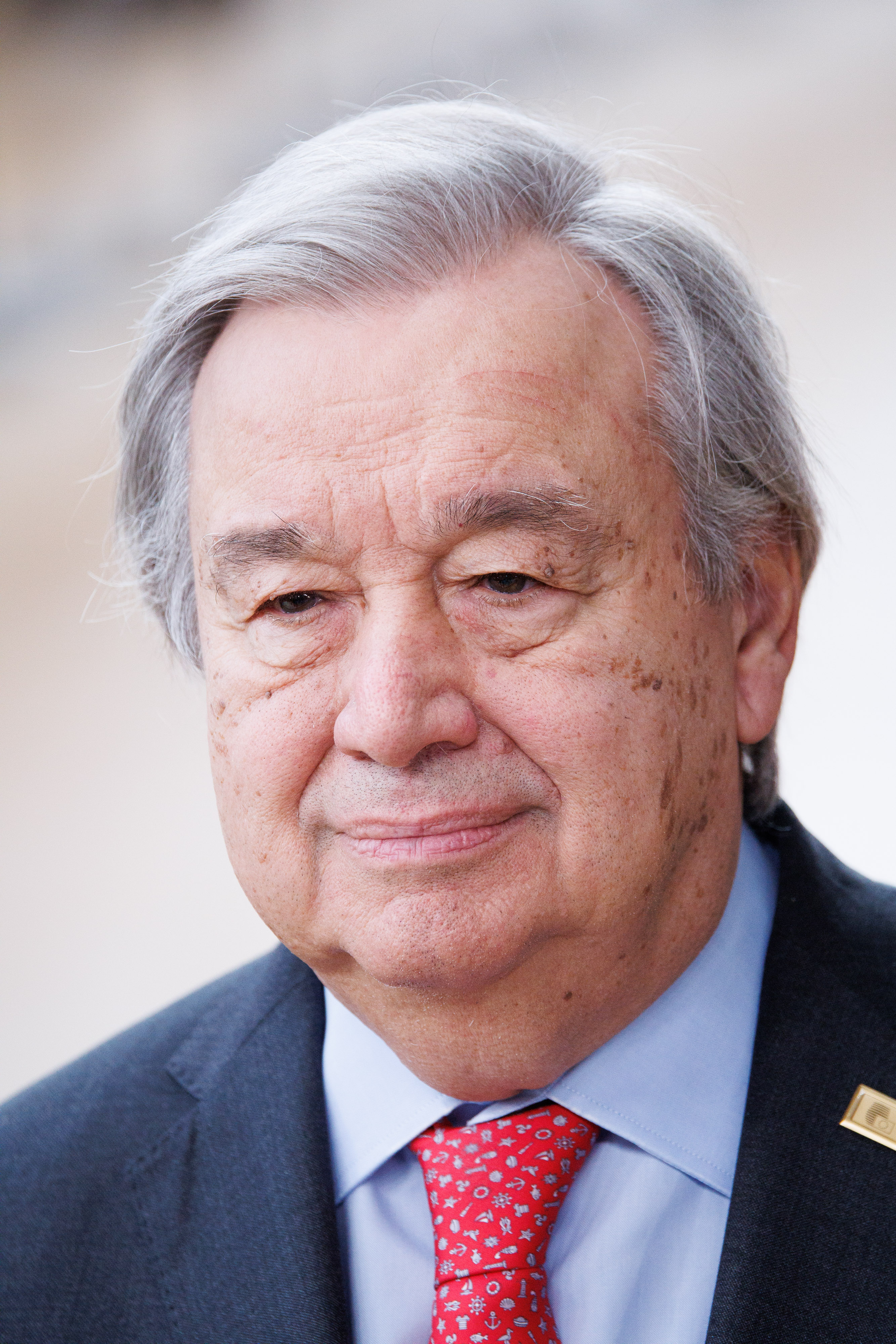
António Guterres, current Secretary-General of the United Nations, licenciatura degree in electrical engineering in 1971

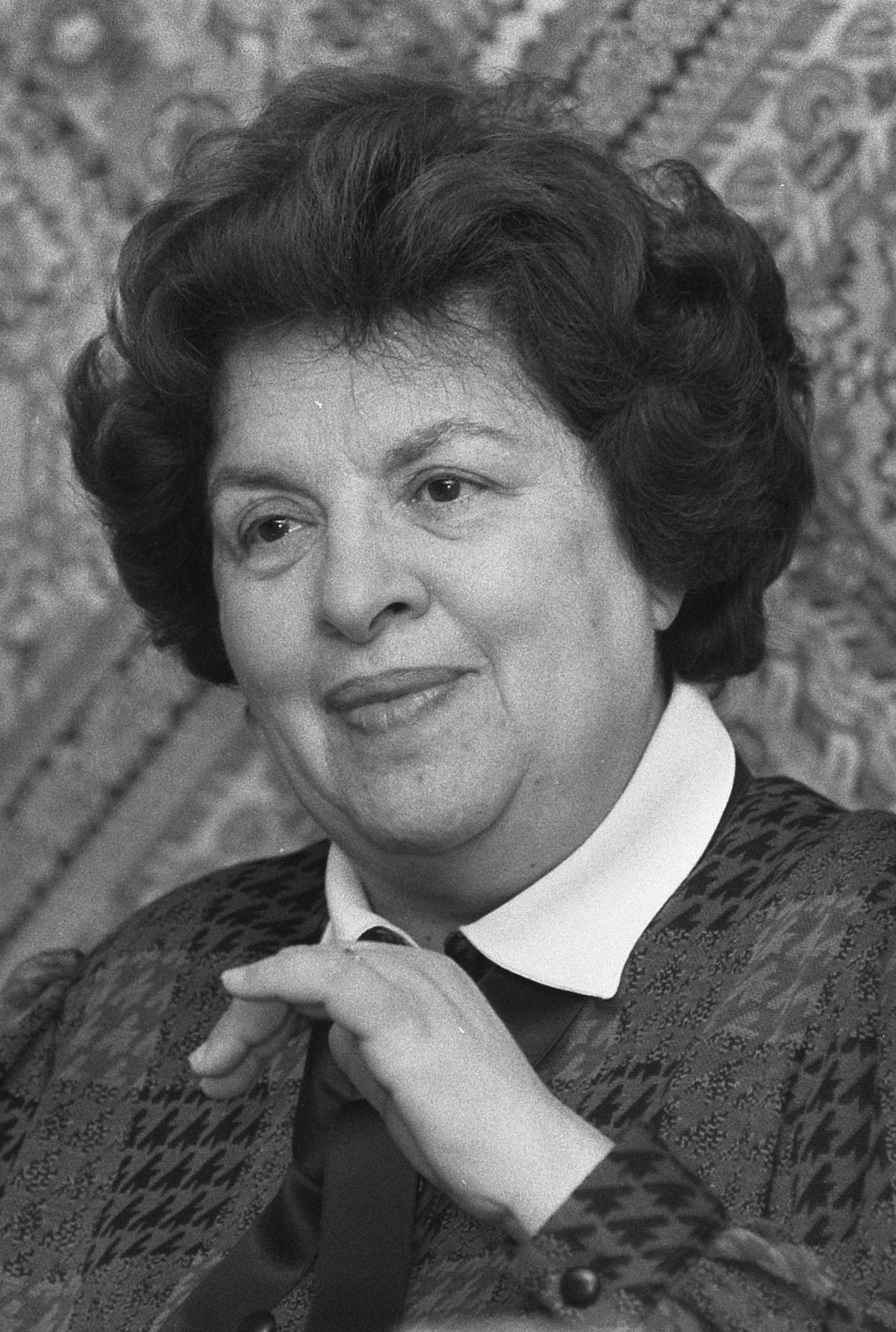
Maria de Lourdes Pintasilgo, first woman to serve as Prime Minister of Portugal, licenciatura degree in chemical-industrial engineering in 1953

Academics, researchers and inventors

- António Câmara (Lic. civil engineering, 1977) – researcher in virtual and augmented reality, co-founder and former CEO of YDreams, professor at the NOVA School of Science and Technology
- Maria Amélia Chaves (Lic. civil engineering, 1937) – first female civil engineer to graduate from IST, first Portuguese woman to graduate and then work in civil engineering, and the first Portuguese female engineer to work in the field.
- Raul Pires Ferreira Chaves (Lic. civil engineering, early 1920s) – civil engineer, inventor of the MURUS system (a precursor of current modular construction systems)
- Pedro Domingos (electrical and computer engineering, Lic. 1988, M.Sc. 1992) – researcher in machine learning, professor emeritus at the University of Washington, author of The Master Algorithm
- Mário A. T. Figueiredo (electrical and computer engineering, Lic. 1986, M.Sc. 1989, Ph.D. 1994) – academic and researcher, Distinguished Professor at IST
- Isabel Gago (Lic. in chemical engineering, 1939) – second woman to study engineering in Portugal and first woman to teach chemical engineering in Portugal
- Nuno Loureiro (MSc in engineering physics, 2000) – plasma physicist, director of the MIT Plasma Science and Fusion Center from 2024 until his murder in 2025
- João Arménio Correia Martins (Lic. civil engineering, 1976) – researcher in solid mechanics and biomechanics, professor in IST's Department of Civil Engineering and Architecture from 1986 to 2008
- João Pavão Martins (Lic. mechanical engineering, 1976; M.Sc. computer science, 1979) – co-founder of SISCOG, researcher in artificial intelligence and full professor of Computer Science and Engineering at IST
- Nuno Maulide (Lic. chemical engineering, 2003) – full professor of organic synthesis at the University of Vienna, Austria's Scientist of the Year 2019
- André Neves (Lic. applied mathematics and computation, 1999) – mathematician, professor at the University of Chicago, co-solver of the Willmore conjecture and the Freedman–He–Wang conjecture
- Arlindo Oliveira (electrical and computer engineering, Lic. 1986, M.Sc. 1989) – current president of INESC, former president of IST (2012–2019), former director of the INESC-ID (2000–2009)
- Isabel Ribeiro, (born 1955), robotics engineer
- José Tribolet (Lic. electrical engineering, 1971) – retired full professor of Information Systems at IST, co-founder and chairman of INESC-ID
- Fernando Vasco Costa (civil engineering, 1936) - civil engineer specialising in port engineering and berthing of ships, rector of the Technical University of Lisbon from 1969 to 1972.
- Manuela Veloso (electrical engineering, Lic. 1980, M.Sc. 1984) – researcher in robotics and artificial intelligence, professor at the Carnegie Mellon University

Entrepreneurs and businesspeople

- Cristina Fonseca (M.Sc. communication networks engineering, 2011) – co-founder of Talkdesk and investor
- Diogo Mónica (M.Sc. communication networks engineering, 2009; PhD computer science, 2015) – co-founder of Anchorage Digital
- Stephan Morais (Lic. civil engineering, 1996) – investor, first Portuguese to be nominated a Young Global Leader by the World Economic Forum
- Ernesto Morgado (Lic. mechanical engineering, 1976; M.Sc. computer science, 1981) – co-founder of SISCOG, president of Ernesto Morgado S.A., retired professor at IST's Computer Engineering department
- Paulo Neves (Lic. electrical engineering) – former CEO of Altice Portugal (2015–2017)
- José Bento dos Santos (Lic. chemical-industrial engineering, 1970) – businessman, trader, metals broker, cook and gastronome
- Isabel Vaz (Lic. chemical-industrial engineering, 1990), executive chair of Luz Saúde, one of the largest healthcare companies in Portugal.

Politicians and diplomats

- Álvaro Barreto (Lic. civil engineering, 1959) – various ministerial roles between 1978 and 1990, and Minister of the Economy from 2004 to 2005
- Maria da Graça Carvalho (Lic. mechanical engineering, 1978) – Minister of the Environment and Energy since 2024, former Minister of Science and Higher Education (2003–2005)
- Ângelo Correia (Lic. chemical-industrial engineering, 1968) – Minister of Internal Administration (1981–1983)
- Adelino Amaro da Costa (Lic. civil engineering, 1966) – Minister of National Defense (1980)
- Alfredo Bruto da Costa (Lic. civil engineering, 1963) – Minister of Social Coordination and Social Affairs (1979–1980)
- Alfredo Nobre da Costa (Lic. mechanical engineering, 1946) – Prime Minister of Portugal (1978), Minister of Industry and Technology (1977–1978)
- Luis Veiga da Cunha (civil engineering, Lic. 1959, PhD 1971) – Minister of Education (1979–1980)
- João Pedro Matos Fernandes (M.Sc. transports, 1995) – Minister of the Environment (2015–2022)
- Mariano Gago (Lic. electrical engineering, 1971) – Minister of Science, Technology and Higher Education (1995–2002, 2005–2011)
- António Guterres (Lic. electrical engineering, 1971) – Secretary-General of the United Nations since 2017, former Prime Minister of Portugal (1995–2002), former president of the Socialist International (1999–2005) and former United Nations High Commissioner for Refugees (2005–2015)
- Miguel Pinto Luz (Lic. electrical and computer engineering, 2000) – Minister of Infrastructure and Housing since 2024
- Carlos Moedas (Lic. civil engineering, 1993) – Mayor of Lisbon since 2021
- Duarte Pacheco (Lic. electrical engineering, 1926) – various ministerial roles between 1928 and 1943, director of IST (1929–1932, 1936–1937)
- Dulce Pássaro (Lic. chemical engineering, 1976) – Minister of the Environment and Spatial Planning (2009–2011)
- Maria de Lourdes Pintasilgo (Lic. chemical-industrial engineering, 1953) – first woman to serve as Prime Minister of Portugal (1979–1980)
- João de Deus Pinheiro (Lic. chemical-industrial engineering, 1970) – Minister of Education and Culture (1985–1987), Minister of Foreign Affairs (1987–1992), European Commissioner between 1993 and 1999
- João Fraústo da Silva (Lic. chemical-industrial engineering, 1958) – Minister of Education (1982–1983), director of IST (1970–1972)

== See also ==
- University of Lisbon
- C. R. Técnico
- INESC-ID
- Rádio Zero
- FenixEdu
- ISTSat-1
