= NOVA School of Science and Technology =

Faculty in Monte de Caparica, Portugal

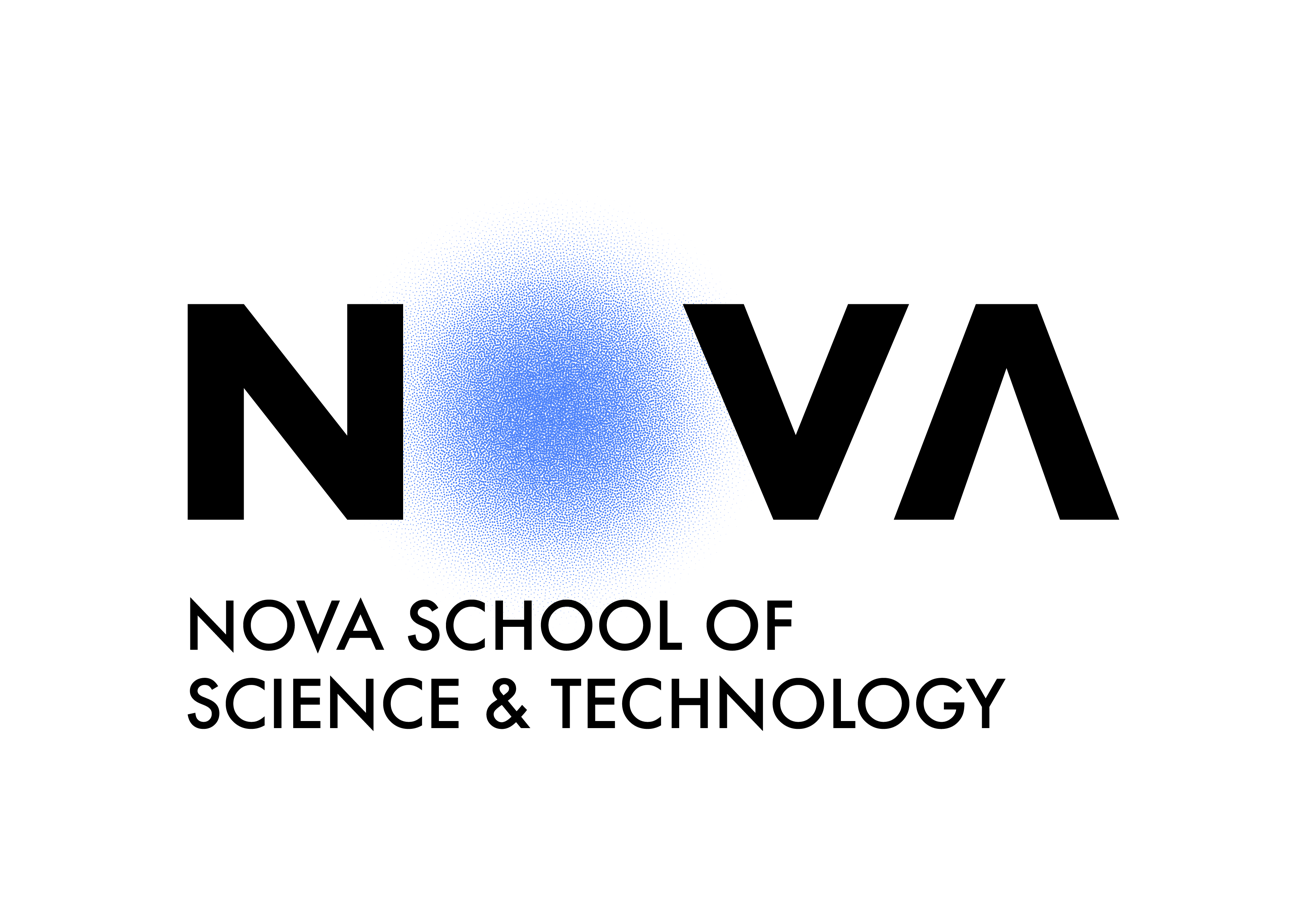
- Former names: Faculdade de Ciências e Tecnologia da Universidade NOVA de Lisboa
- Motto: Another Dimension
- Type: Public
- Established: 1977
- Parent institution: NOVA University Lisbon
- Dean: José Júlio Alferes
- Students: c. 8500
- Location: Monte de Caparica, Portugal; 38.661036°N 9.205928°W
- Campus: Suburban, 15 ha
- Website: https://www.fct.unl.pt/en

The NOVA School of Science and Technology (NOVA FCT) is a Portuguese faculty of the NOVA University Lisbon located at the Caparica Campus, near Lisbon.

The school awards degrees in engineering, natural sciences, and computer science.

== Organization ==
The faculty is divided into departments, each one responsible for teaching the classes relative to its specific area.

The majority of classes are meant for the degrees supplied by the department, but there are a few classes that are common to all degrees (i.e. math classes), which are taught to all students.

== Notable alumni and staff ==
People who have been awarded a degree by the NOVA School of Science and Technology or otherwise have attended or lectured in this institution, include:

- Elvira Fortunato, professor, physicist, engineer, and minister
- António Câmara, professor and entrepreneur
- Carmona Rodrigues, professor, engineer, and politician
- Miguel Telles Antunes, paleontologist
- Octávio Mateus, paleontologist and biologist
