= Technical University of Lisbon =

Portuguese public university

Coordinates: 38°45′09″N 9°09′32″W

- Universidade Técnica de Lisboa
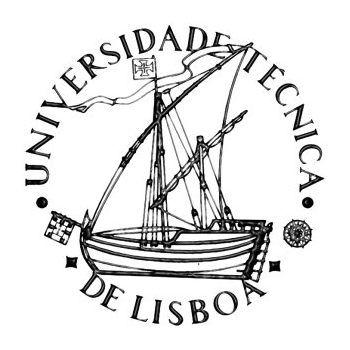
- Type: Public University
- Established: 1930
- Students: 21,427 (2008)
- Location: Lisbon, Portugal
- Website: www.utl.pt

The Technical University of Lisbon (UTL; Portuguese: Universidade Técnica de Lisboa, pronounced [univɨɾsiˈðaðɨ ˈtɛknikɐ ðɨ liʒˈβoɐ]) was a Portuguese public university. It was created in 1930 in Lisbon, as a confederation of preexisting schools, and comprised the faculties and institutes of veterinary medicine; agricultural sciences; economics and business administration; engineering, social and political sciences; architecture; and human kinetics.

On July 25, 2013, it merged with the older University of Lisbon (1911–2013) and was incorporated in the new University of Lisbon.

== Faculties ==
- Veterinary Medicine: FMV - Faculdade de Medicina Veterinária
- Agricultural Sciences: ISA - Instituto Superior de Agronomia
- Economics and Business Management: ISEG - Instituto Superior de Economia e Gestão
- Engineering, Science and Technology: IST - Instituto Superior Técnico
- Social and Political Sciences: ISCSP - Instituto Superior de Ciências Sociais e Políticas
- Human Kinetics: FMH - Faculdade de Motricidade Humana
- Architecture: FA - Faculdade de Arquitectura

The faculties offer all levels of academic degrees in a wide range of fields, ranging from veterinary medicine to agricultural sciences to engineering to political science to sports management.

== Notable alumni ==
People who have been awarded a degree by the Technical University of Lisbon or otherwise have attended this university, include:

- Dom Duarte Pio de Bragança, 24th Duke of Braganza, claimant to the throne of Portugal, agronomist.
- Alberto Romão Dias, Researcher, university professor.
- António Borges (economist), Vice President of Goldman Sachs International
- Amílcar Cabral, Bissau-Guinean independence fighter, guerrilla, agronomist.
- António Câmara, Entrepreneur, university professor, civil engineer.
- Bento de Jesus Caraça, Antifascist resistance, mathematician and economist.
- Carlos Carvalhas, Communist leader, politician, economist.
- Aníbal Cavaco Silva, former President of Republic and Prime Minister, university professor, economist.
- Maria Amélia Chaves, first female civil engineer to graduate from the Instituto Superior Técnico at UTL, and the first Portuguese female engineer to work in the field.
- Vítor Constâncio, former governor Banco de Portugal, politician, economist.
- Nuno Crato, university professor, researcher, writer, mathematician and economist.
- Mariano Gago, minister, politician, university professor, scientist, electrical engineer.
- Carla Gomes, computer scientist, computational sustainability researcher, university professor.
- António Guterres, former Prime Minister, politician, electrical engineer.
- Susana Feitor, racewalker.
- Bagão Félix, Minister, politician, economist.
- Jesualdo Ferreira, football manager, physical educator.
- Manuela Ferreira Leite Former leader PSD, minister, politician, economist.
- Francisco Louçã, Left Bloc leader, politician, university professor, economist.
- José Mourinho, football manager, physical educator.
- Arlindo Oliveira, Scientist, electrical engineer.
- Manuel Pinho, politician and economist
- Jaime Nogueira Pinto, writer and university professor.
- Maria de Lurdes Pintasilgo, Prime Minister, politician, chemical engineer.
- Carlos Queiroz, football manager, physical educator.
- Eduardo Ferro Rodrigues, Socialist leader, politician, economist.
- Ricardo Espírito Santo, banker and art collector.
- Tim, musician, vocalist of Xutos & Pontapés, agronomist.
- Fernando Ulrich, Banker, banking administrator (did not graduate).
- Álvaro Siza Vieira, Architect, university professor, Pritzker Prize winner 1992.
- Fernando Vasco Costa, civil engineer.
- Nelo Vingada, football manager, physical educator.

== See also ==
- List of higher education institutions in Portugal
- Higher education in Portugal
