= Chief of the Naval Staff (Portugal) =

- Chefe do Estado-Maior da Armada
- Flag of the Chief of the Naval Staff
- Incumbent; Admiral Jorge Nobre de Sousa since 27 December 2024
- Portuguese Navy
- Abbreviation: CEMA
- Reports to: Chief of the General Staff
- Appointer: Minister of National Defence
- Formation: 22 November 1955
- First holder: José Guerreiro de Brito
- Deputy: Deputy Chief of Staff
- Website: Official website

The chief of staff of the Portuguese Navy (Portuguese: Chefe do Estado-Maior da Armada, acronym: C.E.M.A.) is the head of the Portuguese Navy and of the Maritime Authority System. The CEMA depends on the minister of national defense in terms of resources, and on the Army chief of staff for preparation and deployment. The current chief is Admiral Jorge Nobre de Sousa, since 27 December 2024.

== List of chiefs ==
The following is a list of navy chiefs:

=== Second Portuguese Republic (1960–1974) ===
No.	Name (Birth–Death)	Term of office			Minister	Commander-in-Chief	Ref.
No.	Name (Birth–Death)	Took office	Left office	Time in office	Minister	Commander-in-Chief	Ref.
1	Admiral José Guerreiro de Brito	22 November 1955	28 October 1960	4 years, 341 days	Fernando Santos Costa; Júlio Botelho Moniz	Francisco Craveiro Lopes; Américo Tomás	
2	Admiral Joaquim Sousa Uva	24 November 1960	8 January 1963	2 years, 45 days	Júlio Botelho Moniz; António de Oliveira Salazar; Manuel Gomes de Araújo	Américo Tomás	
3	Admiral Armando Roboredo e Silva	9 January 1963	10 January 1970	7 years, 1 day	Manuel Gomes de Araújo; Horácio de Sá Viana Rebelo	Américo Tomás	
4	Admiral Fernando Ornelas e Vasconcelos	11 January 1970	13 June 1973	3 years, 153 days	Horácio de Sá Viana Rebelo	Américo Tomás	
5	Admiral Eugénio Ferreira de Almeida	14 June 1973	25 April 1974	315 days	Horácio de Sá Viana Rebelo; Joaquim da Silva Cunha	Américo Tomás	

=== Post Carnation Revolution period (1974–present) ===
No.	Name (Birth–Death)	Term of office			Minister	Commander-in-Chief	Ref.
No.	Name (Birth–Death)	Took office	Left office	Time in office	Minister	Commander-in-Chief	Ref.
6	Admiral José Pinheiro de Azevedo	26 April 1974	28 November 1975	1 year, 216 days	Mário Firmino Miguel; Vítor Alves; Silvano Ribeiro	António de Spínola; Francisco da Costa Gomes	
7	Admiral Augusto Souto Silva Cruz	29 November 1975	8 October 1978	2 years, 313 days	,Silvano Ribeiro; José Baptista Pinheiro de Azevedo; Mário Firmino Miguel	Francisco da Costa Gomes; António Ramalho Eanes	
8	Admiral António Sousa Leitão	9 October 1978	21 November 1987	9 years, 42 days	Mário Firmino Miguel; José Loureiro dos Santos; Adelino Amaro da Costa; Luís de Azevedo Coutinho; Diogo Freitas do Amaral; Carlos Mota Pinto; Rui Machete; Leonardo Ribeiro de Almeida; Eurico de Melo	António Ramalho Eanes; Mário Soares	
9	Admiral António Manuel Andrade e Silva	18 January 1988	3 March 1991	3 years, 44 days	Eurico de Melo; Fernando Nogueira	Mário Soares	
10	Admiral António Carlos Fuzeta da Ponte	4 March 1991	21 February 1994	2 years, 354 days	Fernando Nogueira	Mário Soares	
11	Admiral João Ribeiro Pacheco	28 March 1994	1 April 1997	3 years, 4 days	Fernando Nogueira; António Figueiredo Lopes; António Vitorino	Mário Soares; Jorge Sampaio	
12	Admiral Nuno Gonçalo Vieira Matias	2 April 1997	2 April 2002	5 years, 0 days	António Vitorino; José Veiga Simão; Jaime Gama; Júlio Castro Caldas; Rui Pena	Jorge Sampaio	
13	Admiral José Manuel Garcia Mendes Cabeçadas	7 May 2002	4 November 2002	181 days	Paulo Portas	Jorge Sampaio	
14	Admiral Francisco Torres Vidal	25 November 2002	24 November 2005	2 years, 364 days	Paulo Portas; Luís Amado	Jorge Sampaio	
15	Admiral Fernando Melo Gomes	28 November 2005	28 November 2010	5 years, 0 days	Luís Amado; Nuno Severiano Teixeira; Augusto Santos Silva	Jorge Sampaio; Aníbal Cavaco Silva	
16	Admiral José Carlos Saldanha Lopes	30 November 2010	29 November 2013	2 years, 364 days	Augusto Santos Silva; José Pedro Aguiar-Branco	Aníbal Cavaco Silva	
17	Admiral Luís Macieira Fragoso	9 December 2013	9 December 2016	3 years, 0 days	José Pedro Aguiar-Branco; José Alberto Azeredo Lopes	Aníbal Cavaco Silva; Marcelo Rebelo de Sousa	
18	Admiral; António da Silva Ribeiro	10 December 2016	28 February 2018	1 year, 80 days	José Alberto Azeredo Lopes	Marcelo Rebelo de Sousa	
19	Admiral; António Maria Mendes Calado	1 March 2018	27 December 2021	3 years, 301 days	José Alberto Azeredo Lopes; João Gomes Cravinho	Marcelo Rebelo de Sousa	
20	Admiral; Henrique Gouveia e Melo	27 December 2021	27 December 2024	3 years, 0 days	João Gomes Cravinho; Helena Carreiras; Nuno Melo	Marcelo Rebelo de Sousa	
21	Admiral; Jorge Nobre de Sousa	27 December 2024	Incumbent	1 year, 254 days	Nuno Melo	Marcelo Rebelo de Sousa; António José Seguro	
