= Superior Council of National Defence =

The Superior Council of National Defence (Portuguese: Conselho Superior de Defesa Nacional, CSDN) is a body of the Portuguese Government specifically for consulting the President of Portugal on matters of national defence and the functioning and discipline of the Portuguese Armed Forces.

== CSDN Composition ==
The CSDN is composed of a group of political and military leaders, among whom include Prime Minister, Deputy Prime Minister and Ministers of State, Minister of National Defence, Minister of Foreign Affairs, Minister of Internal Administration, Minister of Finance, Ministers responsible for the areas of industry, energy, transport, and communications, Chief of the General Staff of the Armed Forces, Representatives of the Republic for the Autonomous Regions, Presidents of the governments of the Autonomous Regions of the Azores and Madeira, President of the National Defense Committee of the Assembly of the Republic, Chiefs of Staff of the Navy, Army, and Air Force, and two Members of the Assembly of the Republic.

The President of the Republic may, on his own initiative or at the request of the Prime Minister, invite other persons to participate, without the right to vote, in meetings of the Superior Council of National Defence. The Superior Council of National Defence meets ordinarily every three months and extraordinarily whenever convened by the President of the Republic, either on his own initiative or at the request of the Prime Minister.

== Current composition ==
Position	Member	Affiliation
President of the Republic and chair of the Council	António José Seguro	PS
Prime Minister	Luís Montenegro	PSD
Deputy Prime Minister	Vacant	
Minister of State; Minister of Foreign Affairs	Minister of State and Foreign Affairs; Paulo Rangel	PSD
Minister of State; Minister of Finance	Minister of State and Finance; Joaquim Miranda Sarmento	PSD
Minister of National Defence	Minister of National Defence; Nuno Melo	CDS–PP
Minister of Internal Administration	Minister of Internal Administration; Luís Neves	Ind.
Minister responsible for industry	Minister of Economy and Territorial Cohesion; Manuel Castro Almeida	PSD
Minister responsible for energy	Minister of the Environment and Energy; Graça Carvalho	PSD
Minister responsible for transportation Minister responsible for communications	Minister of Infrastructure and Housing; Miguel Pinto Luz	PSD
Chief of the General Staff of the Armed Forces	General; João Cartaxo Alves	Ind.
Representative of the Republic for Madeira	Pedro Barreto Ferreira	Ind.
Representative of the Republic for the Azores	Susana Goulart Costa	Ind.
President of the Regional Government of Madeira	Miguel Albuquerque	PSD
President of the Regional Government of the Azores	José Manuel Bolieiro	PSD
Chair of the National Defence Committee of the Assembly of the Republic	Pedro Pessanha	CH
Chief of the Naval Staff	Admiral; Jorge Nobre de Sousa	Ind.
Chief of Staff of the Army	General; Eduardo Mendes Ferrão	Ind.
Chief of Staff of the Air Force	General; Sérgio Costa Pereira	Ind.
Elected members of the Assembly of the Republic	Bruno Vitorino	PSD
Elected members of the Assembly of the Republic	Francisco César	PS
