= José Lopes =

José Lopes may refer to:

- José Alberto Azeredo Lopes (born 1961), Portuguese politician
- José dos Santos Lopes (1911–1996), Brazilian footballer
- José Leite Lopes (1918–2006), Brazilian theoretical physicist
- José Lopes da Silva (disambiguation), multiple people
