= Minister of Foreign Affairs (Portugal) =

Minister of State and Foreign Affairs
- Ministro de Estado e dos Negócios Estrangeiros
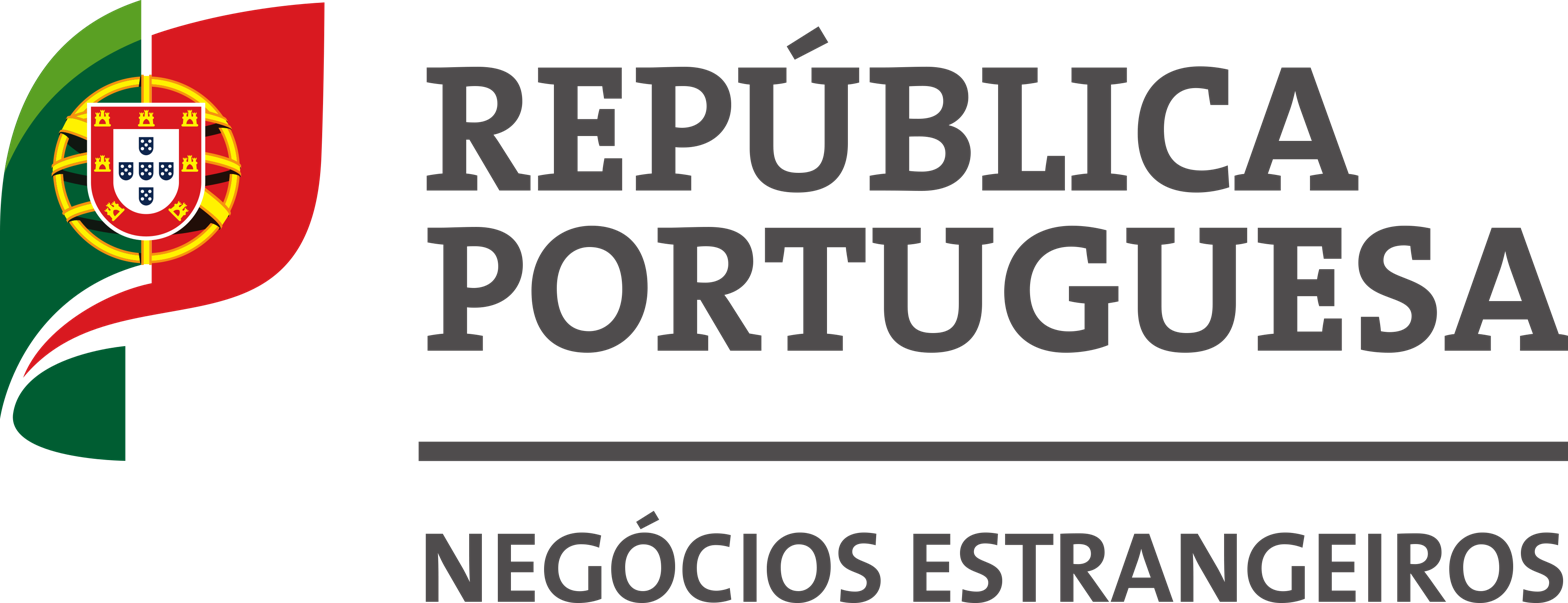
- Ministry logo

- Portuguese ministerial standard

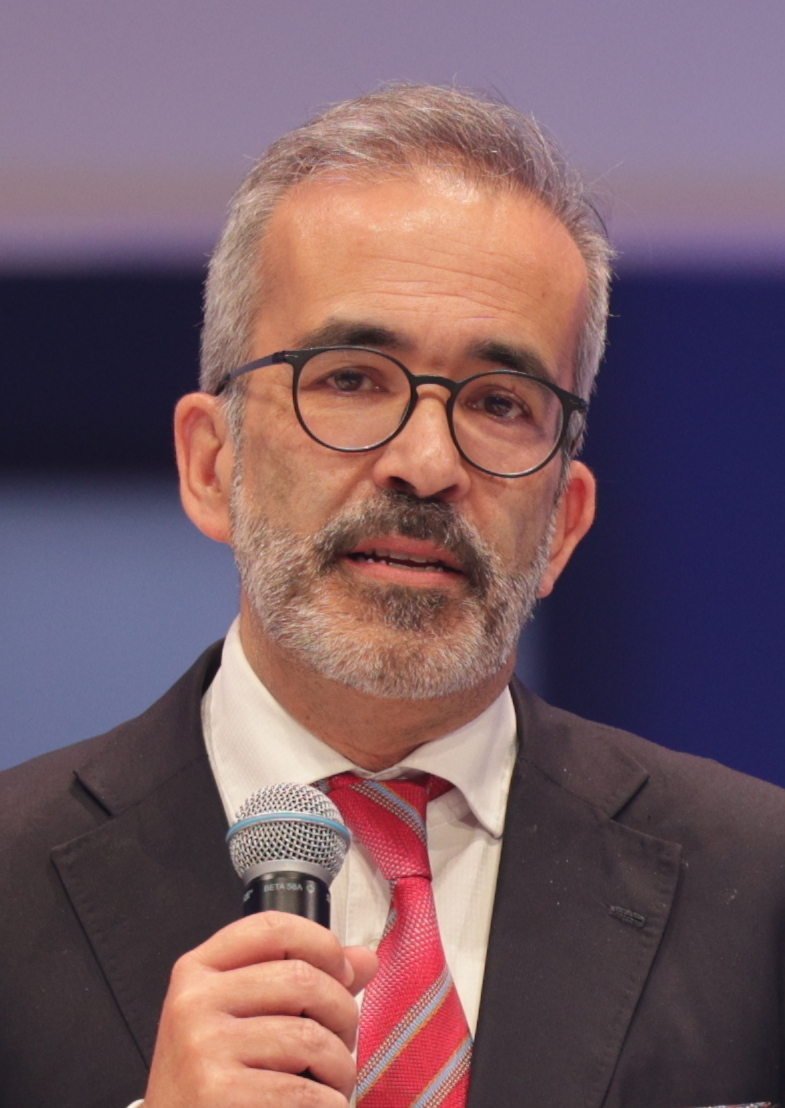
- Incumbent; Paulo Rangel since 2 April 2024
- Ministry of Foreign Affairs
- Style: Minister (informal); His Excellency (formal, diplomatic)
- Abbreviation: MNE
- Member of: Cabinet; Council of Ministers; Council of the EU
- Reports to: Prime Minister
- Seat: Necessidades Palace, Estrela, Lisbon
- Appointer: President of the Republic on advice of the Prime Minister
- Term length: No fixed term
- Precursor: Secretariat of State for Foreign Affairs and War
- Formation: 12 June 1822; 204 years ago
- First holder: Dom José Luís de Sousa Botelho Mourão e Vasconcelos
- Website: portaldiplomatico.mne.gov.pt

The Minister of State and Foreign Affairs of Portugal is in charge of conducting the foreign policy established by the Portuguese government, representing the country in many international meetings. The current minister is Paulo Rangel.

The following is a list of office holders since 1936:

== Holders ==
- 1936–1947: António de Oliveira Salazar
- 1947–1950: José Caeiro da Mata
- 1950–1956: Paulo Cunha (1st time)
- 1956–1957: Marcelo Caetano (1st time)
- 1957: Paulo Cunha (2nd time)
- 1957: Marcelo Caetano (2nd time)
- 1957–1958: Paulo Cunha (3rd time)
- 1958–1961: Marcello Mathias
- 1961–1969: Alberto Franco Nogueira
- 1969–1970: Marcelo Caetano (3rd time)
- 1970–1974: Rui Patrício

=== Since 1974 ===
Colour key
(for political parties)
Socialist Party (PS)
Social Democratic Party (PSD)
Democratic and Social Center (CDS)
Independent (Ind.)

#	Portrait	Name	Took office	Left office	Party	Prime Minister
1		Mário Soares (1924–2017)	15 May 1974	26 May 1975	PS	Adelino da Palma Carlos
1		Mário Soares (1924–2017)	15 May 1974	26 May 1975	PS	Vasco Gonçalves
2		Ernesto Melo Antunes (1933–1999)	26 May 1975	8 August 1975	Ind.	Vasco Gonçalves
3		Mário Ruivo (1927–2017)	8 August 1975	19 September 1975	Ind.	Vasco Gonçalves
4		Ernesto Melo Antunes (1933–1999)	19 September 1975	23 July 1976	Ind.	José Pinheiro de Azevedo
5		José Medeiros Ferreira (1942–2014)	23 July 1976	12 October 1977	PS	Mário Soares
6		Mário Soares (1924–2017)	12 October 1977	30 January 1978	PS	Mário Soares
7		Victor Sá Machado (1933–2002)	30 January 1978	29 August 1978	CDS	Mário Soares
8		Carlos Corrêa Gago (1934–2015)	29 August 1978	22 November 1978	Ind.	Alfredo Nobre da Costa
9		João de Freitas Cruz (1925–1984)	22 November 1978	3 January 1980	Ind.	Carlos Mota Pinto
9		João de Freitas Cruz (1925–1984)	22 November 1978	3 January 1980	Ind.	Maria de Lourdes Pintasilgo
10		Diogo Freitas do Amaral (1941–2019)	3 January 1980	9 January 1981	CDS	Francisco Sá Carneiro
10		Diogo Freitas do Amaral (1941–2019)	3 January 1980	9 January 1981	CDS	Diogo Freitas do Amaral
11		André Gonçalves Pereira (1936–2019)	9 January 1981	9 June 1982	Ind.	Francisco Pinto Balsemão
12		Vasco Futscher Pereira (1922–1984)	9 June 1982	9 June 1983	Ind.	Francisco Pinto Balsemão
13		Jaime Gama (b. 1947)	9 June 1983	6 November 1985	PS	Mário Soares
14		Pedro Pires de Miranda (1928–2015)	6 November 1985	17 August 1987	Ind.	Aníbal Cavaco Silva
15		João de Deus Pinheiro (b. 1945)	17 August 1987	12 November 1992	PSD	Aníbal Cavaco Silva
16		José Manuel Durão Barroso (b. 1956)	12 November 1992	28 October 1995	PSD	Aníbal Cavaco Silva
17		Jaime Gama (b. 1947)	28 October 1995	6 April 2002	PS	António Guterres
18		António Martins da Cruz (b. 1946)	6 April 2002	9 October 2003	PSD	José Manuel Durão Barroso
19		Teresa Patrício de Gouveia (b. 1946)	9 October 2003	17 July 2004	PSD	José Manuel Durão Barroso
20		António Monteiro (b. 1944)	17 July 2004	12 March 2005	Ind.	Pedro Santana Lopes
21		Diogo Freitas do Amaral (1941–2019)	12 March 2005	3 July 2006	Ind.	José Sócrates
22		Luís Amado (b. 1953)	3 July 2006	21 June 2011	PS	José Sócrates
23		Paulo Portas (b. 1962)	21 June 2011	24 July 2013	CDS–PP	Pedro Passos Coelho
24		Rui Machete (b. 1940)	24 July 2013	26 November 2015	PSD	Pedro Passos Coelho
25		Augusto Santos Silva (b. 1956)	26 November 2015	28 March 2022	PS	António Costa
26		António Costa (b. 1961)	28 March 2022	30 March 2022	PS	António Costa
27		João Gomes Cravinho (b. 1964)	30 March 2022	2 April 2024	PS	António Costa
28		Paulo Rangel (b. 1968)	2 April 2024	present	PSD	Luís Montenegro

== Secretaries ==
- Inês Domingos, Secretary of State for European Affairs
- Nuno Sampaio, Secretary of State for Foreign Affairs and Cooperation
- José Cesário, Secretary of State for the Portuguese Communities
