= Tancos arms theft scandal =

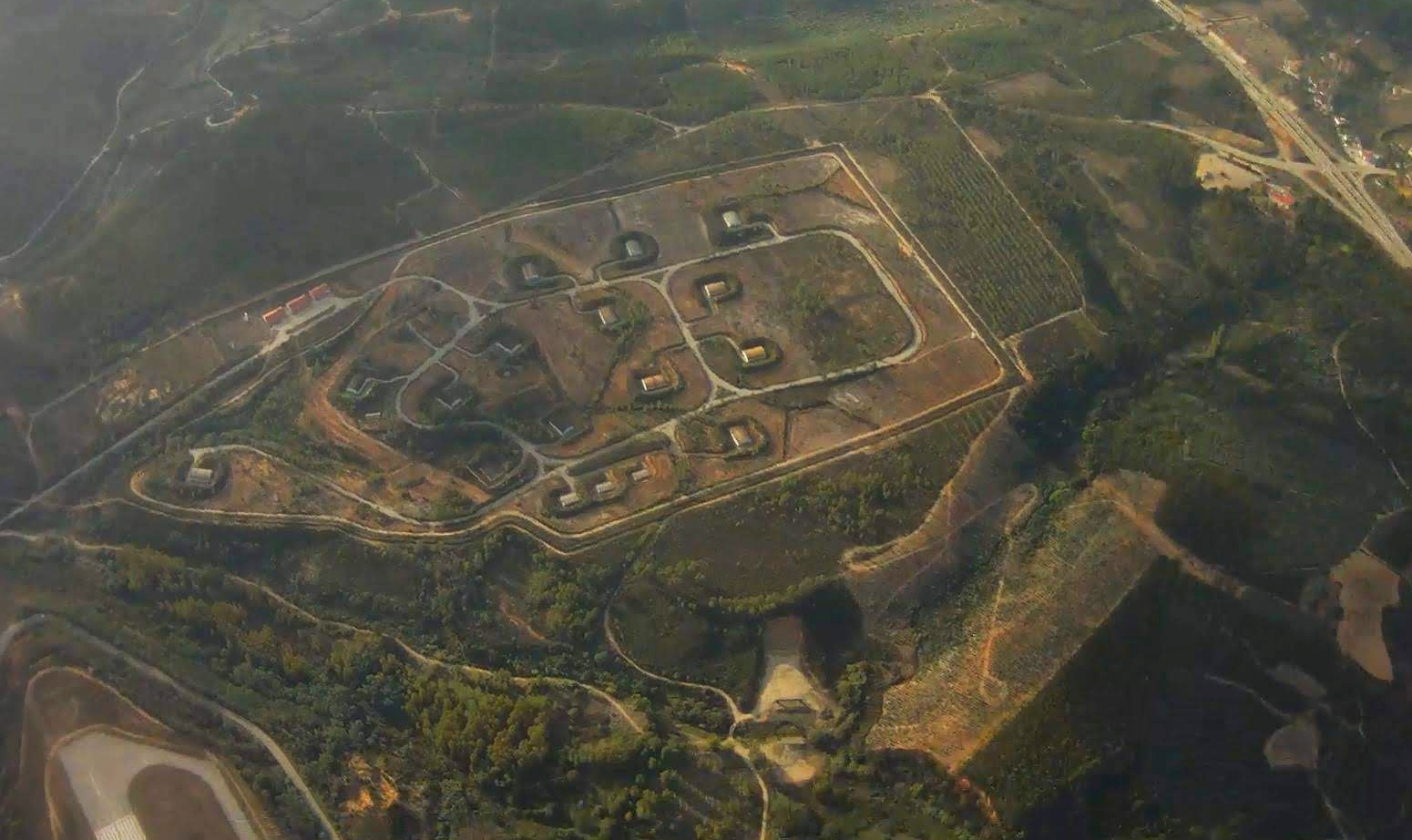
Aerial view of Portuguese Army's weapon storage site in Tancos, Santarém

On 28 June 2017, an arms theft at a military base in Tancos, Portugal was discovered. The stolen weapons reportedly included 1,450 9 mm caliber cartridges, 150 hand grenades, 44 anti-tank grenades, 18 tear gas grenades, 264 units of plastic explosives, and 102 explosive charges. Following an anonymous tip-off, some of the weapons were found in Chamusca on 18 October 2017.

An investigation into the recovery of the weapons led to the September 2018 arrests of six military officials from the National Republican Guard and the Military Judicial Police (PJM), including the head of the PJM, Coronel Luís Augusto Vieira. Amid accusations of a military cover-up of the arms theft, Minister of National Defence José Alberto Azeredo Lopes resigned on 12 October 2018. Azeredo Lopes has denied any involvement in the alleged cover-up.
