= Teresa Patrício de Gouveia =

Portuguese retired politician and public servant

Teresa Patrício de Gouveia GOIH GCIH GCC GCOH KMM
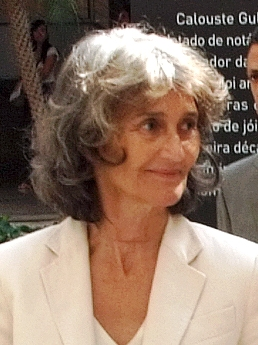

Minister of Foreign Affairs and Portuguese Communities
- In office 9 October 2003 – 17 July 2004
- President: Jorge Sampaio
- Prime Minister: Durão Barroso
- Preceded by: António Martins da Cruz
- Succeeded by: António Monteiro

Minister of Environment and Natural Resources
- In office 11 June 1993 – 28 October 1995
- President: Mário Soares
- Prime Minister: Aníbal Cavaco Silva
- Preceded by: Carlos Borrego
- Succeeded by: Elisa Ferreira

Personal details
- Born: Maria Teresa Pinto Basto Patrício de Gouveia; 18 July 1946 (age 80) Lisbon, Portugal
- Party: Social Democratic Party
- Spouse: Alexandre O'Neill (1971–1981)
- Children: One son
- Education: University of Lisbon
- Occupation: Politician
- Profession: Public servant

Maria Teresa Pinto Basto Patrício de Gouveia, GOIH GCIH GCC GCOH KMM (born 18 July 1946), commonly known as Teresa Patrício de Gouveia, is a Portuguese cultural manager, public servant and retired politician.

== Background ==
Gouveia is a daughter of Afonso Patrício de Gouveia (Guarda, Sé, 18 July 1915 – present) and wife Maria Madalena d'Orey Ferreira Pinto Basto (Lisbon, 19 August 1925 – present), from a Family of the high Bourgeoisie and some Nobility and of more or less distant English, German, French and Italian descent. One of her brothers, António, died in Camarate air crash along with the then Prime Minister, Francisco Sá Carneiro, and the Minister of Defense, Adelino Amaro da Costa.

== Career ==
Gouveia is a licentiate in history from the Faculty of Letters of the University of Lisbon.

Gouveia became a member of the European Council, Secretary of State for Culture and Minister for the Environment and Natural Resources in the XIth Constitutional Government, Deputy to the Assembly of the Republic, Minister of Foreign Affairs (2003–2004) and President of the Serralves Foundation.

== Other activities ==
- European Council on Foreign Relations (ECFR), Member of the Board of Trustees (since 2020)

== Political positions ==
In February 2020, Gouveia joined around fifty former European prime ministers and foreign ministers in signing an open letter published by British newspaper The Guardian to condemn U.S. President Donald Trump's Middle East peace plan, saying it would create an apartheid-like situation in occupied Palestinian territory.

== Decorations ==
Gouveia was decorated with the Grand Cross of the Order of Prince Henry.

== Marriage and child ==
Gouveia married in Lisbon on 4 August 1971 and divorced on 20 February 1981 Writer and Poet Alexandre O'Neill. The couple had a son and 2 grandchildren:

- Afonso de Gouveia O'Neill (28 May 1976 –)
  - Afonso Gordon O'Neill (grandson)
  - Alexander O'Neill (grandson)
