= Deputy Prime Minister of Portugal =

Deputy Prime Minister of the Portuguese Republic
- Vice-Primeiro-Ministro da República Portuguesa
- Government logo
- Incumbent; Vacant office since 26 November 2015
- Government of Portugal; Council of Ministers of Portugal
- Type: Head of government
- Member of: Council of Ministers; Superior Council of National Defence
- Reports to: Parliament; President
- Residence: Laranjeiras Palace
- Seat: Lisbon, Portugal
- Appointer: President
- Term length: Four years no term limits
- Constituting instrument: Constitution of Portugal (1976)
- Inaugural holder: Abílio Passos e Sousa
- Formation: 11 August 1927 (99 years ago)
- Website: portugal.gov.pt

The deputy prime minister of Portugal is the second in command to the prime minister, assuming the responsibilities of the premiership when the prime minister is absent or incapable of exercising power.

The office of deputy prime minister is currently vacant, having been last held by Paulo Portas from 2013 until 2015. As deputy head of the executive branch, the Deputy Prime Minister replaces the Prime Minister in the event of the latter's incapacity or death. The Constitution of Portugal provides for the existence of one or more deputy prime ministers. The deputy prime minister can accumulate the function of head of government with the portfolios of one or more ministries.

During Paulo Portas' term as deputy prime minister, the official residence was in Laranjeiras Palace, in Lisbon.

== History ==
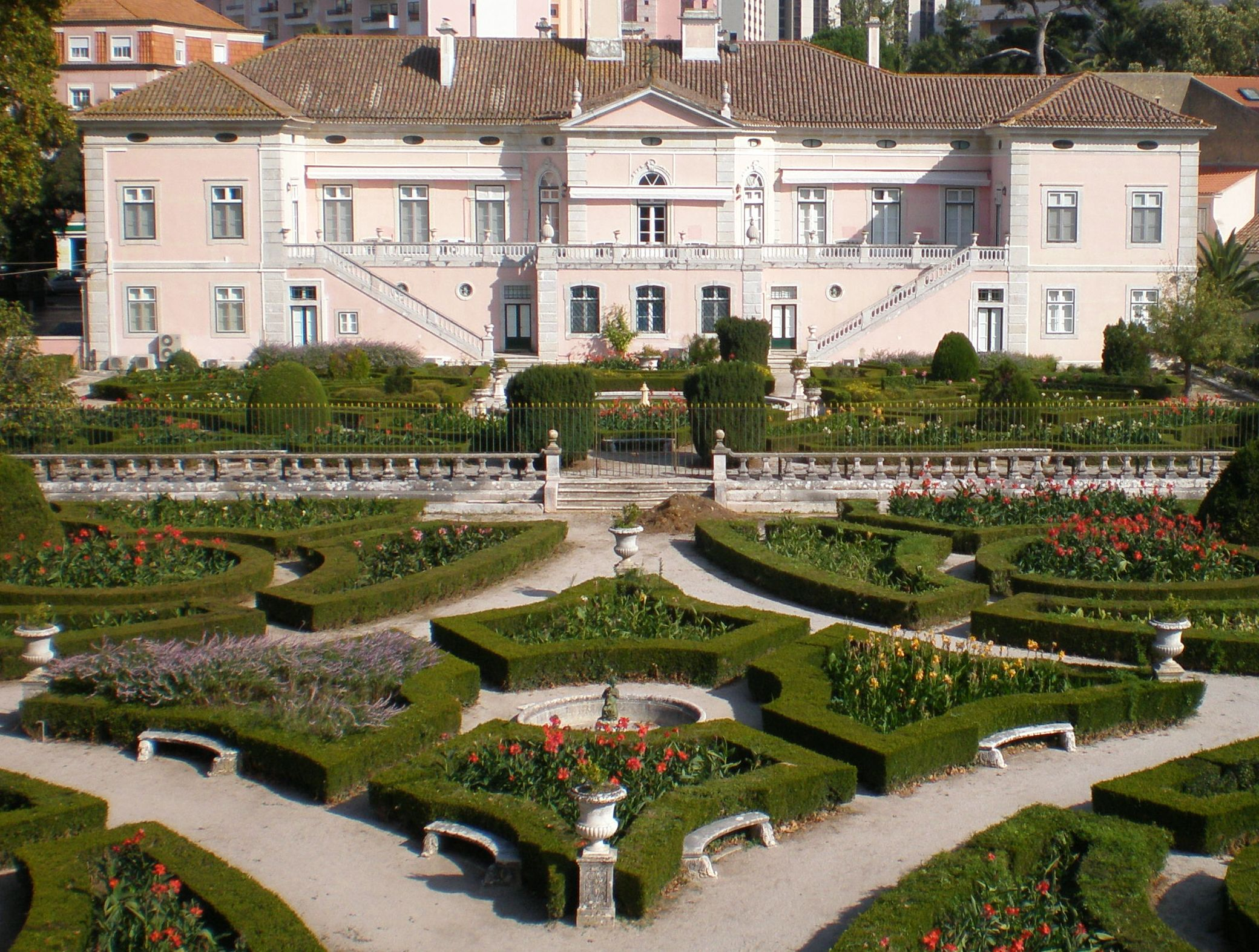
Laranjeiras Palace, the official residence of the Deputy Prime Minister

The first Deputy Prime Minister of Portugal was Abílio Passos e Sousa, for less than a month in August 1927, during the government of Óscar Carmona. After that, the office was left vacant until, during the V Provisional Government, led by Vasco Gonçalves, two Deputy Prime Ministers were appointed, José Teixeira Ribeiro and António Arnão Metello.

After that, the office of Deputy Prime Minister was usually attributed to the leader of the second largest party in case of a coalition government. That was the case with Diogo Freitas do Amaral within the Democratic Alliance from 1980 until 1983, Carlos Mota Pinto and Rui Machete during the Central Bloc from 1983 until 1985, and Paulo Portas within the PSD/CDS coalition from 2013 until 2015.

=== Designations ===
- Deputy President of the Ministry: 11 August 1927 – 26 August 1927
- Deputy Prime Minister: 8 August 1975 – 19 September 1975
- Deputy Prime Minister for Economic Affairs and European Integration: 22 November 1978 – 1 August 1979
- Deputy Prime Minister: 3 January 1980 – present

== List of deputy prime ministers ==
#	Portrait	Name	Took office	Left office	Party	Prime Minister
1		Abílio Passos e Sousa (1881–1966)	11 August 1927	26 August 1927	Ind.	Óscar Carmona
–	Vacant office		26 August 1927	8 August 1975		Óscar Carmona
–	Vacant office		26 August 1927	8 August 1975		José Vicente de Freitas
–	Vacant office		26 August 1927	8 August 1975		Artur Ivens Ferraz
–	Vacant office		26 August 1927	8 August 1975		Domingos Oliveira
–	Vacant office		26 August 1927	8 August 1975		António de Oliveira Salazar
–	Vacant office		26 August 1927	8 August 1975		Marcelo Caetano
–	Vacant office		26 August 1927	8 August 1975		Adelino da Palma Carlos
–	Vacant office		26 August 1927	8 August 1975		Vasco Gonçalves
2		José Teixeira Ribeiro (1908–1997)	8 August 1975	19 September 1975	Ind.	Vasco Gonçalves
2		António Arnão Metello (1938–2008)	8 August 1975	19 September 1975	Ind.	Vasco Gonçalves
–	Vacant office As the first minister in the cabinet: Henrique de Barros (1976–1978); António de Almeida Santos (1978); Carlos Costa Freitas (1978)		19 September 1975	22 November 1978		José Pinheiro de Azevedo
–	Vacant office As the first minister in the cabinet: Henrique de Barros (1976–1978); António de Almeida Santos (1978); Carlos Costa Freitas (1978)		19 September 1975	22 November 1978		Mário Soares
–	Vacant office As the first minister in the cabinet: Henrique de Barros (1976–1978); António de Almeida Santos (1978); Carlos Costa Freitas (1978)		19 September 1975	22 November 1978		Alfredo Nobre da Costa
3		Manuel Jacinto Nunes (1926–2014)	22 November 1978	1 August 1979	Ind.	Carlos Mota Pinto
–	Vacant office As the first minister in the cabinet: Manuel da Costa Braz (1979–1980)		1 August 1979	3 January 1980		Maria de Lourdes Pintasilgo
4		Diogo Freitas do Amaral (1942–2019)	3 January 1980	9 January 1981	CDS	Francisco Sá Carneiro
4		Diogo Freitas do Amaral (1942–2019)	3 January 1980	9 January 1981	CDS	Diogo Freitas do Amaral
–	Vacant office As the first minister in the cabinet: Basílio Horta (1981)		9 January 1981	4 September 1981		Francisco Pinto Balsemão
4		Diogo Freitas do Amaral (1942–2019)	4 September 1981	25 February 1983	CDS	Francisco Pinto Balsemão
5		Ricardo Bayão Horta (b. 1936)	25 February 1983	9 June 1983	CDS	Francisco Pinto Balsemão
6		Carlos Mota Pinto (1936–1985)	9 June 1983	15 February 1985	PSD	Mário Soares
7		Rui Machete (b. 1940)	15 February 1985	6 November 1985	PSD	Mário Soares
–	Vacant office As the first minister in the cabinet: Eurico de Melo (1985–1987)		6 November 1985	17 August 1987		Aníbal Cavaco Silva
8		Eurico de Melo (1925–2012)	17 August 1987	5 January 1990	PSD	Aníbal Cavaco Silva
–	Vacant office As the first minister in the cabinet: Fernando Nogueira (1990–1995); Luís Marques Mendes (1995); António Vitorino (1995–1997); José Sócrates (1997–1999); Jaime Gama (1999–2002); Manuela Ferreira Leite (2002–2004); Álvaro Barreto (2004–2005); António Costa (2005–2007); Luís Amado (2007–2011); Vítor Gaspar (2011–2013); Maria Luís Albuquerque (2013)		5 January 1990	24 July 2013		Aníbal Cavaco Silva
–	Vacant office As the first minister in the cabinet: Fernando Nogueira (1990–1995); Luís Marques Mendes (1995); António Vitorino (1995–1997); José Sócrates (1997–1999); Jaime Gama (1999–2002); Manuela Ferreira Leite (2002–2004); Álvaro Barreto (2004–2005); António Costa (2005–2007); Luís Amado (2007–2011); Vítor Gaspar (2011–2013); Maria Luís Albuquerque (2013)		5 January 1990	24 July 2013		António Guterres
–	Vacant office As the first minister in the cabinet: Fernando Nogueira (1990–1995); Luís Marques Mendes (1995); António Vitorino (1995–1997); José Sócrates (1997–1999); Jaime Gama (1999–2002); Manuela Ferreira Leite (2002–2004); Álvaro Barreto (2004–2005); António Costa (2005–2007); Luís Amado (2007–2011); Vítor Gaspar (2011–2013); Maria Luís Albuquerque (2013)		5 January 1990	24 July 2013		José Manuel Durão Barroso
–	Vacant office As the first minister in the cabinet: Fernando Nogueira (1990–1995); Luís Marques Mendes (1995); António Vitorino (1995–1997); José Sócrates (1997–1999); Jaime Gama (1999–2002); Manuela Ferreira Leite (2002–2004); Álvaro Barreto (2004–2005); António Costa (2005–2007); Luís Amado (2007–2011); Vítor Gaspar (2011–2013); Maria Luís Albuquerque (2013)		5 January 1990	24 July 2013		Pedro Santana Lopes
–	Vacant office As the first minister in the cabinet: Fernando Nogueira (1990–1995); Luís Marques Mendes (1995); António Vitorino (1995–1997); José Sócrates (1997–1999); Jaime Gama (1999–2002); Manuela Ferreira Leite (2002–2004); Álvaro Barreto (2004–2005); António Costa (2005–2007); Luís Amado (2007–2011); Vítor Gaspar (2011–2013); Maria Luís Albuquerque (2013)		5 January 1990	24 July 2013		José Sócrates
–	Vacant office As the first minister in the cabinet: Fernando Nogueira (1990–1995); Luís Marques Mendes (1995); António Vitorino (1995–1997); José Sócrates (1997–1999); Jaime Gama (1999–2002); Manuela Ferreira Leite (2002–2004); Álvaro Barreto (2004–2005); António Costa (2005–2007); Luís Amado (2007–2011); Vítor Gaspar (2011–2013); Maria Luís Albuquerque (2013)		5 January 1990	24 July 2013		Pedro Passos Coelho
9		Paulo Portas (b. 1962)	24 July 2013	26 November 2015	CDS	Pedro Passos Coelho
–	Vacant office As the first minister in the cabinet: Augusto Santos Silva (2015–2019); Pedro Siza Vieira (2019–2022); Mariana Vieira da Silva (2022–2024); Paulo Rangel (2024–...)		26 November 2015	Incumbent		António Costa
–	Vacant office As the first minister in the cabinet: Augusto Santos Silva (2015–2019); Pedro Siza Vieira (2019–2022); Mariana Vieira da Silva (2022–2024); Paulo Rangel (2024–...)		26 November 2015	Incumbent		Luís Montenegro

=== By time in office ===
Rank	Name	Party	Time in office	Duration
1	Diogo Freitas do Amaral	Centrist	1980–1981; 1981–1983	2 years, 180 days
2	Eurico de Melo	Social Democratic	1987–1990	2 years, 141 days
3	Paulo Portas	Centrist	2013–2015	2 years, 125 days
4	Carlos Mota Pinto	Social Democratic	1983–1985	1 year, 251 days
5	Rui Machete	Social Democratic	1985	264 days
6	Manuel Jacinto Nunes	Independent	1979–1980	252 days
7	Ricardo Bayão Horta	Centrist	1983	104 days
8	José Teixeira Ribeiro	Independent	1975	42 days
8	António Arnão Metelo	Independent	1975	42 days
10	Abílio Passos e Sousa	Independent	1927	15 days

== See also ==
- Prime Minister of Portugal
