= Duarte de Freitas do Amaral =

Portuguese politician

Duarte Pinto de Carvalho de Freitas do Amaral, GCIH, ComC KCSG; (13 May 1909 – 16 July 1979) was a Portuguese politician.

== Background ==
He was the fourth of six children of Duarte do Amaral Pinto de Freitas and wife Ana Mendes Ribeiro de Oliveira, and the brother of Gaspar Pinto de Carvalho de Freitas do Amaral.

== Career ==
He was a Licentiate in Civil Engineering from the University of Porto.

A landowner, he became the Lord by purchase of the House of an Aveleira, in Pencelo, Guimarães.

He became a Deputy to the National Assembly of Portugal and a Voter of the Superior Councils of the Industry and the Combustibles, Vice President of the Administration Council of Sacor and President of the Administration Councils of Cidla and Petroquímica.

== Distinctions ==
- Portugal : Grand Cross of the Order of Prince Henry
- Portugal: Commander of the Order of Christ
- Holy See: Knight Commander of the Order of St. Gregory the Great
- Holy See: Knight of the Order of the Holy Sepulchre
- Sovereign Military Order of Malta: Knight
- Brazil : Grand Officer of the Order of Rio Branco
- Brazil : Officer of the Order of the Southern Cross
- Portugal: Honorary Citizen of Póvoa de Varzim

== Marriage and issue ==
He married at the Chapel of the Patriarchate in Lisbon on 12 December 1936 Maria Filomena de Campos Trocado, born in Póvoa de Varzim on 8 July 1913, sister of his sister in law, daughter of Dr. Josué Francisco Trocado and wife Maria Alves de Campos, and had four children:

- Duarte Pinto de Freitas do Amaral (Guimarães, 29 October 1937 - 6 August 1941)
- Pedro Pinto de Freitas do Amaral (14 October 1938 - House of an Eira, 7 October 1941)
- Diogo Pinto de Freitas do Amaral
- João Pinto de Freitas do Amaral
