= Rui Patrício (politician) =

Portuguese jurist and politician (1932–2024)

Minister of Foreign Affairs
- In office 15 January 1970 – 25 April 1974
- Preceded by: Marcelo Caetano
- Succeeded by: National Salvation Junta; Mário Soares

Personal details
- Born: Rui Manuel de Medeiros d'Espinay Patrício; 17 August 1932 Lisbon, Portugal
- Died: 4 February 2024 (aged 91) Rio de Janeiro, Brazil
- Party: UN
- Education: University of Lisbon
- Occupation: Jurist

Rui Manuel de Medeiros d'Espinay Patrício (17 August 1932 – 4 February 2024) was a Portuguese jurist and politician. A member of the National Union, he served as Minister of Foreign Affairs from 1970 to 1974.

Patrício died in Rio de Janeiro on 4 February 2024, at the age of 91.
