= Diogo Freitas do Amaral =

Portuguese politician and law professor (1941–2019)

His Excellency Diogo Freitas do Amaral GCC GCSE GCIH
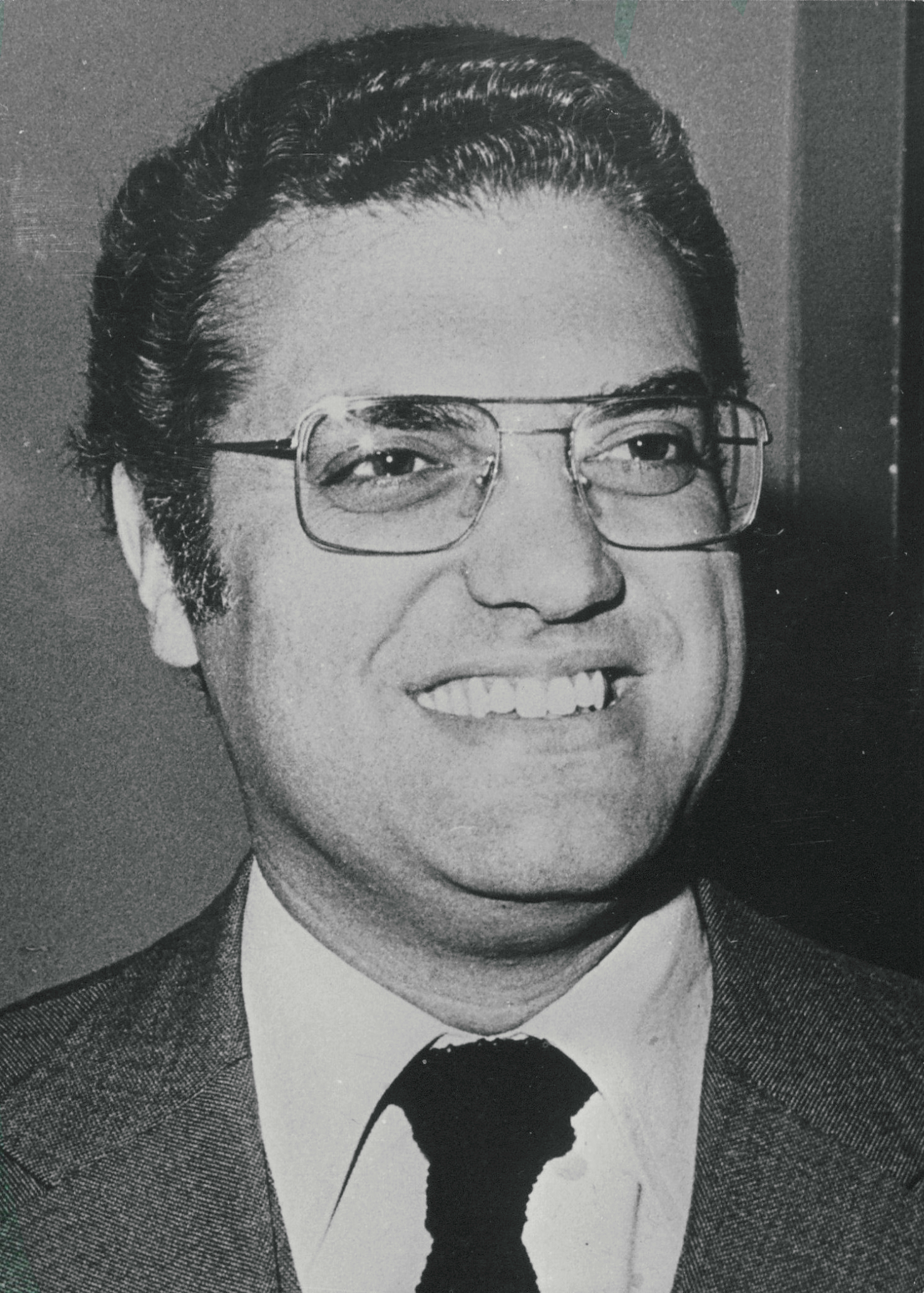
- Freitas do Amaral in 1980

Deputy Prime Minister of Portugal
- In office 4 September 1981 – 9 June 1983
- Prime Minister: Francisco Pinto Balsemão
- Preceded by: Office vacant
- Succeeded by: Carlos Mota Pinto
- In office 3 January 1980 – 9 January 1981
- Prime Minister: Francisco de Sá Carneiro
- Preceded by: Manuel Jacinto Nunes
- Succeeded by: Office vacant

Prime Minister of Portugal
- Acting; 4 December 1980 – 9 January 1981
- President: António Ramalho Eanes
- Preceded by: Francisco de Sá Carneiro
- Succeeded by: Francisco Pinto Balsemão

President of the Democratic Social Centre
- In office 31 January 1988 – 22 March 1992
- Vice President: Basílio Horta; João Morais Leitão; José Luís Nogueira de Brito; Luís Beiroco
- Preceded by: Adriano Moreira
- Succeeded by: Manuel Monteiro
- In office 26 January 1975 – 20 February 1983
- Vice President: Adelino Amaro da Costa; Basílio Horta; Francisco Lucas Pires; Vítor de Sá Machado
- Preceded by: Office established
- Succeeded by: Francisco Lucas Pires

Minister of Foreign Affairs
- In office 12 March 2005 – 3 July 2006
- Prime Minister: José Sócrates
- Preceded by: António Monteiro
- Succeeded by: Luís Amado
- In office 10 January 1980 – 12 January 1981
- Prime Minister: Francisco de Sá Carneiro
- Preceded by: João Cardoso
- Succeeded by: André Gonçalves Pereira

Minister of National Defence
- In office 4 September 1981 – 9 June 1983
- Prime Minister: Francisco Pinto Balsemão
- Preceded by: Luís de Azevedo Coutinho
- Succeeded by: Carlos Mota Pinto

Personal details
- Born: 21 July 1941 Póvoa de Varzim, Portugal
- Died: 3 October 2019 (aged 78) Cascais, Portugal
- Party: Independent (1992–2019)
- Other political affiliations: CDS–PP (1974–1992)
- Spouse: Maria José Salgado Sarmento de Matos (m. 1965)
- Children: 4

Diogo Pinto de Freitas do Amaral (European Portuguese pronunciation: [diˈoɣu ˈfɾɐjtɐʒ ðu ɐmɐˈɾal]; 21 July 1941 – 3 October 2019) was a Portuguese politician and law professor. He was Minister of Foreign Affairs from 10 January 1980 to 12 January 1981 and from 12 March 2005 to 3 July 2006. He also served briefly as Prime Minister in an interim capacity in the early 1980s, after the death of Francisco de Sá Carneiro.

== Background ==
He was born in Póvoa de Varzim, Portugal, the third but first surviving son of Duarte de Freitas do Amaral and wife Maria Filomena de Campos Trocado, and the older brother of João de Freitas do Amaral.

== Career ==
He was a Licentiate and a Doctorate in Law specialised in Administrative Law and Political Science from the Faculty of Law of the University of Lisbon, and a Cathedratic Professor in the Faculty of Law at the New University of Lisbon and also a publicist.

He served as a professor in the Faculty of Law of the Lusófona University of Lisbon, where he taught and governed as the chair of the Economics of Public Law in Law degree, developing other teaching activities in the same college. In 1974, some months after the Carnation Revolution, he was one of the Founders and President of then Democratic and Social Centre (CDS), a Christian democratic party. He led this party till 1985, and again from 1988 to 1991. He served as a Deputy to the Assembly of the Republic (the Portuguese parliament) from 1975 to 1982 or 1983, and again in 1992 and 1993.

He was also a Member of the Portuguese Council of State (1974–1982).

In the parliamentary elections of 1979 and 1980, the Democratic Alliance (of which the CDS was a part) won a majority and formed the government, in which Freitas served as Deputy Prime Minister or Vice-Prime-Minister and Minister of Foreign Affairs in 1980 and Deputy Prime Minister or Vice-Prime-Minister and Minister of Defence between 1981 and 1983. After the death of Francisco Sá Carneiro, Freitas do Amaral was interim Prime Minister for a short period between 1980 and 1981. Between 1981 and 1982 he was also the President of the European People's Party.

He was a candidate in 1985 for the presidency in the 1986 presidential election. Supported by his own People's Party and by the Social Democratic Party, he established a commanding lead in the first round, but lost the second round by some 150,000 votes to Mário Soares, who was endorsed by the two eliminated candidates.

He was President of the United Nations General Assembly (1995–1996).

A European federalist, he left the party he founded, disagreeing mainly with the Eurosceptic line followed by Manuel Monteiro and Paulo Portas.

Always seen as a right-winger, Freitas do Amaral supported the Social Democratic Party in the parliamentary election of 2002. However, disappointed with the government performance, and critical of its support for the U.S. invasion of Iraq, Freitas do Amaral surprised many observers by announcing his support for the Socialist Party in the 2005 election. He was subsequently nominated for Minister of State and Minister of Foreign Affairs of the XVII Constitutional Government, led by the Socialist leader José Sócrates. He resigned after a little over one year in office, citing health reasons and, as revealed to a newspaper, tiredness resulting from the many diplomatic trips taken.

He was also a Juridical Consultant of many companies.

He authored a biography of King Afonso I and a play about Viriatus.

He also published a study of the actuality and reform of the prison system in Portugal.

== Honours ==
- Grand Cross of the Order of Christ (3 August 1983)
- Grand Cross of the Military Order of Saint James of the Sword (9 June 2003)
- Grand Cross of the Order of Prince Henry (9 June 1984)

=== Foreign ===
- Estonia: First Class of the Order of the White Star (29 March 2006)
- France: Commander of National Order of Merit (27 January 2006)
- Germany: Grand Cross of the Order of Merit of the Federal Republic of Germany (22 December 1980)
- Italy: Knight Grand Cross of the Order of Merit of the Italian Republic (3 November 1980)
- Norway: Grand Cross of the Order of St. Olav (3 November 1980)

== Personal life ==
He married in Sintra, Santa Maria, on 31 July 1965 Maria José Salgado Sarmento de Matos, born in Lisbon on 13 October 1943, writer under the pseudonym Maria Roma, daughter of José Sarmento Osório de Vasconcelos de Matos (Moimenta da Beira, 28 July 1909 – Sintra, 17 July 1992). They had four children.

In September 2019, Freitas do Amaral was hospitalized in critical condition at a Cascais hospital. On 3 October 2019, it was announced that Freitas do Amaral had died.

== Electoral history ==
=== Constituent Assembly, 1975 ===
Ballot: 25 April 1975
Party	Candidate	Votes	%	Seats
PS	Mário Soares	2,162,972	37.9	116
PPD	Francisco Sá Carneiro	1,507,282	26.4	81
PCP	Álvaro Cunhal	711,935	12.5	30
CDS	Diogo Freitas do Amaral	434,879	7.6	16
MDP/CDE	Francisco Pereira de Moura	236,318	4.1	5
FSP	Manuel Serra	66,307	1.2	0
MES	Afonso de Barros	58,248	1.0	0
Other parties		137,213	2.4	2
Blank/Invalid ballots		396,675	7.0	–
Turnout		5,711,829	91.66	250
Source: Comissão Nacional de Eleições

=== Legislative election, 1976 ===
Ballot: 25 April 1976
Party	Candidate	Votes	%	Seats	+/−
PS	Mário Soares	1,912,921	34.9	107	–9
PPD	Francisco Sá Carneiro	1,335,381	24.4	73	–8
CDS	Diogo Freitas do Amaral	876,007	16.0	42	+26
PCP	Álvaro Cunhal	788,830	14.4	40	+10
UDP	Mário Tomé	91,690	1.7	1	±0
Other parties		220,936	4.0	0	±0
Blank/Invalid ballots		257,696	2.7	–	–
Turnout		5,483,461	83.53	263	+13
Source: Comissão Nacional de Eleições

=== Presidential election, 1986 ===
Ballot: 26 January and 16 February 1986
Candidate	First round		Second round	
Candidate	Votes	%	Votes	%
Mário Soares	1,443,683	25.4	3,010,756	51.2
Diogo Freitas do Amaral	2,629,597	46.3	2,872,064	48.8
Francisco Salgado Zenha	1,185,867	20.9		
Maria de Lourdes Pintasilgo	418,961	7.4		
Blank/Invalid ballots	64,626	–	54,280	–
Turnout	5,742,734	75.39	5,937,100	77.99
Source: Comissão Nacional de Eleições

=== CDS leadership election, 1988 ===
Ballot: 31 January 1988
Candidate	Votes	%
Diogo Freitas do Amaral	Voice vote	
Turnout		100.0
Source: Congress 1988

=== Legislative election, 1991 ===
Ballot: 6 October 1991
Party	Candidate	Votes	%	Seats	+/−
PSD	Aníbal Cavaco Silva	2,902,351	50.6	135	–13
PS	Jorge Sampaio	1,670,758	29.1	72	+12
CDU	Álvaro Cunhal	504,583	8.8	17	–14
CDS	Diogo Freitas do Amaral	254,317	4.4	5	+1
PSN	Manuel Sérgio	96,096	1.6	1	new
PSR	Francisco Louçã	64,159	1.1	0	±0
Other parties		132,495	2.3	0	–7
Blank/Invalid ballots		110,672	1.9	–	–
Turnout		5,735,431	67.78	230	–20
Source: Comissão Nacional de Eleições

== Ancestors ==
Ancestors of Diogo Pinto de Freitas do Amaral

8. Francisco Pinto de Carvalho do Amaral e Freitas
4. Duarte do Amaral Pinto de Freitas
9. Maria Arminda de Sampaio Leite Ferreira
2. Duarte Pinto de Carvalho de Freitas do Amaral
10. António Mendes Ribeiro
5. Ana Mendes Ribeiro de Oliveira
11. Francisca Augusta de Oliveira
1. Diogo Pinto de Freitas do Amaral
12. Francisco Luís Trocado
6. Josué Francisco Trocado
13. Maria Emília da Cruz e Campos
3. Maria Filomena de Campos Trocado
14. José Fernandes da Silva Campos
7. Maria Alves de Campos
15. Carolina Alves Campos

== Bibliography ==
- D. Afonso Henriques biografia. Lisboa: Bertrand, 2009.
- Camarate: um caso ainda em aberto : apelo de um cidadão. Lisboa: Bertrand, 2010. ISBN 9789722522434
- História do Pensamento Político Ocidental. Coimbra: Almedina, 2011. ISBN 978-972-40-4645-7

Diplomatic posts
Preceded by Amara Essy	President of the United Nations General Assembly; 15 September 1995 – 14 September 1996	Succeeded by Razali Ismail
Political offices
Preceded by João Carlos Lopes Cardoso	Minister of Foreign Affairs; 1980–1981	Succeeded by André Gonçalves Pereira
Preceded by Francisco Sá Carneiro	Acting Prime Minister of Portugal; 1980–1981	Succeeded by Francisco Pinto Balsemão
Preceded by António Monteiro	Minister of Foreign Affairs; 2005–2006	Succeeded by Luís Amado
