= Marcelo Duarte Matias =

Portuguese diplomat

Ambassador of Portugal to France
- In office 23 May 1961 – 19 July 1971
- Nominated by: Américo Tomás
- Preceded by: António Leite de Faria
- Succeeded by: Alfredo Lencastre da Veiga
- In office 30 July 1947 – 29 September 1958
- Nominated by: Óscar Carmona
- Preceded by: Augusto de Castro
- Succeeded by: António Leite de Faria

Minister of Foreign Affairs
- In office 14 August 1958 – 4 May 1961
- Prime Minister: António de Oliveira Salazar
- Preceded by: Paulo Cunha
- Succeeded by: Alberto Franco Nogueira

Personal details
- Born: Marcello Gonçalves Nunes Duarte Mathias; 15 August 1903 Lisbon, Portugal
- Died: 9 June 1999 (aged 95) Estoril, Portugal
- Spouse: Fédora Charles de Zaffiri
- Children: 3, including Leonardo
- Education: University of Lisbon

Marcelo Duarte Matias (15 August 1903, Lisbon – 9 June 1999, Estoril) was a Portuguese diplomat, civil servant, and writer. He served as the Foreign Minister of Portugal, ambassador to France, and Governor of the province of Angola.

Portuguese opposition leader Humberto Delgado went to the Brazilian embassy in Lisbon on 12 January 1959, requesting asylum as he feared the Salazar government would arrest him for challenging Salazar's continued rule, specifically by asking Welsh Labour politician Aneurin Bevan to come to Portugal. As Foreign Minister, Matias refused to recognize Delgado's status as a political refugee. Matias insisted that as a free citizen of Portugal, Delgado had to return to Portugal from Brazil's embassy and then apply to leave Portugal. The diplomatic spat damaged bilateral relations between Brazil and Portugal.
