= João de Freitas do Amaral =

Portuguese politician and journalist

João Pinto de Freitas do Amaral (30 May 1948 – 21 March 1995) was a Portuguese politician and journalist.

== Background ==
He was the fourth but second surviving son of Duarte de Freitas do Amaral and wife Maria Filomena de Campos Trocado and the younger brother of Diogo de Freitas do Amaral.

== Career ==
He was an Assistant to the Secretary of State of Sports and a Journalist, etc.

== Marriages and issue ==
He married firstly in Porto, Nevogilde, on 2 January 1971 and divorced Maria Inês Fernandes Marinho, born in Porto, Nevogilde, 5 April 1946, daughter of Henrique Pascoal Marinho and wife Maria do Céu Pereira Fernandes, and had two children:

- Duarte Fernandes Marinho de Freitas do Amaral (b. Lisbon, 27 November 1971)
- Mariana Fernandes Marinho de Freitas do Amaral (b. Lisbon, 4 July 1974)

He married secondly in Sesimbra on 9 September 1980 and divorced Isabel Maria Braz de Oliveira, born in Lisbon on 16 March 1955, daughter of Roque Braz de Oliveira and wife Maria Carlota Pinto Nogueira, and paternal granddaughter of Cassiano Maria de Oliveira (born Alcongosta, Fundão) and wife Júlia Preto Chagas Braz (born Sesimbra), and had a daughter:

- Maria Brás de Oliveira de Freitas do Amaral (born Lisbon, 28 February 1981)
