= Augusto Santos Silva =

Former President of the Assembly of the Republic (Portugal)

His Excellency Augusto Santos Silva GCL GCC
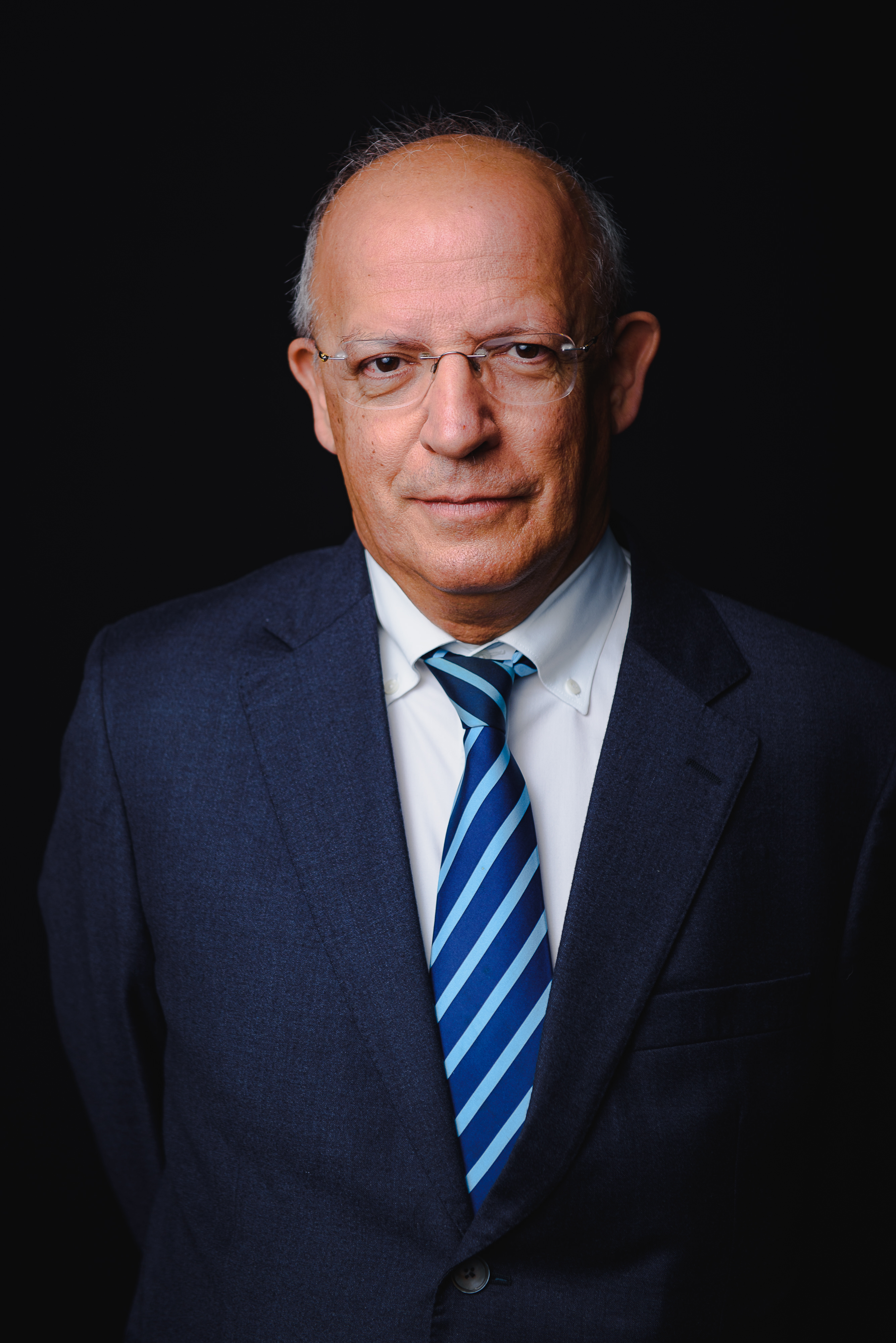
- Silva in 2017

President of the Assembly of the Republic
- In office 29 March 2022 – 25 March 2024
- Preceded by: Eduardo Ferro Rodrigues
- Succeeded by: José Pedro Aguiar-Branco

Minister of Foreign Affairs
- In office 26 November 2015 – 28 March 2022
- Prime Minister: António Costa
- Preceded by: Rui Machete
- Succeeded by: João Gomes Cravinho

Minister of National Defence
- In office 26 October 2009 – 21 June 2011
- Prime Minister: José Sócrates
- Preceded by: Nuno Severiano Teixeira
- Succeeded by: José Pedro Aguiar-Branco

Minister of Parliamentary Affairs
- In office 12 March 2005 – 26 October 2009
- Prime Minister: José Sócrates
- Preceded by: Rui Gomes da Silva
- Succeeded by: Jorge Lacão

Minister of Culture
- In office 3 July 2001 – 6 April 2002
- Prime Minister: António Guterres
- Preceded by: José Sasportes
- Succeeded by: Pedro Roseta

Minister of Education
- In office 14 September 2000 – 3 July 2001
- Prime Minister: António Guterres
- Preceded by: Guilherme d'Oliveira Martins
- Succeeded by: Júlio Pedrosa

Member of the Assembly of the Republic
- In office 29 March 2022 – 25 March 2024
- Constituency: Outside Europe
- In office 20 June 2011 – 22 October 2015
- Constituency: Porto
- In office 5 April 2002 – 14 October 2009
- Constituency: Porto

Personal details
- Born: 20 August 1956 (age 70) Porto, Portugal
- Party: Socialist Party (1991–present)
- Other political affiliations: Internationalist Communist League (1974–1978); Movement of Socialist Left (1980–1991)
- Education: University of Porto (B.A.) (1978); ISCTE – University Institute of Lisbon (Ph.D.) (1992)
- Profession: University professor

Augusto Ernesto dos Santos Silva GCL GCC (born 20 August 1956) is a Portuguese sociologist, university professor, and politician who served as the President of the Assembly of the Republic between 2022 and 2024, in the 15th Legislature. From November 2015 to March 2022, he was the Portuguese Minister of Foreign Affairs, in the XXI and XXII Constitutional Governments led by Prime Minister António Costa.

Santos Silva had previously served in a number of ministerial roles, namely Minister of Education (2000–2001), Minister of Culture (2001–2002), Minister of Parliamentary Affairs (2005–2009), and Minister of National Defence (2009–2011), having joined the Socialist Party in 1990.

== Early life and education ==
Silva was born on 20 August 1956, in the port city of Porto. He graduated from the University of Porto with a degree in history in 1978 and later obtained a doctorate in sociology from ISCTE – University Institute of Lisbon in 1992.

== Academic career ==
Silva started his career as an economics professor in Porto beginning in 1981. Eventually, he worked his way up to Chair of the Scientific Council and served as Dean of the University of Porto from 1998 to 1999.

Silva also served on the National Board of Education from 1996 to 1999, the Commission on Social Security from 1996 to 1998 and the Board of Directors of the José Fontana Foundation from 2002 to 2005, which is affiliated with the Socialist Party. He also represented Portugal in the Council of Europe's Education for Democratic Citizenship project from 1997 to 1999.

== Political career ==
Silva started his political activity while at university, serving as a member of the Porto committee of the Workers' Revolutionary Union, a Trotskyist group aligned with the Internationalist Communist League. In the 1976 presidential election, he supported Otelo Saraiva de Carvalho, and in the 1980 election, he supported António Ramalho Eanes. Silva also joined the Movement of Socialist Left, aligning himself with politicians such as Alberto Martins, Arnaldo Fleming, and Jorge Ribeiro Strecht. In the 1986 election, he was a supporter of Maria de Lourdes Pintasilgo in the first round, followed by Mário Soares in the second.

Five years later, Silva officially joined the Socialist Party.

Silva has served in a number of ministerial roles, beginning in 2000 when he was appointed Minister of Education in the government of Prime Minister António Guterres, which he served as until 2001. At that time, he was appointed Minister of Culture, serving for a year in that role.

From 2005 to 2009, Silva was the Minister of Parliamentary Affairs and the Minister of Defense from 2009 to 2011, both in the governments of Prime Minister José Sócrates.

=== Minister of Foreign Affairs, 2015–2022 ===
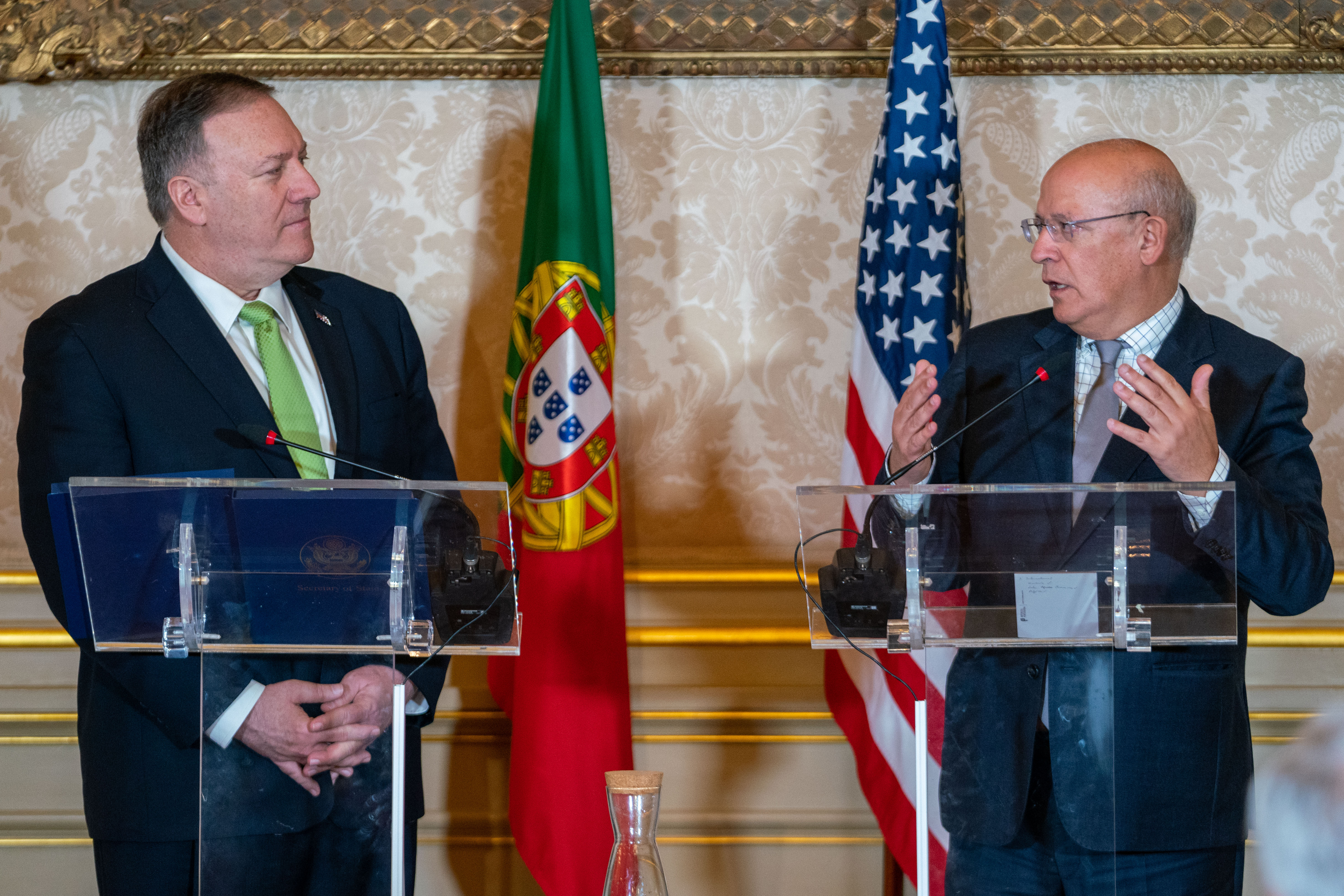
Silva speaks with U.S. Secretary of State Michael R. Pompeo in Lisbon, Portugal on 5 December 2019.

From the beginning of 2015, Silva served as Minister of Foreign Affairs in the government of Prime Minister António Costa. In domestic and international deal-making, Santos Silva and Costa are widely seen as astute negotiators, having been building close ties with other Southern European governments during their time in office.

In a diplomatic row over Venezuela's jailing of Portuguese supermarket managers on charges of gouging food prices, Silva summoned the Venezuelan ambassador to Lisbon in September 2018 and demanded that the problem be resolved swiftly.

In 2020, Santos Silva categorically ruled out joining the so-called 17+1 group of eastern and south-eastern European countries that co-operate on China’s Belt and Road Initiative (BRI), saying this was “not Portugal’s geopolitical space”.

=== President of the Assembly of the Republic, 2022–March 2024 ===
After the 2022 parliamentary election, Santos Silva was elected as President of the Assembly of the Republic, receiving 156 votes in favor, out of the 230 members of Parliament.

== Other activities ==
Silva is also an author, his two most recent works being Os valores da esquerda democrática: vinte teses oferecidas ao escrutínio público ("The values of the democratic Left: twenty propositions for public scrutiny" – 2010), and A sociologia e o debate público: estudos sobre a relação entre conhecer e agir ("Sociology and public debate: studies on the relation between knowing and acting" – 2006). Additionally, he has served as a columnist for the Jornal de Notícias, Público, and TVI 24. Silva has also been documented attending a Bilderberg Group meeting in Ottawa, Canada.

== Honours ==
=== National honours ===
- Grand Cross of the Military Order of Christ (GCC, 9 April 2024)
- Grand Cross of the Order of Liberty (GCL, 30 May 2022)

=== Foreign honours ===
- Greece: Grand Cross of the Order of Honour (21 April 2017)
- Italy: Grand Cross of the Order of Merit of the Italian Republic (1 April 2002)
- Spain:
  - Grand Cross of the Order of Charles III (25 November 2016)
  - Grand Cross of the Order of Isabella the Catholic (14 April 2018)

== Works ==
- Oliveira Martins e o socialismo : ensaio de leitura crítica. Porto : Afrontamento, 1979.
- Teoria e metodologia das ciências sociais : uma análise crítica das contribuições de Durkheim e Max Weber. Porto, 1984.
- Metodologia das ciências sociais. Com José Madureira Pinto. Porto : Afrontamento, 1986.
- Formar a nação : vias culturais do progresso segundo intelectuais portugueses do século XIX. Porto : BEC, 1987.
- Consumos de artesanato : resultados de um inquérito. Com Helena Santos. Porto : Centro Regional de Artes Tradicionais, 1988.
- Projecto para a promoção sociocultural : Centro Regional de Artes Tradicionais. Porto : Centro Regional de Artes Tradicionais, 1988.
- Entre a razão e o sentido : Durkheim, Weber e a teoria das ciências sociais. Porto : Afrontamento, 1988.
- Novos artesãos portugueses : quem são, o que fazem?. Porto : Centro Regional de Artes Tradicionais, 1989.
- Educação de adultos : educação para o desenvolvimento. Porto : Asa, 1990.
- Tempos cruzados : um estudo interpretativo da cultura popular. Porto : Afrontamento, 1994.
- Prática e representação das culturas : um inquérito na área metropolitana do Porto. Com Helena Santos. Porto : Centro Regional de Artes Tradicionais, 1995.
- Avaliação do sistema das escolas profissionais. Coordenação de Júlio Montalvão e Silva. Colaboração de Augusto Santos Silva e José Manuel Prostes da Fonseca. Lisboa : Ministério da Educação, 1996.
- Palavras para um país : estudos incompletos sobre o século XIX português. Oeiras : Celta, 1997.
- Educação para a cidadania democrática : algumas iniciativas em curso na área de Lisboa : projecto. Coordenação e projecto de Augusto Santos Silva. Lisboa : Ministério da Educação, Gabinete de Assuntos Europeus e Relações Internacionais, 1998.
- Parte devida : intervenções públicas, 1992–1998. Porto : Afrontamento, 1999.
- A educação artística e a promoção das artes, na perspectiva das políticas públicas : relatório do Grupo de Contacto entre os Ministérios da Educação e da Cultura. Coordenador. Lisboa : Ministério da Educação, 2000.
- A educação para a cidadania no sistema educativo português : 1974–1999. Com Carla Cibele Figueiredo. Lisboa : Ministério da Educação, 2000.
- Cultura e desenvolvimento : estudos sobre a Relação entre Ser e Agir. Oeiras : Celta, 2000.
- Por uma política de ideias em educação. Porto : Asa, 2002.
- Projecto e circunstância : culturas urbanas em Portugal. Organização de Carlos Fortuna e Augusto Santos Silva. Direção de Boaventura de Sousa Santos. Porto : Afrontamento, 2002.
- A sociologia e o debate público : estudos sobre a relação entre conhecer e agir. Porto : Afrontamento, 2006.
- Os valores da esquerda democrática : vinte teses oferecidas ao escrutínio crítico. Coimbra : Almedina e Fundação Res Publica, 2010.
- Os porquês da esperança : ideias a favor do futuro em Portugal. Com Paulo Magalhães. Lisboa : Matéria-Prima, 2015.

Political offices
Preceded by Guilherme d'Oliveira Martins	Minister of Education; 2000–2001	Succeeded by Júlio Pedrosa
Preceded by José Sasportes	Minister of Culture; 2001–2002	Succeeded by Pedro Roseta
Vacant Title last held by Rui Gomes da Silva	Minister of Parliamentary Affairs; 2005–2009	Succeeded by Jorge Lacão
Preceded by Nuno Severiano Teixeira	Minister of National Defense; 2009–2011	Succeeded by José Pedro Aguiar-Branco
Preceded by Rui Machete	Minister of Foreign Affairs; 2015–2022	Succeeded by João Gomes Cravinho
Preceded by Eduardo Ferro Rodrigues	President of the Assembly of the Republic; 2022–2024	Succeeded by José Pedro Aguiar-Branco
