= António Monteiro (politician) =

Portuguese diplomat (born 1944)

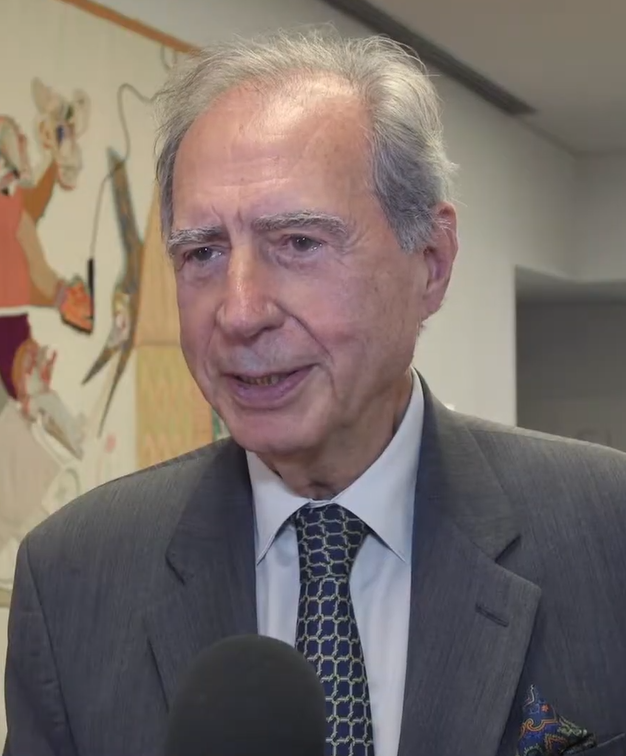

Minister of Foreign Affairs
- In office 17 July 2004 – 12 March 2005
- Preceded by: Teresa Patrício Gouveia
- Succeeded by: Diogo Freitas do Amaral

Personal details
- Born: António Vitor Martins Monteiro; 22 January 1944 (age 82)
- Education: University of Lisbon

António Monteiro (born 22 January 1944) is a Portuguese diplomat who served as the minister of foreign affairs from 2004 to 2005.

== Early life and education ==
Monteiro was born in Angola on 22 January 1944. He received a degree in law from the University of Lisbon in 1967.

== Career ==
Monteiro began his career at the ministry of foreign affairs in 1968. He worked at Portuguese embassies in the Democratic Republic of the Congo (1971) and Italy (1976) and served as permanent representative of Portugal to the Food and Agriculture Organization and alternate governor to the International Fund for Agricultural Development in Rome. In addition, he was deputy permanent representative at the Permanent Mission of Portugal to the United Nations from 1981 to 1987. Then he served at the ministry of foreign affairs in various capacities. He was appointed coordinator of the committee for permanent coordination of the Community of Portuguese Language Countries in 1994 and served in office until 1996. He was also the head of the temporary mission for the peace process structures in Angola and a representative to the joint political and military commission. He headed the security council committee formed by Security Council resolution 661 (dated 1990) about the conflict between Iraq and Kuwait. Then he served as the permanent representative of Portugal to the United Nations from January 1997 to March 2001, representing Portugal on the Security Council during its membership in 1997 and 1998. He was the ambassador of Portugal to France from March 2001 to July 2004.

He was appointed minister of foreign affairs on 17 July 2004, replacing Teresa Patrício Gouveia in the post. Monteiro's term lasted until 12 March 2005, and he was succeeded by Diogo Freitas do Amaral. Monteiro was appointed by the United Nations Secretary-General Kofi Annan as high representative of the United Nations for the elections in Ivory Coast on 15 July 2005. From 2006 to 2009, he again served as ambassador of Portugal to France. In 2009, Monteiro began to work in private sector. In September 2010, he was appointed by the UN Secretary-General Ban Ki-moon as a member to a UN panel tasked with monitoring the referendum that was held in Sudan in 2011. On 28 February 2012, he became chairman of the board of directors of Fundaçao Millennium company.
