= Helena Carreiras =

Portuguese politician, academic and sociologist (born 1965)

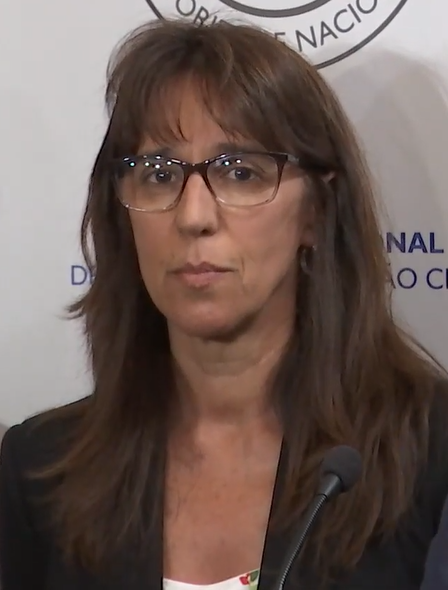

Minister of National Defence
- In office 30 March 2022 – 2 April 2024
- Prime Minister: António Costa
- Preceded by: João Gomes Cravinho
- Succeeded by: Nuno Melo

Personal details
- Born: Maria Helena Chaves Carreiras; 26 September 1965 (age 60) Portalegre, Portugal
- Party: Socialist Party (2022–present)
- Spouse: Andres Malamud (m. 2002)
- Education: ISCTE – University Institute of Lisbon; European University Institute

Maria Helena Chaves Carreiras (born 26 September 1965) is a Portuguese sociologist who has specialized in issues relating to the military, particularly gender aspects. From 2019 she was director of Portugal's National Defence Institute (IDN) and in March 2022 she became Portugal's first female minister of national defence, being replaced in that position following the 2024 national election.

== Early life and education ==
Maria Helena Chaves Carreiras was born on 26 September 1965 in Portalegre in Portugal and lived with her parents and two sisters in a small village called Alpalhão, close to Portalegre, where her parents were primary school teachers. When she was seven, the family moved to Tomar in the Santarém District.

She graduated in sociology in 1987 from ISCTE – University Institute of Lisbon in Lisbon, capital of Portugal. Despite her subsequent interest in military matters, she has said that she was a pacifist while at university. In 1989 she joined ISCTE as a training assistant, teaching sociological methodologies. In the same year she spent a month in the United States as a guest of the Atlantic Council. In 1994 she obtained a master's degree from the ISCTE, with the thesis, Women-Soldiers or Soldiers-Women: A study on female participation in the Portuguese Armed Forces. In 1999, she was a visiting scholar in the Department of Women's Studies at the University of California, Berkeley.

She studied for a PhD in Social and Political Sciences from the European University Institute, based in Fiesole near Florence in Italy. While there, she met her husband, Andrés Malamud, now a professor at the University of Lisbon. They have two children, a son and a daughter. Carreiras received her PhD in 2004 with a thesis on the subject of the gender integration policies of the armed forces of NATO countries.

== Academic career ==
After obtaining a PhD, Carreiras returned to work with ISCTE, becoming an associate professor of sociology, public policy and research methodology at the School of Sociology and Public Policy and a senior researcher at the Centre for Research and Studies in Sociology (CIES).

From 2004 to 2006, Carreiras served as vice-president of the Portuguese Sociology Association. In 1997, she became a member of the editorial board of the publications Nação e Defesa and Sociologia – Problems e Práticas. She was a member of the board of the European Sociological Association between 2009 and 2013. From 2010 to 2012, she was deputy director of the National Defence Institute (IDN), an organization that is independent of the Ministry of National Defence and provides academic support to the formulation and development of national strategic thinking in areas related to security and defence.

Returning to ISCTE after her time at IDN, Carreiras was a visiting professor at the Department of Government at Georgetown University in Washington, D.C. in 2013. In 2015, she was deputy director of CIES and in 2016, she became dean of the School of Sociology at ISCTE. Between 2017 and 2019 she was president of the European Research Group on Military and Society (ERGOMAS). From 2018 to 2019 she was deputy director of the Institute for Public and Social Policies at ISCTE and was on the general council of ISCTE. In 2019 she became the first woman to head the National Defence Institute.

== Minister of Defence, 2022–2024 ==
On 23 March 2022 Carreiras was appointed as minister of national defence in the XXIII Constitutional Government of Portugal under prime minister António Costa. She served in that position until after the 2024 election. Again, she was the first woman to hold that office.

== Research interests and publications ==
Carreiras has researched topics related to gender and society, the armed forces, security and defence, and qualitative research methodology. Much of her work has focused on gender integration in military institutions and gender aspects of international security. As of the beginning of 2022, she was the author of 14 books, 48 book chapters and 27 journal articles. These include:

- Understanding the Impact of Social Research on the Military. 2022. (edited, with Eyal Ben-Ari and Celso Castro), Routledge. ISBN 9780367760311.
- Researching the Military. 2016. (edited, with Celso Castro and Sabina Frederic), Routledge. ISBN 9781138309241.
- Qualitative Methods in Military Studies. 2013. (edited, with Celso Castro), Routledge. ISBN 9781138797482.
- Women in the Military and in Armed Conflict. 2008. (edited, with Gerhard Kümmel), Springer. ISBN 9783531909356.
- Gender and the Military. Women in the Armed Forces of Western Democracies. 2006. Routledge. ISBN 9780415472081.
