= José Lopes da Silva =

José Lopes da Silva may refer to:

- Gabriel Mariano (José Gabriel Lopes da Silva, 1928–2002), Cape Verdean poet, novelist, and an essayist
- José Lopes da Silva (poet, born 1872) (1872–1962), Cape Verdean professor, journalist and poet
