= Eurico de Melo =

Portuguese politician (1925–2012)

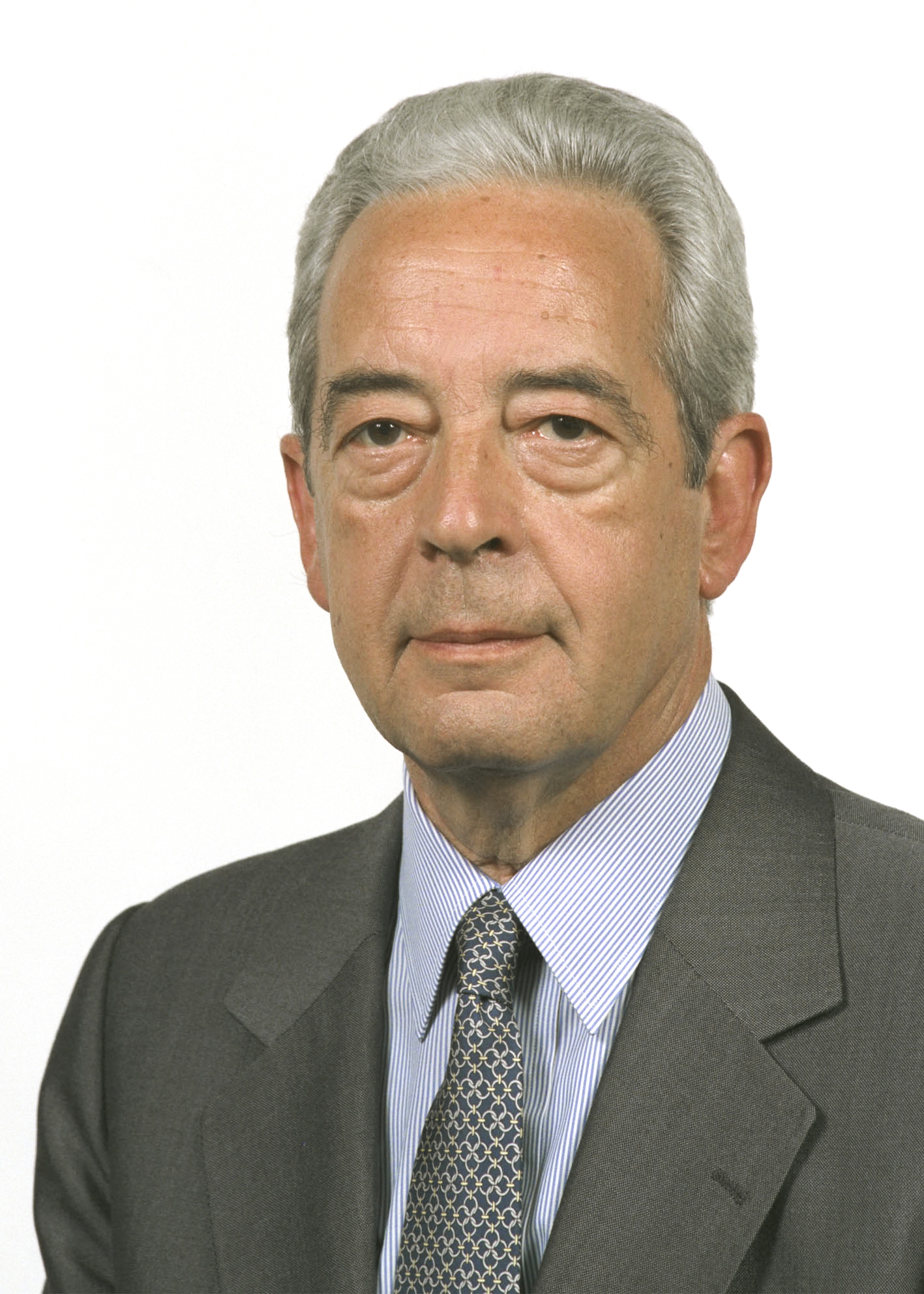
- Melo in 1994

Deputy Prime Minister of Portugal
- In office 17 August 1987 – 5 January 1990
- Prime Minister: Aníbal Cavaco Silva
- Preceded by: Rui Machete
- Succeeded by: Paulo Portas

Minister of Internal Administration
- In office 6 November 1985 – 17 August 1987
- Prime Minister: Aníbal Cavaco Silva
- Preceded by: Eduardo Pereira
- Succeeded by: José Silveira Godinho
- In office 3 January 1980 – 9 January 1981
- Prime Minister: Francisco Sá Carneiro
- Preceded by: Manuel da Costa Braz
- Succeeded by: Fernando Amaral

Member of the European Parliament
- In office 19 July 1994 – 19 July 1999
- Constituency: Portugal

Member of the Assembly of the Republic
- In office 4 November 1985 – 3 November 1991
- Constituency: Braga

Personal details
- Born: Eurico Silva Teixeira de Melo; 28 September 1925 Santo Tirso, Santo Tirso, Portugal
- Died: 1 August 2012 (aged 86) Porto, Portugal
- Party: Social Democratic Party
- Education: University of Porto
- Occupation: Engineer • politician

Eurico Silva Teixeira de Melo (28 September 1925 – 1 August 2012) was a Portuguese politician and engineer, who served as Deputy Prime Minister from 1987 until 1990.

== Biography ==
Eurico de Melo was born in 1925, in Santo Tirso. He studied Engineering in the University of Porto, later becoming an assistant professor in that university.

After the Carnation Revolution, he joined the Social Democratic Party. He was the Civil Governor of Braga District from 1975 until 1976.

Melo became the Minister of Internal Administration in 1980, under the government of Francisco Sá Carneiro. Sá Carneiro reportedly was looking to resign and appoint Eurico de Melo as Prime Minister if Ramalho Eanes won re-election in the 1980 presidential election, which didn't end up happening after the Camarate accident and the death of the Prime Minister.

He became once again the Minister of Internal Administration in the first cabinet of Aníbal Cavaco Silva and, after the PSD won an absolute majority in the 1987 legislative election, he became Deputy Prime Minister.

He left the office after a cabinet reshuffle in January 1990, later becoming the PSD's main candidate in the 1994 European Parliament election. He was elected as a Member of the European Parliament, being in office from 1994 until 1999.

Melo died in 2012, in Porto, at 86 years old.

== Electoral history ==
=== European Parliament election, 1994 ===
Ballot: 12 June 1994
Party	Candidate	Votes	%	Seats	+/−
PS	António Vitorino	1,061,560	34.9	10	+3
PSD	Eurico de Melo	1,046,918	34.4	9	±0
CDS–PP	Manuel Monteiro	379,044	12.5	3	±0
CDU	Luis Manuel de Sá	340,725	11.2	3	–1
Other parties		121,498	4.0	0	–1
Blank/Invalid ballots		94,236	3.1	–	–
Turnout		3,044,001	35.54	25	+1
Source: Comissão Nacional de Eleições
