= José Pedro Aguiar-Branco =

Portuguese politician (born 1957)

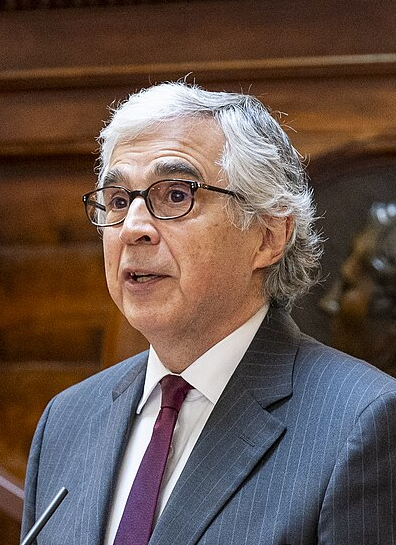
- Aguiar-Branco in 2024

President of the Assembly of the Republic
- Incumbent
- Assumed office 27 March 2024
- Preceded by: Augusto Santos Silva

Minister of National Defence
- In office 21 June 2011 – 26 November 2015
- Prime Minister: Pedro Passos Coelho
- Preceded by: Augusto Santos Silva
- Succeeded by: José Alberto Azeredo Lopes

Minister of Justice
- In office 17 July 2004 – 12 March 2005
- Prime Minister: Pedro Santana Lopes
- Preceded by: Celeste Cardona
- Succeeded by: Alberto Costa

Member of the Assembly of the Republic
- Incumbent
- Assumed office 26 March 2024
- Constituency: Viana do Castelo
- In office 10 March 2005 – 20 January 2019
- Constituency: Porto

Personal details
- Born: José Pedro Correia de Aguiar-Branco; July 18, 1957 (age 69) Lordelo do Ouro, Porto, Portugal
- Party: Social Democratic Party (since 1974)
- Spouse: Maria Helena Soares (m. 1980)
- Children: 5
- Education: University of Coimbra

José Pedro Correia de Aguiar-Branco (born 18 July 1957) is a Portuguese lawyer and politician who has been the President of the Assembly of the Republic since 2024, in the 16th Legislature. Previously he served as Minister of Justice from 2004 to 2005 and Minister of National Defence from 2011 to 2015.

In 2024, he was elected as member of the Assembly of the Republic in the 2024 legislative elections, for the Viana do Castelo constituency.

== Honours ==
=== Foreign ===
- Lithuania: Grand Cross of the Order for Merits to Lithuania (9 November 2019)
- Poland: Grand Cross of the Order of Merit of the Republic of Poland (28 February 2018)
- Romania: Grand Officer of the Order of the Star of Romania (28 February 2018)
- Slovakia: Order of the White Double Cross, 2nd Class (civilian type) (2 November 2026)
- Spain: Knight Grand Cross of the Order of Isabella the Catholic (19 February 2018)

== Personal life ==
Aguiar-Branco married in 1980 Maria Helena Soares, with whom he has five children.

He is a supporter of same-sex adoption.
