= João Gomes Cravinho =

Portuguese politician and diplomat (born 1964)

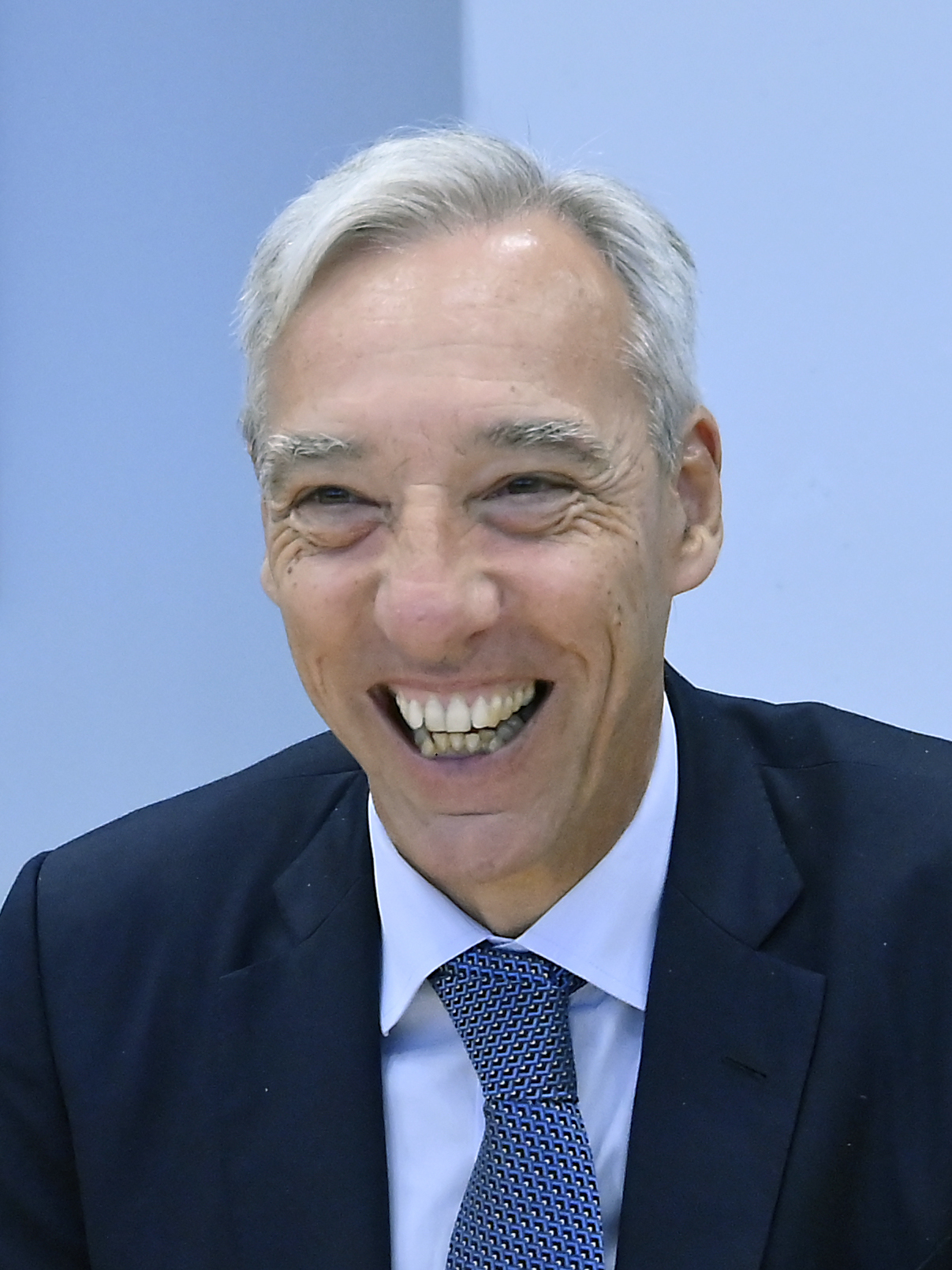
- Cravinho in 2023

Rector of the College of Europe
- Incumbent
- Assumed office 1 July 2026
- Preceded by: Ewa Ośniecka-Tamecka (acting)

Minister of Foreign Affairs
- In office 30 March 2022 – 2 April 2024
- Prime Minister: António Costa
- Preceded by: Augusto Santos Silva
- Succeeded by: Paulo Rangel

Minister of National Defence
- In office 15 October 2018 – 30 March 2022
- Prime Minister: António Costa
- Preceded by: José Alberto Azeredo Lopes
- Succeeded by: Helena Carreiras

Secretary of State for Foreign Affairs and Cooperation
- In office 20 March 2005 – 21 June 2011
- Prime Minister: José Sócrates
- Preceded by: Henrique de Freitas
- Succeeded by: Luís Brites Pereira

Diplomatic posts
- 2015–2018: Ambassador of the European Union to Brazil
- 2011–2015: Ambassador of the European Union to India

Personal details
- Born: 16 June 1964 (age 62) Lisbon, Portugal
- Relatives: João Cravinho (father)
- Education: London School of Economics; University of Oxford

João Titterington Gomes Cravinho (born 16 June 1964) is a Portuguese diplomat and politician who served as Minister of Foreign Affairs in the government of Prime Minister António Costa between 2022 and 2024. Previously, he had served as Minister of National Defence.

In April 2026, he was appointed as Rector of the College of Europe.

== Career ==
During his time in the European External Action Service, Cravinho served as Head of the European Union's delegation to Brazil from 2015 until 2018 and India from 2011 until 2015. Prior to that, he occupied the post of Secretary of State for Foreign Affairs and Cooperation in José Sócrates's government.

Under Cravinho's leadership as Minister of National Defence, the Portuguese Air Force purchased five KC-390 military transport aircraft and a flight simulator from Brazilian aerospace company Embraer for 827 million euros ($932 million) in 2019.

In 2020, Cravinho announced Portugal's army would help Mozambique train local soldiers, marines and other forces to tackle an insurgency in Cabo Delgado. By May 2021, Cravinho and his Mozambican counterpart Jaime Neto signed an agreement in which Portugal committed to increasing its number of troops in Mozambique to 80 by 2026 and training Mozambican soldiers to tackle the insurgency, share intelligence and help the country use drones to track the militants' movements.

== Education ==
- 1991–1995 Doctorate: D.Phil., St. Antony’s College, University of Oxford.
  - Title of thesis: Modernizing Mozambique: Frelimo Ideology and the Frelimo State
- 1986–1987 Master's degree: M.Sc.(Econ), London School of Economics
  - Course: Politics of the World Economy
- 1983–1986 Bachelor’s degree: B.Sc.(Econ), London School of Economics
  - Course: International Relations
- 1980–1982 International Baccalaureate, United World College of the Atlantic

== Other activities ==
- European Council on Foreign Relations (ECFR), Member of the Council

== Honours ==
=== Foreign honours ===
- Central African Republic: Commander of the Order of Central African Merit (19 December 2019)
- France: Commander of the National Order of Legion of Honour (16 September 2021)

Political offices
Preceded by Augusto Santos Silva	Minister of Foreign Affairs; 2022–2024	Succeeded by Paulo Rangel
