= Ministry of National Defence (Portugal) =

Government ministry of Portugal

- Ministério da Defesa Nacional
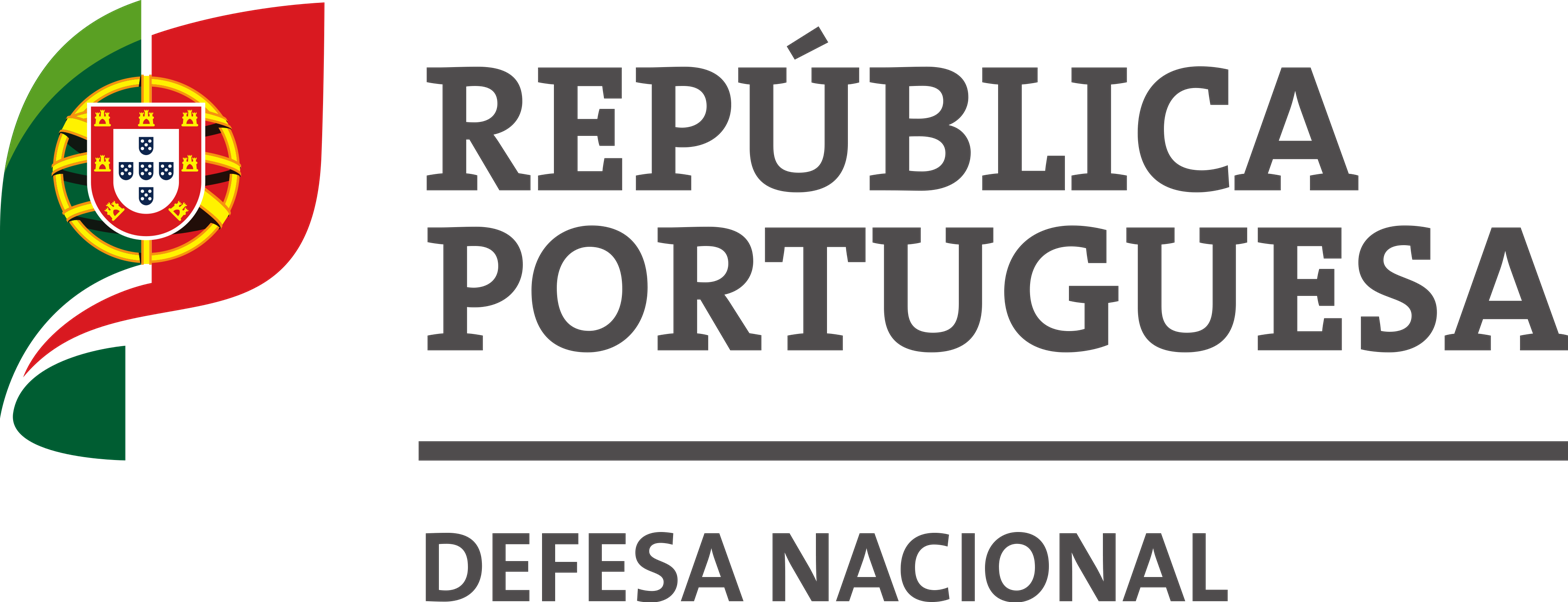
- Logo of the ministry

- Flag of the minister

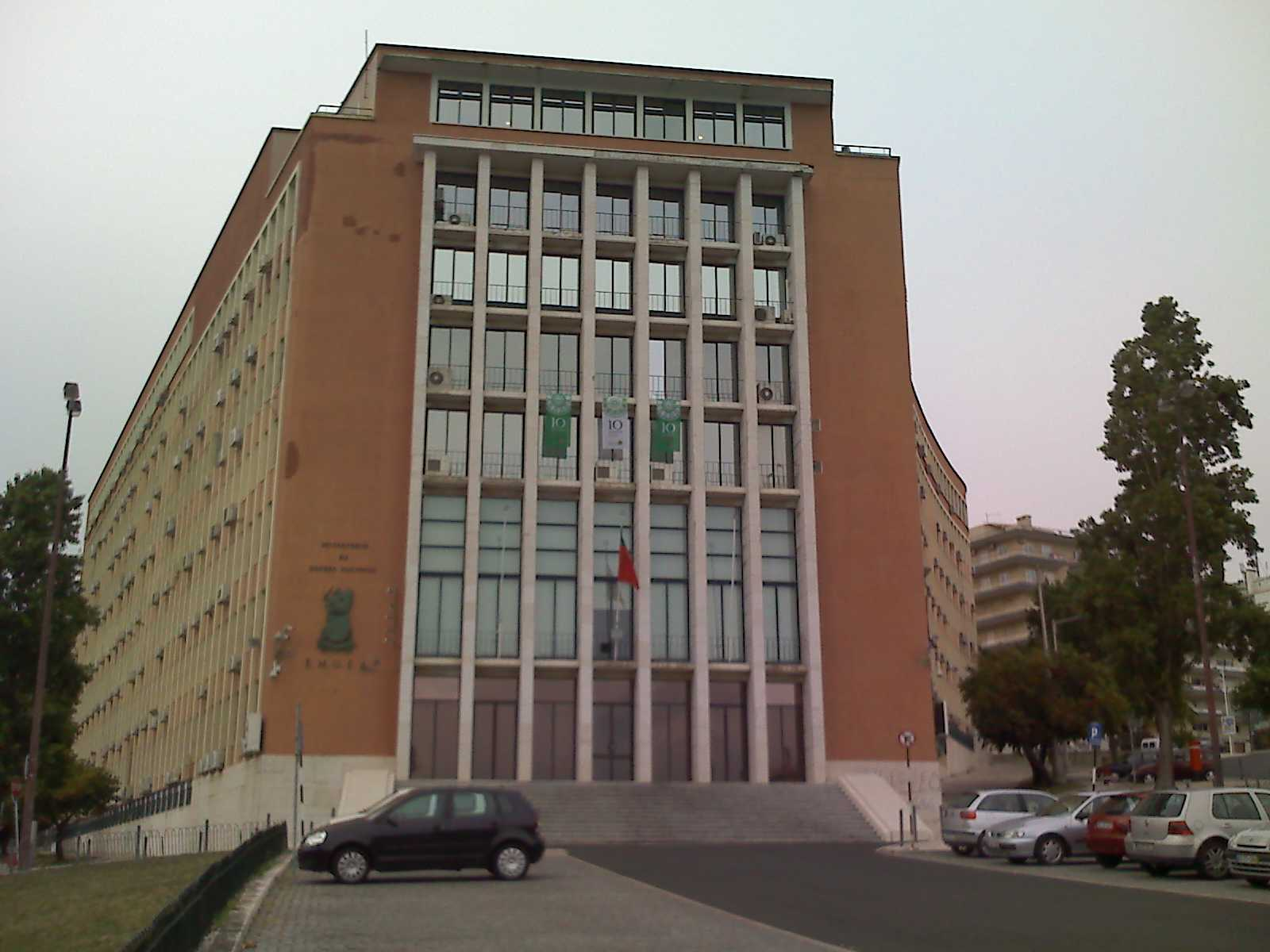
- Headquarters of the ministry, Lisbon

Ministry overview
- Formed: 1974
- Preceding agencies: Department of National Defence; Army Ministry; Navy Ministry
- Type: Ministry of defence
- Jurisdiction: Government of Portugal
- Headquarters: Avenida da Ilha da Madeira 1, Lisbon, Portugal; 38°42′15.5484″N 9°12′24.2424″W
- Ministry executives: Nuno Melo, Minister of National Defence; Álvaro Castelo-Branco, Deputy Minister and for National Defence; Ana Isabel Xavier, Secretary of State for National Defence
- Website: Portal da Defesa Nacional

Footnotes
- Between 1950 and 1974 there was a minister of National Defence, but not a ministry of National Defence, it was given the name Department of National Defence.

The Ministry of National Defence (Portuguese: Ministério da Defesa Nacional or MDN) is a Portuguese government ministry, which is responsible for preparing and executing the national defence policy, within the scope of its powers, as well as ensuring and supervising the administration of the Portuguese Armed Forces.

== Mission ==
- Participate in the definition of the national defence policy and elaborate and execute the policy related to its military component;
- Ensure and supervise the administration of the Armed Forces;
- Ensure the preparation of the means available to the Armed Forces and monitor and inspect their use;
- Define, execute and coordinate human, material and financial resources policies;
- Coordinate and guide actions related to the satisfaction of military commitments arising from international agreements, as well as relations with international organizations of a military nature, without prejudice to the Ministry of Foreign Affairs' own attributions;
- Prepare the Ministry's budget and guide the drafting of draft proposals for the Military Programming Law (LPM), coordinating and supervising the respective execution;
- Support the financing of actions, through the attribution of subsidies and the execution of transfers within the scope of the programs that are committed to it;
- To promote and dynamize the study, investigation, technological development and dissemination of matters of interest to national defence;
- Provide, in order to guarantee, the security of classified matters, either in Portugal or in national representations abroad;
- Perform the functions assigned to it within the scope of the Information System of the Portuguese Republic;
- Provide technical and administrative support to the Superior Council for National Defence and the Prime Minister, in the exercise of their functions, in matters of national defence and the Armed Forces.

== Organization ==
The Ministry of National Defence is structured as follows:

- Armed forces:
  - Armed Forces General Staff;
  - Portuguese Navy;
  - Portuguese Army;
  - Portuguese Air Force.
- Central services integrated in the direct administration:
  - General secretary:
  - Directorate-General for National Defence Policy;
  - Directorate-General for National Defence Resources;
  - General Inspection of National Defence;
  - National Defence Institute;
  - Military Judicial Police.
- Authorities:
  - Maritime Authority System;
  - National Aeronautical Authority.
- Commissions:
  - Coordinating Committee for the Evocation of the Centenary of World War I;
  - Portuguese Military History Commission.
- Tutored bodies:
  - Armed Forces Social Action Institute
  - Portuguese Red Cross;
  - League of Combatants.

== List of Ministers (since 1974) ==
Colour key
(for political parties)
Socialist Party (PS)
Social Democratic Party (PSD)
Democratic and Social Center (CDS)
Independent (Ind.)

#	Portrait	Name	Took office	Left office	Party	Prime Minister
1		Mário Firmino Miguel (1932–1991)	16 May 1974	30 September 1974	Ind.	Adelino da Palma Carlos
–	Vacant office		30 September 1974	3 October 1974		Vasco Gonçalves
2		Vítor Alves (1935–2011)	3 October 1974	24 February 1975	Ind.	Vasco Gonçalves
3		Silvano Ribeiro (1923–2004)	24 February 1975	19 September 1975	Ind.	Vasco Gonçalves
4		José Pinheiro de Azevedo (1917–1983)	19 September 1975	23 July 1976	Ind.	José Pinheiro de Azevedo
5		Mário Firmino Miguel (1932–1991)	23 July 1976	22 November 1978	Ind.	Mário Soares
5		Mário Firmino Miguel (1932–1991)	23 July 1976	22 November 1978	Ind.	Alfredo Nobre da Costa
6		José Loureiro dos Santos (1932–1991)	22 November 1978	3 January 1980	Ind.	Carlos Mota Pinto
6		José Loureiro dos Santos (1932–1991)	22 November 1978	3 January 1980	Ind.	Maria Lourdes Pintasilgo
7		Adelino Amaro da Costa (1943–1980)	3 January 1980	4 December 1980	CDS	Francisco Sá Carneiro
–	Vacant office		4 December 1980	9 January 1981		Diogo Freitas do Amaral
8		Luís de Azevedo Coutinho (1928–2016)	9 January 1981	4 September 1981	CDS	Francisco Pinto Balsemão
9		Diogo Freitas do Amaral (1941–2019)	4 September 1981	25 February 1983	CDS	Francisco Pinto Balsemão
10		Ricardo Bayão Horta (b. 1936)	25 February 1983	9 June 1983	CDS	Francisco Pinto Balsemão
11		Carlos Mota Pinto (1936–1985)	9 June 1983	15 February 1985	PSD	Mário Soares
12		Rui Machete (b. 1940)	15 February 1985	6 November 1985	PSD	Mário Soares
13		Leonardo Ribeiro de Almeida (1924–2006)	6 November 1985	17 August 1987	PSD	Aníbal Cavaco Silva
14		Eurico de Melo (1925–2012)	17 August 1987	5 January 1990	PSD	Aníbal Cavaco Silva
15		Carlos Brito (b. 1935)	5 January 1990	5 March 1990	PSD	Aníbal Cavaco Silva
16		Fernando Nogueira (b. 1950)	5 March 1990	16 March 1995	PSD	Aníbal Cavaco Silva
17		António Figueiredo Lopes (b. 1936)	16 March 1995	28 October 1995	PSD	Aníbal Cavaco Silva
18		António Vitorino (b. 1957)	28 October 1995	25 November 1997	PS	António Guterres
19		José Veiga Simão (1929–2014)	25 November 1997	29 May 1999	PS	António Guterres
20		Jaime Gama (b. 1947)	29 May 1999	25 October 1999	PS	António Guterres
21		Júlio Castro Caldas (1943–2020)	25 October 1999	3 July 2001	Ind.	António Guterres
22		Rui Pena (1939–2018)	3 July 2001	6 April 2002	Ind.	António Guterres
23		Paulo Portas (b. 1962)	6 April 2002	12 March 2005	CDS	José Durão Barroso
23		Paulo Portas (b. 1962)	6 April 2002	12 March 2005	CDS	Pedro Santana Lopes
24		Luís Amado (b. 1953)	12 March 2005	3 July 2006	PS	José Sócrates
25		Nuno Severiano Teixeira (b. 1957)	3 July 2006	26 October 2009	PS	José Sócrates
26		Augusto Santos Silva (b. 1956)	26 October 2009	21 June 2011	PS	José Sócrates
27		José Pedro Aguiar-Branco (b. 1957)	21 June 2011	26 November 2015	PSD	Pedro Passos Coelho
28		José Azeredo Lopes (b. 1961)	26 November 2015	15 October 2018	Ind.	António Costa
29		João Gomes Cravinho (b. 1964)	15 October 2018	30 March 2022	PS	António Costa
30		Helena Carreiras (b. 1965)	30 March 2022	2 April 2024	PS	António Costa
31		Nuno Melo (b. 1966)	2 April 2024	present	CDS	Luís Montenegro
