= José Alberto Azeredo Lopes =

Portuguese politician

José Alberto de Azeredo Lopes
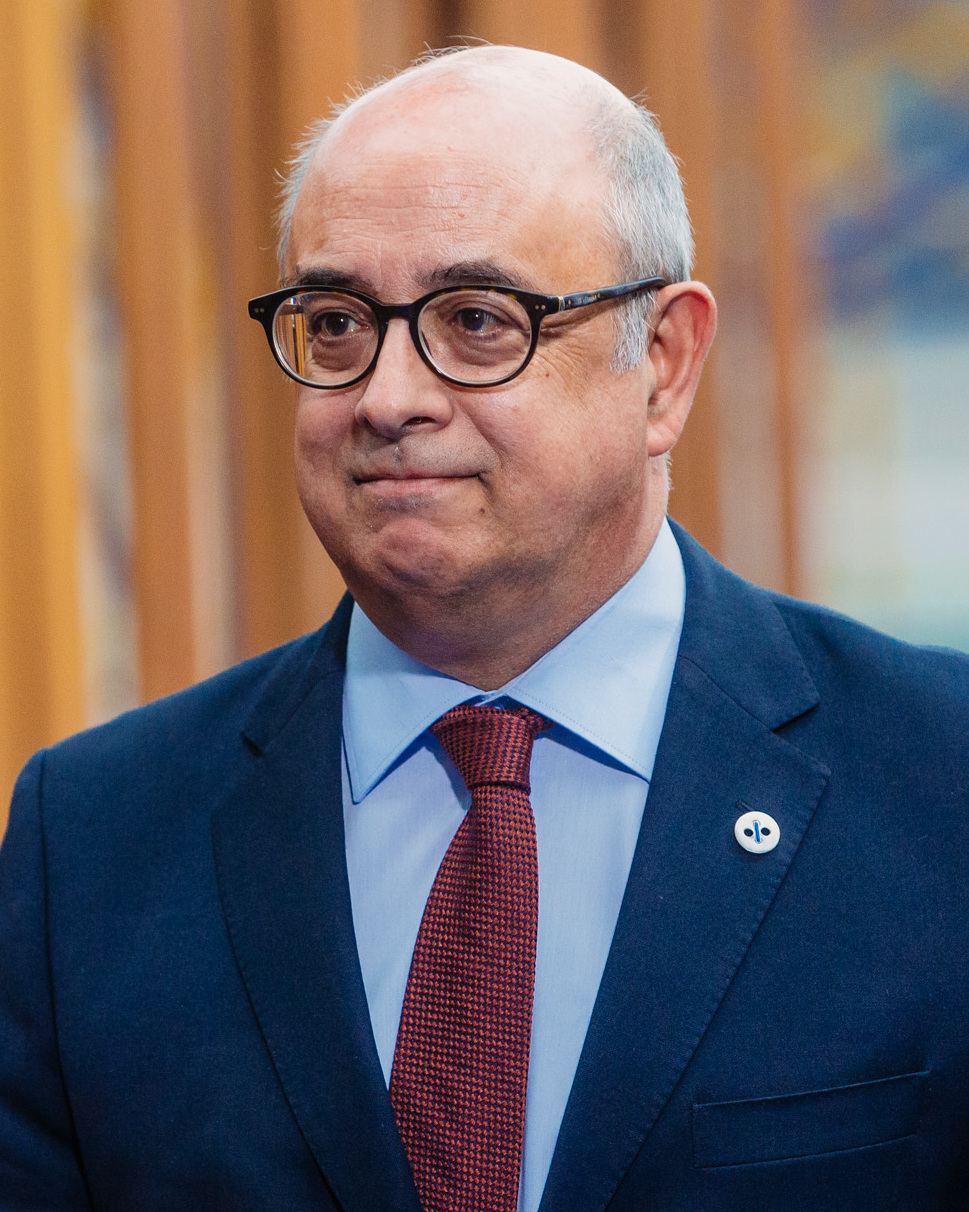

Minister of National Defence
- In office 26 November 2015 – 15 October 2018
- Prime Minister: António Costa
- Preceded by: José Pedro Aguiar-Branco
- Succeeded by: João Gomes Cravinho

Personal details
- Born: 20 June 1961 (age 65) Porto, Portugal

José Alberto de Azeredo Lopes (born 20 June 1961) is a Portuguese politician who served as Minister of National Defence from November 2015 to October 2018.

Azeredo Lopes previously served as the president of the Regulatory Authority for the Media and was a law professor at the Catholic University of Portugal. He announced his resignation as National Defence Minister on 12 October 2018 amid an investigation into a theft of weapons from a military base, and was succeeded by João Gomes Cravinho on 15 October 2018. In 2019, he was brought to trial over his alleged role in a suspected army cover-up of a theft of grenades, anti-tank rockets, other explosives and ammunition from a military arms depot in 2017; he himself has repeatedly denied any wrongdoing.
