= Vítor Alves (soldier) =

Portuguese soldier and politician

Vitor Alves (center) in Angola

Vitor Manuel Rodrigues Alves (30 September 1935 – 9 January 2011) was a Portuguese soldier and politician. Alves, a former Captain of the Movimento das Forças Armadas (MFA), is regarded as a leading figure in the Carnation Revolution, which transitioned Portugal from an authoritarian dictatorship to a democracy.

== Biography ==
Born in Mafra, he was the son of Eduardo Manuel da Silva Alves and D. Maria Palmira Rodrigues.

He joined the Military School on 14 October 1954, and was a corporal by 1956, before attaining the rank of ensign in the infantry (1 November 1958). He obtained his first military commission to Mozambique (1958–1963); where he was assigned to the 2nd Division Regional Military detachment in Mozambique, obtaining the position of Lieutenant by 1 December 1960.

He was married on 29 March 1962, in the provincial town of Lourenço Marques, to Maria Teresa Gomes Ferreira de Almeida Alves, daughter of Eugénio Ferreira de Almeida and Ermelinda Teixeira Gomes.

Alves continued a successful military assignment with his promotion to Captain (14 July 1963), before being reassigned to a military commission in Angola (1963–1966). Before being included in the military commission in Angola (1967–1970), he was decorated with the Medal of Military Merit, 3rd Class in 1969. He was also decorated with the Governor General's Prize in Angola (1969) and Silver Medal for distinct service (1970).

=== Carnation Revolution ===
Vitor Manuel Rodrigues Alves obtained the rank of Major by 1 March 1972.

He became an active member of the group Direcção do Movimento dos Capitães of the MFA by 1973 and member of the political commission of the MFA by 8 March 1974. Alves helped to ensure that the uprising was not merely a military coup. At the time, his home was used by the conspirators for secret meetings, where he promoted the idea of including the generals in the National Salvation Junta, in order to give the revolution respectability. What followed was a full-scale civil revolution on the heels of a military coup.

During the Hot Summer (Portuguese: Verão Quente) period, Alves twice served as a government minister (defence and education) and once without portfolio, as a spokesman for the MFA. One of his projects during this period was a series of laws to help liberalize media activity, which were implemented until 1999.

=== Later life ===
In 1982, Alves was appointed as an advisor to Portuguese President Ramalho Eanes. Alves later reached the rank of Colonel before transitioning into the army reserves in 1991, then retiring in 2001.

Alves died from cancer at the Hospital Militar in Lisbon, Portugal, on 9 January 2011, at the age of 75. He had been hospitalized for a period of time. His colleague, Otelo de Carvalho remembered Alves as "...an extremely important figure. He was always very moderate, always insisting that we should be realistic. And his arguments convinced us. He was a diplomat, and a gentleman to boot."
