= Rui Machete =

Portuguese politician

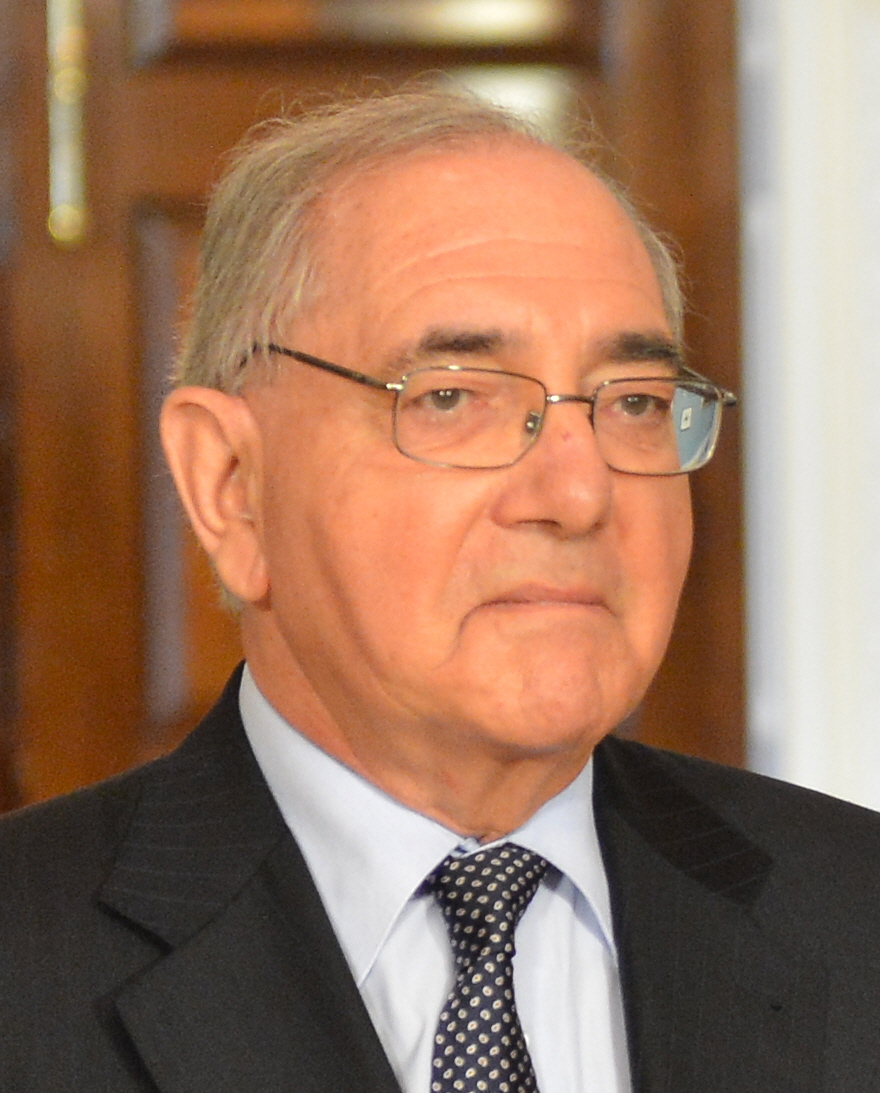

President of the Social Democratic Party
- In office 10 February 1985 – 19 May 1985
- Secretary-General: Francisco Antunes da Silva
- Preceded by: Carlos Mota Pinto
- Succeeded by: Aníbal Cavaco Silva

Ministerial offices
- 2013–2015: Minister of Foreign Affairs
- 2013–2015: Minister of State
- 1985–1985: Deputy Prime Minister of Portugal
- 1985–1985: Minister of National Defence
- 1983–1985: Minister of Justice
- 1976–1976: Minister of Social Affairs

Personal details
- Born: 7 April 1940 (age 86) Setúbal, Portugal
- Party: Social Democratic Party
- Spouse: Maria Fernanda Ferreira Pena
- Children: 3
- Education: University of Lisbon

Rui Manuel Parente Chancerelle de Machete (born 7 April 1940) is a Portuguese politician. Machete served as Minister of Social Affairs from 1976 to 1979, Minister of Justice from 1983 to 1985, Deputy Prime Minister and Minister of National Defense in 1985, and Minister of State and Foreign Affairs from 2013 to 2015. He was the leader of the Social Democratic Party in 1985.

== Honours ==
=== National ===
- Grand Cross of the Military Order of Christ (15 June 1988)

=== Foreign ===
- Mexico: Sash of the Order of the Aztec Eagle (15 September 2015)
- Yugoslavia: Order of the Yugoslav Flag with Golden Wreath (9 July 1976)
