= Ministry of Foreign Affairs (Portugal) =

Government ministry of Portugal

- Ministério dos Negócios Estrangeiros
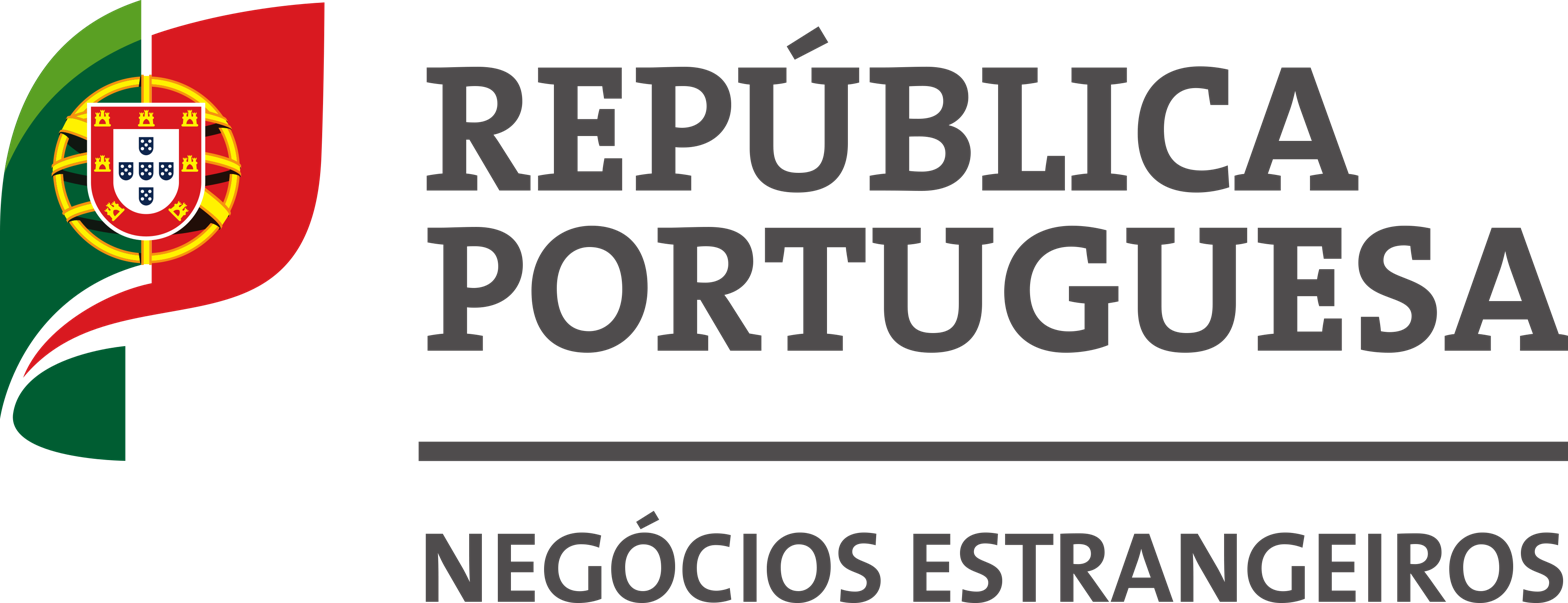
- Logo of the ministry

- Flag of the minister

- Palace of Necessidades, Lisbon

Ministry overview
- Formed: 27 September 1820
- Preceding Ministry: Secretariat of State of Foreign Affairs and War
- Type: Ministry of foreign affairs
- Jurisdiction: Government of Portugal
- Headquarters: Palace of Necessidades, Lisbon, Portugal; 38°42′25.2072″N 9°10′15.42″W
- Ministry executives: Paulo Rangel, Minister of State and Foreign Affairs; Inês Domingos, Secretary of State for European Affairs; Ana Isabel Xavier, Secretary of State for Foreign Affairs and Cooperation; Emídio Sousa, Secretary of State for the Portuguese Communities
- Child agencies: Instituto Camões; AICEP Portugal Global
- Website: Diplomatic Portal

The Ministry of Foreign Affairs (Portuguese: Ministério dos Negócios Estrangeiros, MNE), is the Portuguese governmental department responsible for the formulation, coordination, and execution of the foreign policy. The Ministry has its headquarters in the Palácio das Necessidades, in Lisbon. Its current head is the Minister of State and of Foreign Affairs, Paulo Rangel. There are three Secretaries of State which are part of the Ministry: European Affairs; Foreign Affairs and Cooperation; and Portuguese Communities.

== History ==
Although Portugal has a long history of diplomatic activity, dating back to the County of Portugal, the first Secretariat of State dedicated to State Affairs was created by a decree issued by D. João IV, after the Portuguese Restoration, on 29 November 1643. This Secretariat of State was in charge of all affairs relating to negotiations (treaties, weddings and alliances), communication with foreign rulers in matters of peace and war, and with the sending of diplomatic agents abroad.

Later, in the reign of D. João V, the Public administration was reorganized, by a royal decree issued on 28 July 1736, which resulted in the creation of three Secretariats of State – the Kingdom's Interior Affairs, Navy and Overseas Domains, and Foreign Affairs and War – in replacement of the Secretariats of State created in 1643, namely the Secretariat of State, the Secretariat of Mercy and Expedient, and the Secretariat of Signature. Therefore, the existence of a Secretariat of State dedicated to Foreign Affairs dates from 1736, although it was only in 1738 that the first Secretary of State took office.

Foreign Affairs and War were kept in the same Secretariat, except for an ephemeral split from 6 January to 28 July 1801, until 1820, when an Ordinance of the Provisional Junta of the Government, issued on 27 September of that year, determined its separation in two distinct branches of the Public Administration. This separation was confirmed by the Legal Charter of 12 June 1822, which restructured the Secretariats of State, and established the Secretariat of State of Foreign Affairs.

Throughout time, the Secretariat of State for Foreign Affairs was assigned, through the different diplomas that regulated its functioning, the competences that to this day belong to the Ministry of Foreign Affairs. Since the mid 19th century, the designation "Ministry" began to be preferentially used instead of "Secretariat of State" to designate the governmental departments, thus leading to the establishment of the name "Ministry of Foreign Affairs", used to this day.

== Mission ==
The Ministry of Foreign Affairs (MFA) formulates, coordinates, and executes the Portuguese foreign policy. The Ministry has the responsibility of ensuring the representation of the Portuguese State in other countries and international organizations, through its External Network of embassies, permanent missions, and consular posts. Therefore, the Ministry is responsible for Portugal's action abroad. During his time as Minister of Foreign Affairs, José Manuel Durão Barroso summarized the role of the Ministry by describing it as "the expert on political issues, tough concomitantly a generalist is all issues – economic, cultural, or of other kinds – which in any way are relevant in the defense or the promotion of our interests in the international sphere".

According to its webpage, the Ministry has the following responsibilities: "protecting Portuguese citizens abroad, conducting international negotiations and international ties (agreements and treaties) of the Portuguese State, conducting and coordinating Portuguese participation in the process of European construction, and promotion of cooperative relations and friendship with the various international partners". Additionally, the MFA occasionally acts in articulation with other ministries, in specific international contexts, such as the deployment of Portuguese Armed Forces in the framework of the international missions in which Portugal takes part.

All matters regarding the MFA's external action in the area of Development Cooperation, or the promotion of the Portuguese language and culture are within the scope of Camões – Instituto da Cooperação e da Língua, I. P., which acts under the oversight and tutelage of the Minister of Foreign Affairs.

Besides its External Network, the MFA has central services operating from the Palácio das Necessidades in Lisbon, whose function is to define Portugal's external policy in the bilateral and multilateral fields, in European affairs and in consular issues (including offices in Lisbon and in Porto established to assist and legally recognize documents to Portuguese citizens living abroad). The MFA's central services are also in charge of managing human resources and State Property.

== Organisation ==
The Ministry of Foreign Affairs has competences over the following integrated services in the direct administration of the State, integrated organisms under indirect administration of the State, advisory bodies and other structures:

=== Central Services ===
- General Secretariat;
  - Direction of the Cipher and IT services
  - International Relations Fund, IP
  - UNESCO National Commission
  - State Protocol;
  - General Department of Administration;
  - Department of Legal Affairs;
  - Diplomatic Institute;
- General Directorate for Foreign Policy;
  - Interministerial Committee of Foreign Policy;
- Diplomatic and Consular General-Inspection;
- Secretary of State for Foreign Affairs and Cooperation
  - National Commission for Human Rights
- Camões – Instituto da Cooperação e da Língua, I. P.;
  - Interministerial Committee for Cooperation
    - Advisory Council for the Portuguese Language and Culture
- Development Cooperation Forum
- Secretary of State for Portuguese Communities
  - General Directorate for Consular Affairs and Portuguese Communities;
    - Council of the Portuguese Communities
- Secretary of State for Internationalization
  - Agency for Trade and Investment of Portugal, EPE

=== External peripheral services ===
- Embassies;
- Missions and permanent representations and temporary missions;
- Consular posts;

== List of Foreign Affairs' office holders ==
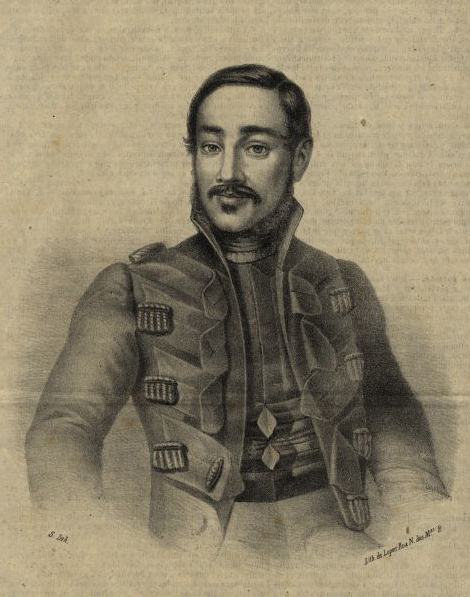
Luís Mouzinho de Albuquerque

The history of the Minister of Foreign Affairs position dates to 15 March 1830, with the establishment of the liberal Regency in Terceira Island, in the context of the Liberal Wars. In that same date Luís Mouzinho de Albuquerque was nominated as Minister and Secretary of State of Foreign Affairs. Currently, the position is occupied by Paulo Rangel, as Minister of State and of Foreign Affairs.

== Headquarters ==
The Ministry of Foreign Affairs is currently headquartered at the Necessidades Palace. The palace has hosted the ministry since May 1952, when it was transferred from its previous location, at the Terreiro do Paço, where it had been located since 1926. The Palace is composed by an architectural complex which includes a church, a convent and a royal palace, built between 1743 and 1752. This palace is an example of the joanine baroque architecture, with a visible Italian influence which characterized the architectural production under royal patronage, during the joanine period. The Palace has a complex blueprint, which is the natural consequence of the articulation of the distinct bodies which form the palace, and is spread around two square patios.

The Palace, located in Largo do Rilvas, in the parish of Estrela (Prazeres), in Lisbon, has a long and rich history, having been, in different moments of its history, a small chapel, a convent, a palace used to host foreign dignitaries, the Royal Residence and a National Republican Guard Barracks, before eventually being occupied by the Ministry of Foreign Affairs, which remains in the Palace to this day.

The role of the palace as the Royal Residence, mainly during the 19th century, and the early 20th century, meant that the palace witnessed several key historic events of the Portuguese Constitutional Monarchy, from the meeting of the Constituent Cortes in 1820, which led to the approval of the first Portuguese Constitution, to the events of the 5 October 1910, when the Monarchy was overthrown, and the Palace was briefly bombarded by troops supporting the republican cause. Throughout this period, several works of art were gathered by the Portuguese Royal Family in the palace, several of which were taken by the King Manuel II to his exile, while a significant number of the remaining collections were transferred to the museums of the Palácio da Ajuda and the Palácio da Pena.

In fact, the historical significance of the palace contributes to grant this monument a unique character with an undeniable value to Portugal, constituting the Palace a unique reference, perfectly suited to the functions of external representation, which are inherent to the Ministry of Foreign Affairs. Indeed, the relevance of the Palace to Portuguese Foreign Policy is evidenced by the fact that the Ministry of Foreign Affairs is often referred simply as "Necessidades", a term that is also occasionally used to refer to the Portuguese Foreign Policy, in general.

== Diplomatic missions ==
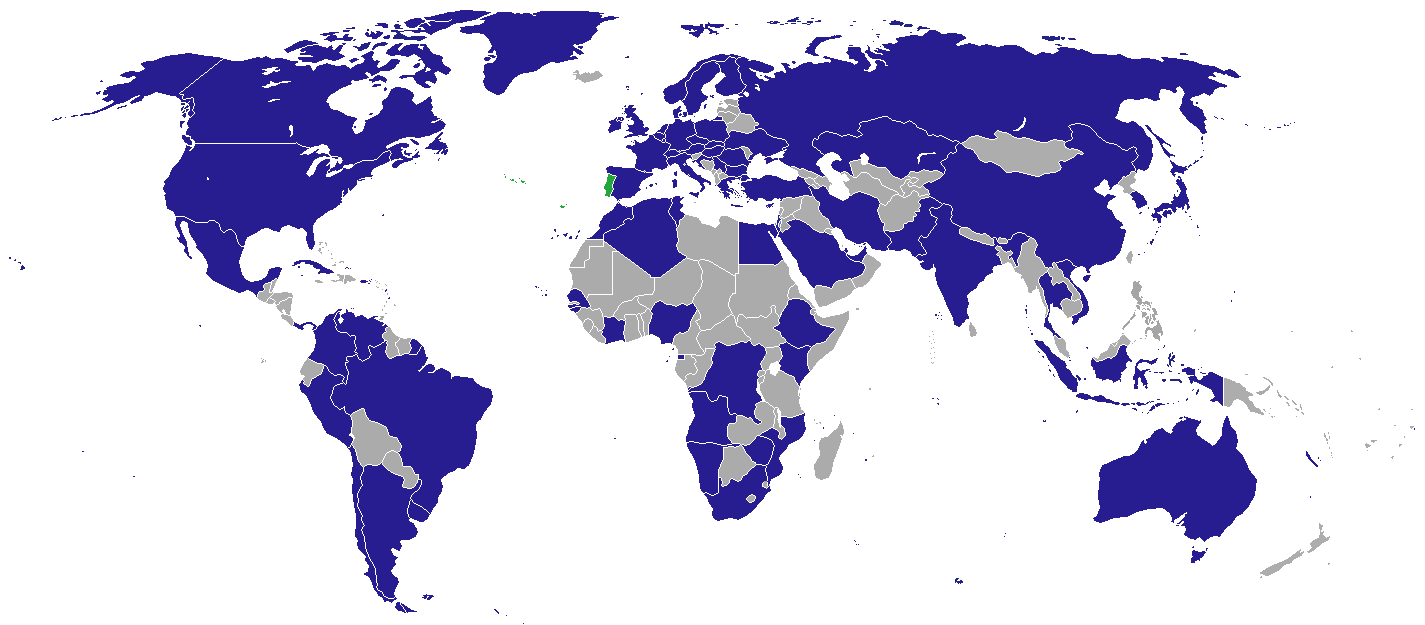
Portuguese Embassy Map

The diplomatic network of Portugal consists of 133 diplomatic missions, which are divided between 76 embassies, 48 consulates, and 9 permanent representations or permanent missions. This does not include consular sections that operate within embassies. From all embassies, 29 are located in Europe, 18 in Africa, 16 in Asia, 12 in America and 1 in Oceania. Portugal also has 216 honorary consulates, of which 82 are in America (26 in Brazil alone), 68 in Europe, 40 in Asia, 31 in Africa and 5 in Oceania.

== See also ==
- List of ministers of foreign affairs (Portugal)
