= Dalila Rodrigues =

Portuguese art historian and politician (born 1961)

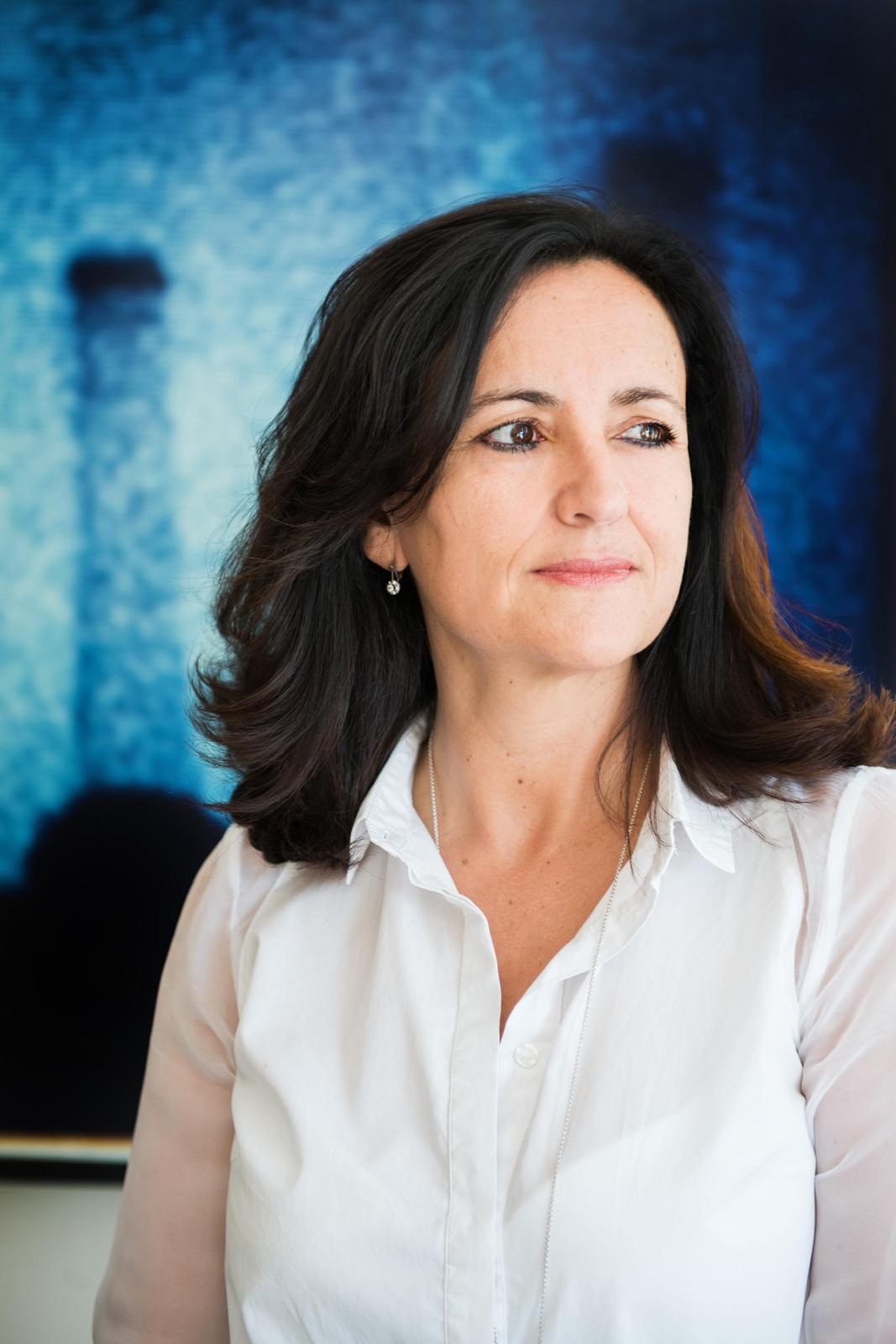
- Dalila Rodrigues in 2018

Minister of Culture
- In office 2 April 2024 – 5 June 2025
- Prime Minister: Luís Montenegro
- Preceded by: Pedro Adão e Silva
- Succeeded by: Margarida Balseiro Lopes (as Minister of Culture, Youth and Sports)

Director of the Jerónimos Monastery and the Belém Tower
- In office 13 May 2019 – 1 April 2024

Member of the Board of Directors of the Belém Cultural Center
- In office 2012–2015

Director of the Casa das Histórias Paula Rego
- In office 2008–2009

Director of the National Museum of Ancient Art
- In office 2004–2007

Director of the Grão Vasco National Museum
- In office 2001–2004

Personal details
- Born: Maria Dalila Aguiar Rodrigues; 15 August 1961 (age 65) Penedono, Portugal
- Party: Independent
- Education: University of Coimbra
- Occupation: Art historian • Politician

Maria Dalila Aguiar Rodrigues (born 15 August 1961) is a Portuguese art historian and politician who has been serving as Minister of Culture in the government of Prime Minister Luís Montenegro since 2024.

== Career ==
With a PhD in Art History from the University of Coimbra, Rodrigues was director of the Grão Vasco Museum, a position she held between 2001 and 2004, and which she left to direct the National Museum of Ancient Art (2004–2007), for which she was appointed by the minister of Culture of the Government of Pedro Santana Lopes, Maria João Bustorff.

Between 2012 and 2015 Rodrigues was a member of the Board of Directors of the Belém Cultural Center Foundation (CCB) and of the Modern and Contemporary Art Foundation – Museu Colecção Berardo. Between 2019 and 2024, Dalila Rodrigues was director of the Jerónimos Monastery and the Belém Tower, two of the most visited monuments in Portugal.

She was a coordinating professor at the Higher School of Education at the Polytechnic Institute of Viseu and a guest professor at the College of Arts at the University of Coimbra. She is also the author of several books and scientific articles in the areas of art history, heritage and museology.
