= XVI Constitutional Government of Portugal =

Cabinet of Portugal between 2004 and 2005, led by Pedro Santana Lopes

- Cabinet of Portugal

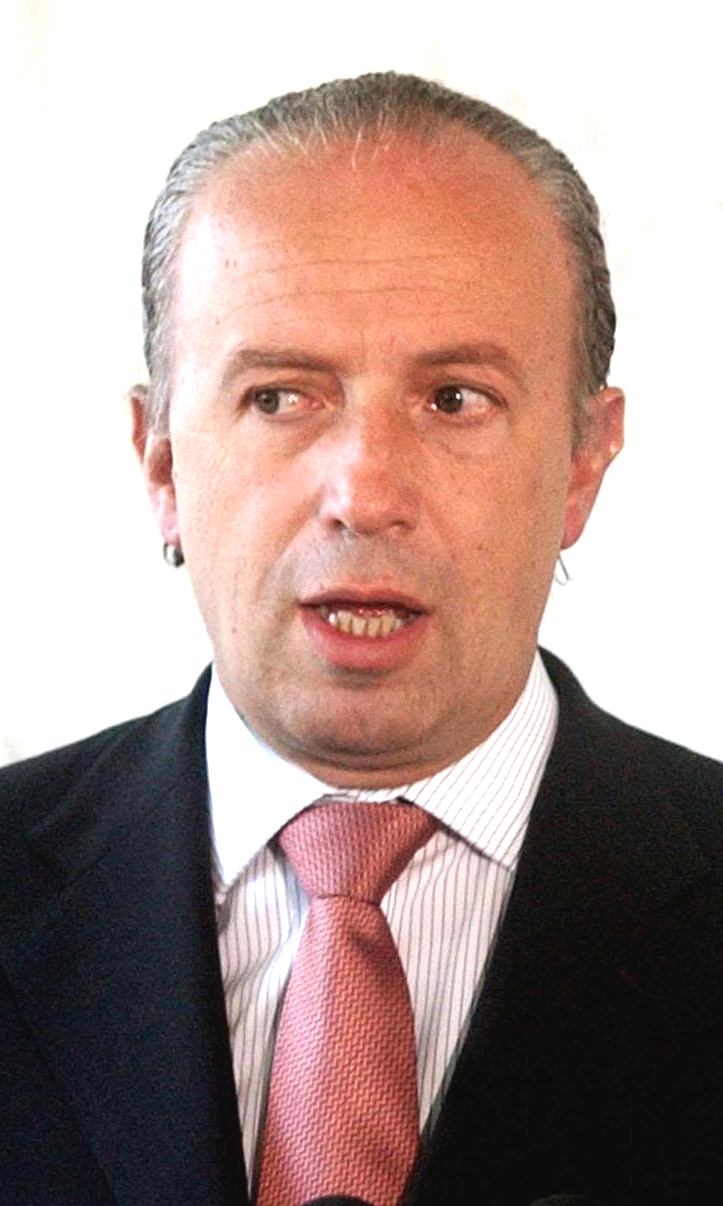
- Prime Minister Pedro Santana Lopes
- Date formed: 17 July 2004
- Date dissolved: 12 March 2005

People and organisations
- President of the Republic: Jorge Sampaio
- Prime Minister: Pedro Santana Lopes
- Member parties: Social Democratic Party (PSD); CDS – People's Party (CDS–PP)
- Status in legislature: Majority coalition government
- Opposition parties: Socialist Party (PS); Portuguese Communist Party (PCP); Left Bloc (BE); Ecologist Party "The Greens" (PEV)

History
- Predecessor: XV Constitutional Government of Portugal
- Successor: XVII Constitutional Government of Portugal

The XVI Constitutional Government of Portugal (Portuguese: XVI Governo Constitucional de Portugal) was the 16th government of the Third Portuguese Republic, under the Portuguese Constitution of 1976. It was in office from 17 July 2004 to 12 March 2005, and was formed by the centre-right coalition between the Social Democratic Party (PSD) and the CDS – People's Party (CDS–PP) that was started in the previous government. Pedro Santana Lopes, leader of the PSD, served as Prime Minister.

== Party breakdown ==
Party breakdown of cabinet ministers by the end of the government's time in office: (Prime Minister not included)

- Social Democratic Party
9
- CDS – People's Party
3
- Independents
6

== Composition ==
The government was composed of the Prime Minister and 19 ministries comprising ministers, secretaries and under-secretaries of state.

Ministers of the XVI Constitutional Government of Portugal
Office	Minister	Party	Start of term	End of term
Prime Minister	Pedro Santana Lopes	PSD	17 July 2004	12 March 2005
Minister of State, Economic Activities and Labour	Álvaro Barreto	PSD	17 July 2004	12 March 2005
Minister of State, National Defense and Sea Affairs	Paulo Portas	CDS–PP	17 July 2004	12 March 2005
Minister of State and Presidency	Nuno Morais Sarmento	PSD	17 July 2004	12 March 2005
Minister of Finance and Public Administration	António Bagão Félix	Independent	17 July 2004	12 March 2005
Minister of Foreign Affairs and Portuguese Communities	António Monteiro	Independent	17 July 2004	12 March 2005
Minister of Internal Administration	Daniel Sanches	Independent	17 July 2004	12 March 2005
Minister of Justice	José Pedro Aguiar-Branco	PSD	17 July 2004	12 March 2005
Minister of Cities, Local Administration, Housing and Regional Development	José Luís Arnaut	PSD	17 July 2004	12 March 2005
Minister of Agriculture, Fisheries and Forests	Carlos Costa Neves	PSD	17 July 2004	12 March 2005
Minister of Education	Maria do Carmo Seabra	Independent	17 July 2004	12 March 2005
Minister of Science and Higher Education	Graça Carvalho	PSD	17 July 2004	12 March 2005
Minister of Health	Luís Filipe Pereira	PSD	17 July 2004	12 March 2005
Minister of Social Security, Family and Children	Fernando Negrão	PSD	17 July 2004	12 March 2005
Minister of Public Works, Transportation and Communications	António Mexia	Independent	17 July 2004	12 March 2005
Minister of Culture	Maria João Bustorff	Independent	17 July 2004	12 March 2005
Minister of the Environment and Territorial Planning	Luís Nobre Guedes	CDS–PP	17 July 2004	12 March 2005
Minister of Tourism	Telmo Correia	CDS–PP	17 July 2004	12 March 2005
Minister of Youth, Sports and Rehabilitation	Henrique Chaves	PSD	24 November 2004	2 December 2004
Assistant Minister to the Prime Minister (Ministro Adjunto do Primeiro-Ministro)	Henrique Chaves	PSD	17 July 2004	24 November 2004
Assistant Minister to the Prime Minister (Ministro Adjunto do Primeiro-Ministro)	Rui Gomes da Silva	PSD	24 November 2004	12 March 2005
Minister of Parliamentary Affairs	Rui Gomes da Silva	PSD	17 July 2004	24 November 2004
