= Isserman =

Issserman is a surname. Notable people with the surname include:

- Abraham J. Isserman (1900–1988), American lawyer and activist
- David Isserman (born 1983), American entrepreneur and conservationist
- Maurice Isserman (born 1951), American historian
