= List of LGBTQ politicians in Portugal =

The following is a list of individuals who have been elected to a political office in Portugal, who fall under the umbrella of LGBT identities, including gay, lesbian, bisexual and/or transgender individuals

== Government ministers ==
Portrait	Name	Office	Years in office	Sexual orientation/ gender identity	Notes	Ref.
	Carlos Lobo de Ávila (1860–1895)	Minister of Public Works, Commerce and Industry	1883–1894	Gay	First gay government minister	
	Carlos Lobo de Ávila (1860–1895)	Minister of Foreign Affairs	1894–1895	Gay	First gay government minister	
	Adolfo Mesquita Nunes (born 1977)	Secretary of State for Tourism	2013–2015	Gay	Outed in 2018	
	Graça Fonseca (born 1971)	Secretary of State of Administrative Modernisation	2015–2018	Lesbian	Outed in 2017	
	Graça Fonseca (born 1971)	Minister of Culture	2018–2022	Lesbian	Outed in 2017	
	Paulo Rangel (born 1968)	Minister of State and Foreign Affairs	2024–present	Gay	Outed in 2021	

== National parliament ==
Portrait	Name	Office	Years in office	Sexual orientation/ gender identity	Notes	Ref.
	Carlos Lobo de Ávila (1860–1895)	Member of the Cortes	1878–1895	Gay	First gay parliamentary member	
	Paulo Rangel (born 1968)	Member of the Assembly of the Republic	2005–2009	Gay	First gay politician elected to the Assembly of the Republic; outed in 2021	
	Miguel Vale de Almeida (born 1960)	Member of the Assembly of the Republic	2009–2011	Gay	First openly gay politician elected to the Assembly of the Republic	
	Mariana Mortágua (born 1986)	Member of the Assembly of the Republic	2013–present	Lesbian	First lesbian member of the Assembly of the Republic	
	Adolfo Mesquita Nunes (born 1977)	Member of the Assembly of the Republic	2011–2013	Gay	Outed in 2018	
	Sandra Cunha (born 1972)	Member of the Assembly of the Republic	2015–2021	Lesbian		
	Alexandre Quintanilha (born 1945)	Member of the Assembly of the Republic	2015–2024	Gay		

== European Parliament ==
Portrait	Name	Office	Years in office	Sexual orientation/ gender identity	Notes	Ref.
	Paulo Rangel (born 1968)	Member of the European Parliament for Portugal	2009–2024	Gay	First gay member of the European Parliament representing Portugal; outed in 2021	

== Sub-national level ==
=== Municipal councils and government ===
Portrait	Name	Council	Years in office	Sexual orientation/ gender identity	Notes	Ref.
	José de Meneses da Silveira e Castro (1826–1895)	Civil Governor of Braga	1870, 1877–1878, 1884–1886	Gay or bisexual	First gay or bisexual appointed government official; outed in 1881	
	José de Meneses da Silveira e Castro (1826–1895)	Deputy Civil Governor of Lisbon	1881	Gay or bisexual	First gay or bisexual appointed government official; outed in 1881	
	Adolfo Mesquita Nunes (born 1977)	Member of the Lisbon City Council	2002–2003	Gay	Outed in 2018	
	Graça Fonseca (born 1971)	Member of the Lisbon City Council	2009–2015	Lesbian	Outed in 2017	
