= Vitorino (name) =

Vitorino is a Portuguese surname and given name. Notable people with the name include:

== Given name ==
- Vitorino (born 1942), mononymous name of Portuguese singer-songwriter Vitorino Salomé Vieira
- Vitorino Antunes (born 1987), Portuguese footballer
- Vitorino de Brito Freire (1908–1977), Brazilian politician
- Vitorino Hilton (born 1977), Brazilian footballer
- Vitorino Magalhães Godinho (1918–2011), Portuguese historian
- Vitorino Nemésio (1901–1978), Portuguese author and poet
- Vitorino Silva (born 1971), Portuguese television personality and politician

== Surname ==
- Ana Paula Vitorino (born 1962), Portuguese politician
- António Vitorino (born 1957), Portuguese politician
- Leonardo Vitorino (born 1973), Brazilian footballer
- Manuel Vitorino (1853–1902), Brazilian politician
