= Piano Quintet in D minor (Bomtempo) =

The Piano Quintet in D minor, B74, for piano, two violins, viola and cello, is a chamber work by Portuguese composer João Domingos Bomtempo. A performance takes about 20 minutes.

== History ==
Although he composed some ten works for piano quintet, the Quintet in E♭ major, Op.16 remained the only published piece of this genre by Bomtempo. The only manuscript of the Quintet in D minor, B74 is preserved in the Biblioteca Nacional de Portugal (P-Ln C.I.C. 39). It is inscribed thus: "Trois Quintetti pour forte piano, deux violons, alto et violoncelle", but contains only this one work. The manuscript is damaged and incomplete, missing the piano part in many places (as it happens in Bomtempo's manuscripts: he presumably improvised some passages instead of playing them from the score), especially in the middle section.

The composition date of the quintet is unknown. It was reconstructed by Portuguese composer Filipe Pires (1934–2015) and received its first contemporary performance in 1992, on the 150th anniversary of Bomtempo's death. The musicians were Gabriela Canavilhas and the Lisbon String Quartet.

Like his other quintets, Bomtempo arranged this one for piano sextet (with double bass), of which version only one sheet survived (the first movement of the double bass part; P-Ln C.I.C. 50).

== Structure ==
The quintet is in three movements, united by musical themes and proceeding without pauses (attacca):

1. Largo — Allegro (D minor)
2. Andante (G major)
3. Allegro (D minor — D major)

After the Largo introduction (D minor) with an important figure in the bass, the gloomy serious principal theme (also D minor) of the sonata Allegro is stated. It is followed by an even more intense section, which leads to the secondary theme (F major). The development section (beginning in F major) is the longest part of the quintet and is made up of several episodes of different character and in different keys. At the end, some chords introduce the next movement.

The central Andante (G major) is a three-part structure. While the piano is almost silent in the opening section, it has a prominent role in the middle (G minor). The closing section is a slightly altered variation of the opening with some piano passages added. It is followed by a portion of music transitioning to the finale.

The last movement, Allegro, is actually the continuation (reprise and coda) of the first: the introduction is omitted, and the music begins right with the main theme (D minor), then goes on to the secondary theme (D major). Both are significantly shortened (it may sound more reminiscent of the opening movement than like a proper reprise); the composer proceeds to the D major coda, which closes the work.

== Recordings ==
- (rec. 2002) Gabriela Canavilhas — piano, António Anjos — violin I, Bin Chau — violin II, Massimo Mazzeo — viola, Varoujan Bartikian — cello / João Domingos Bomtempo. Quintetos com piano. MOVIEPLAY, 2003. MOV 3-11055
