= David Isserman =

American entrepreneur and conservationist (born 1983)

- Isserman in 2024
- Born: March 31, 1983 (age 43)
- Education: Indiana University (BS); Columbia Business School (MBA)
- Occupations: Entrepreneur, conservationist
- Organization: Isserman Ventures (founder)
- Known for: Co-founding RareShare; DinoDawn Expedition; The Explorers Club board of directors
- Spouse: Anna Berger (m. 2014)
- Awards: Knight, Order of Saint Michael of the Wing (2023)

David Isserman (born March 31, 1983) is an American entrepreneur and conservationist living in Lisbon, Portugal. He is the founder of Isserman Ventures, which describes itself as building and operating subscription consumer brands.

Isserman co-founded RareShare, an online platform for rare disease communities, in 2008, and founded Venin Royale, a skincare company in Boulder, Colorado, in 2013.

From 2020 to 2026, he served on the board of directors of The Explorers Club, and he helped form the club's Portugal Chapter. In 2024, he carried an Explorers Club flag on an expedition that reintroduced endangered Sorraia horses to Portugal's Alentejo region, and he leads the PaleoDiscovery Team on the DinoDawn paleontological expedition in the Algarve, a Triassic dig he runs with paleontologist Ricardo Araújo. In 2023, Duarte Pio, Duke of Braganza made him a Knight of the Order of Saint Michael of the Wing.

== Early life and education ==
Isserman grew up in Clayton, Missouri, and graduated from Clayton High School in 2001. He began building websites for small businesses in middle school and had about 75 clients by high school. At age 14, he approached A.G. Edwards to offer technology consulting services; Alfred Goldman, a corporate vice president at the firm's brokerage subsidiary, later nominated him for the St. Louis Business Journal's 30 Under 30 list, to which he was named in 2006. He earned a Bachelor of Science from Indiana University and an MBA from Columbia Business School.

== Career ==
=== Early ventures ===
While at Indiana University, Isserman founded Isserman Consulting LLC, a communications and web strategy firm in Clayton. In 2006, television host Richard Wiese hired the firm to build his web presence, including a site for Wiese's nationally syndicated show Exploration with Richard Wiese.

=== RareShare ===
In 2008, while attending Columbia Business School, Isserman co-founded RareShare with Eric Steele. The platform connected people affected by rare diseases with one another and with medical professionals. RareShare won the social venture category at the 2008 Pace Pitch Contest hosted by Pace University's Lubin School of Business. In December 2008, TechCrunch reported that the platform had more than 700 communities for different disorders and that, according to RareShare, it had been collaborating with the National Institutes of Health and the Canadian Organization for Rare Disorders. The Washington Post covered the platform in February 2009, and the Toronto Star reported that it hosted discussion groups for hundreds of conditions. RareShare grew to more than 850 communities before Isserman exited in 2014. RareShare is now operated by the Rare Genomics Institute, which describes it as having more than 1,000 disease communities. The platform has been cited in the academic literature on rare-disease drug discovery.

=== Venin Royale ===
In 2013, Isserman founded Venin Royale, a skincare company in Boulder, Colorado, that used king cobra venom peptides in its products. The products were developed with neuroscientist Paul Reid. The line was sold through physician offices, medical spas, and specialty retailers.

=== Isserman Ventures ===
Isserman is the founder of Isserman Ventures, which describes itself as building and operating subscription consumer brands, with a focus on customer acquisition, operations and retention. Town and Style reported in 2023 that the firm also makes angel investments in scientists and entrepreneurs and provides microgrants to local conservation efforts.

== Exploration and conservation ==
Isserman is a graduate of the National Outdoor Leadership School. He joined The Explorers Club in 2002 and is a life member. From March 2020 to April 2026, he served on the club's board of directors. He chaired the club's annual dinner (ECAD) and co-chaired its Conservation and Sustainability Committee. After the club's 2023 Global Exploration Summit (GLEX) in the Azores, Isserman, a Portugal-resident board member, worked with founding chair Paul Neil to lead the formation of the club's Portugal Chapter. He serves on the Portugal Chapter's board. The club's November 2025 announcement of its mobile app thanked him for guidance in modernizing its data infrastructure and digital footprint.

In November 2024, Isserman carried Explorers Club Flag No. 179 on an expedition to reintroduce endangered Sorraia horses to a former cattle ranch in Vila Viçosa, in the Alentejo. The ranch is the designated site of an elephant sanctuary run by Pangea Trust, a UK-registered charity.

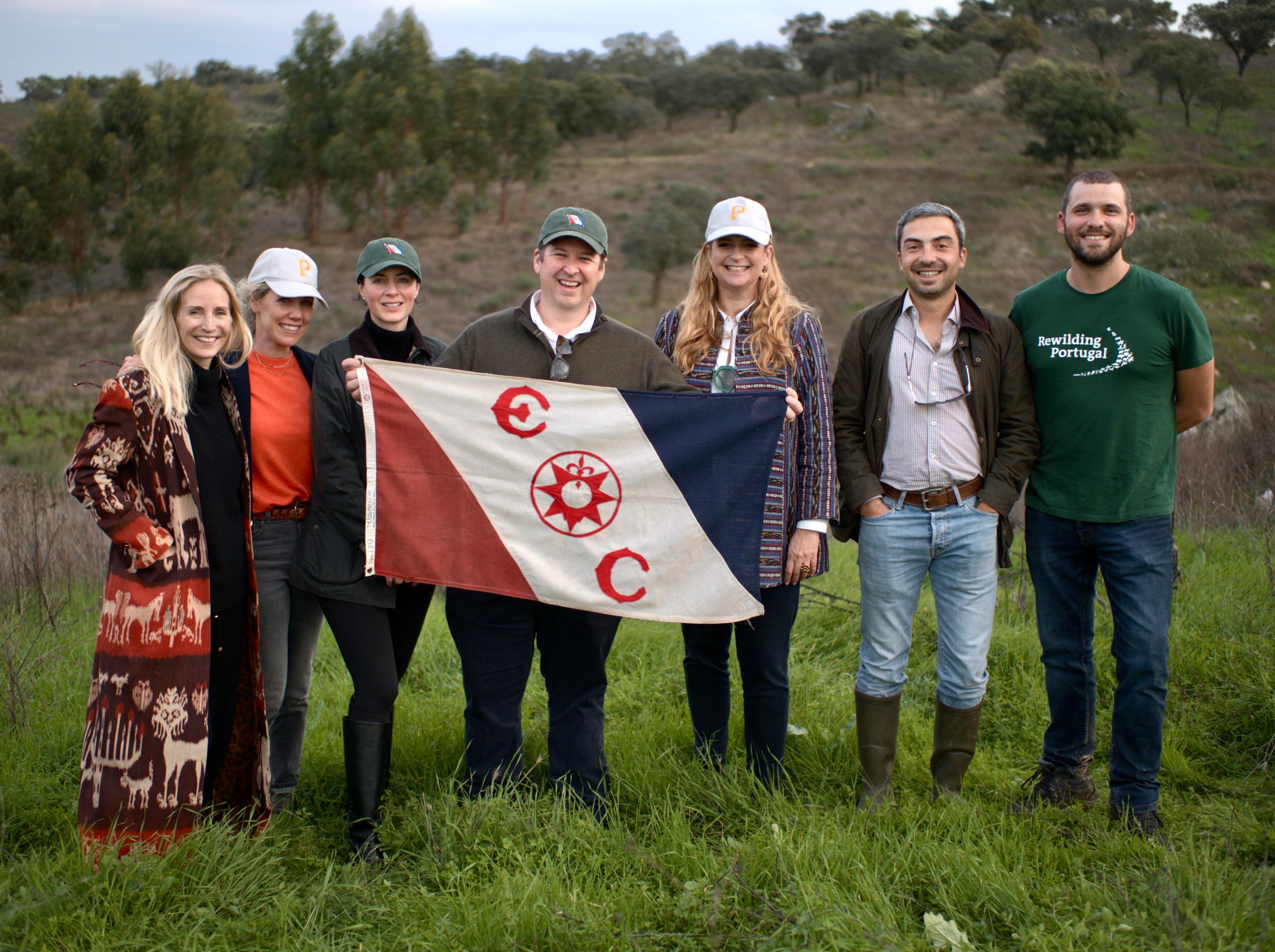
The Explorers Club Flag No. 179 expedition team in Portugal's Alentejo region, 2024. From left: Ruth Ganesh, Kate Moore, Anna Isserman, David Isserman (holding flag), Diana, Duchess of Cadaval, Gonçalo Matos, and José Fontes of Rewilding Portugal.

He returned the flag at the club's ECAD Sunday flag-return ceremony in April 2025.

Isserman leads the PaleoDiscovery Team on the DinoDawn Expedition, an Explorers Club flag-bearing paleontological dig in Portugal's Algarve region that searches Triassic rocks about 230 million years old for the earliest dinosaurs and mammal ancestors. Its scientific research is directed by Ricardo Araújo of the Instituto Superior Técnico, with whom Isserman has worked on field campaigns since 2024; Sul Informação described the two as jointly responsible for the expedition, with Isserman's team handling field operations and logistics. The expedition has carried Explorers Club Flag No. 64. In its third field season, in 2026, the team excavated two sites in the municipality of Loulé, including a bone bed at Fonte Santa, working with the Instituto Superior Técnico, the Sociedade de História Natural of Torres Vedras, The Explorers Club and the municipalities of Loulé and Silves; during the campaign Isserman and team member Dave Finnegan spoke to pupils at schools in Loulé.

== Affiliations and honors ==
Isserman is an advisory trustee of the Academy of Science of St. Louis.

In 2023, Duarte Pio, Duke of Braganza, made Isserman a Knight of the Order of Saint Michael of the Wing, a dynastic order of the non-reigning House of Braganza.

== Personal life ==
Isserman married Anna Berger in June 2014. They moved from the United States to Lisbon, Portugal, in 2022.
