= Margarida Balseiro Lopes =

Portuguese politician (born 1989)

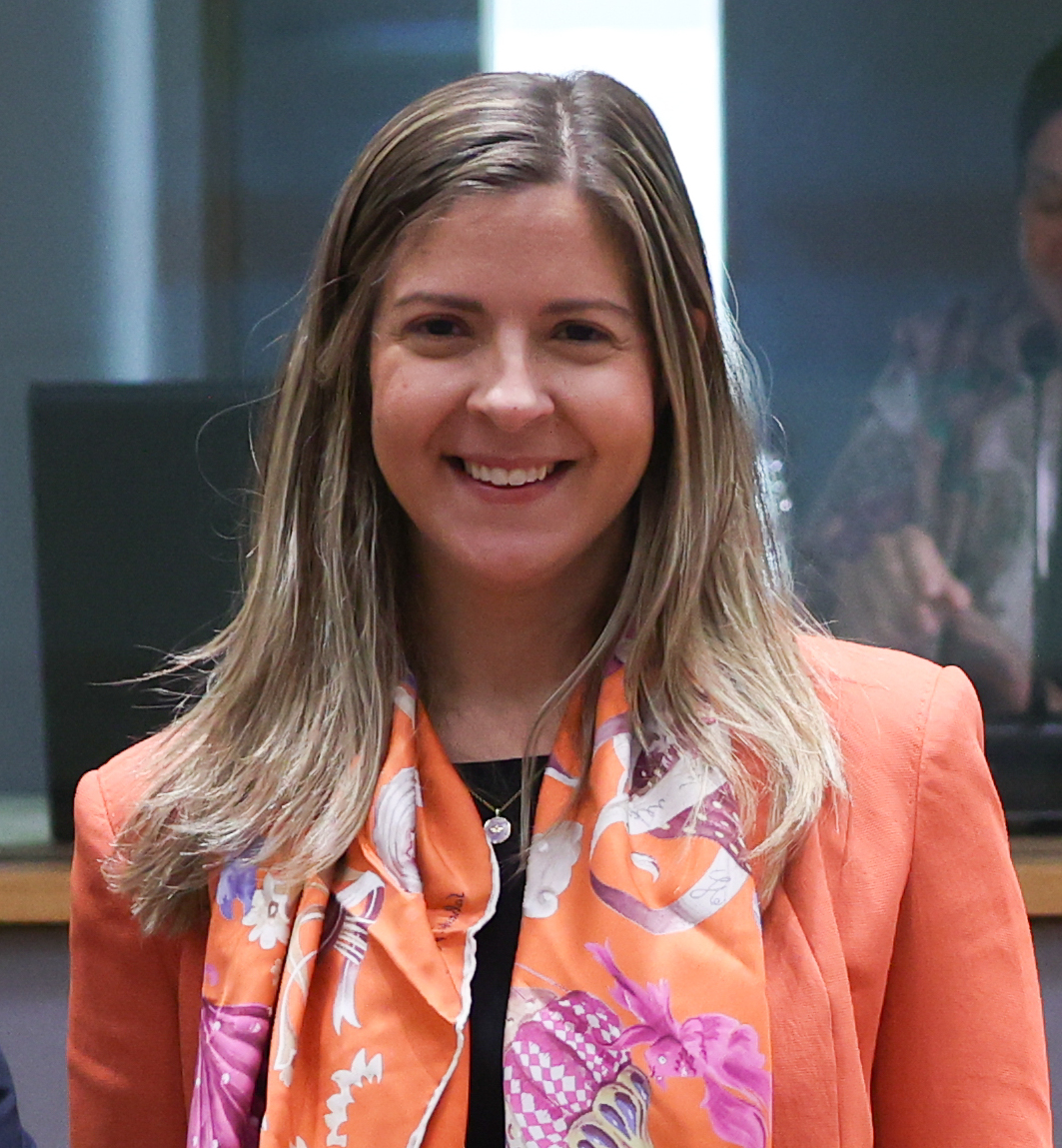
- Balseiro Lopes in 2024

Minister of Culture, Youth and Sports
- Incumbent
- Assumed office 5 June 2025
- Prime Minister: Luís Montenegro
- Preceded by: Dalila Rodrigues (as Minister of Culture); Herself (as Minister of Youth and Modernization)

Minister of Youth and Modernization
- In office 2 April 2024 – 5 June 2025
- Prime Minister: Luís Montenegro
- Preceded by: Office established
- Succeeded by: Herself (as Minister of Culture, Youth and Sports); Gonçalo Saraiva Matias (as Minister Adjunct and for State Reform)

President of the Social Democratic Youth
- In office 15 April 2018 – 26 July 2020
- Preceded by: Simão Ribeiro
- Succeeded by: Alexandre Poço

Vice President of the Social Democratic Party
- In office 3 July 2022 – 19 October 2024
- President: Luís Montenegro
- Preceded by: António Maló de Abreu
- Succeeded by: Lucinda Dâmaso

Member of the Assembly of the Republic
- In office 23 October 2015 – 28 March 2022
- Constituency: Leiria

Member of the Marinha Grande Municipal Assembly
- In office 21 October 2013 – 12 October 2025

Personal details
- Born: Ana Margarida Balseiro de Sousa Lopes; 24 September 1989 (age 37) Marinha Grande, Portugal
- Party: Social Democratic
- Other political affiliations: Social Democratic Youth
- Education: University of Lisbon
- Occupation: Jurist • Politician

Ana Margarida Balseiro de Sousa Lopes (born 24 September 1989) is a Portuguese jurist and politician. She was a member of the Assembly of the Republic of Portugal as a member of the liberal-conservative Social Democratic Party (PSD) and a former president of Social Democratic Youth (JSD), the youth wing of the PSD. Following the 2024 national election she was appointed as Minister of Youth and Modernization by the Prime Minister, Luís Montenegro.

== Early life and politics ==
Margarida Balseiro Lopes was born in Marinha Grande in the Leiria District on 24 September 1989. She has a degree in law from the law faculty of the University of Lisbon, and a master's degree in law and management from the Catholic University of Portugal. She is studying for a doctorate. From her time at school she was active in politics, being president of the students' union. Marinha Grande has a strong left-wing tradition and the youth wing of the liberal-conservative PSD was not functioning there. Lopes was responsible for restarting it. At university she was a student representative on the academic council of the law faculty.

== Political career ==
Beginning her political career in Marinha Grande, Lopes then became active in the JSD in Leiria District. She is also a member of the Marinha Grande Municipal Assembly, since 2013. In 2015 she was elected as a deputy to the Assembly of the Republic on the PSD list for the Leiria constituency and was re-elected in 2019. In 2017 she went to the United States as part of the Department of State's International Visitor Leadership Program. She has served on the Budget and Finance Committee of the parliament and has been an alternate on the Education, Science, Youth and Sport Committee. In April 2018 she was elected president of the JSD nationally, a position she relinquished in 2020. She was not a candidate in the 2022 legislative election.

Lopes has been a regular contributor of articles to national Portuguese newspapers, particularly Correio da Manhã.
