= Luís Filipe Castro Mendes =

Portuguese politician (born 1950)

Luís Filipe Castro Mendes GOIH GCM
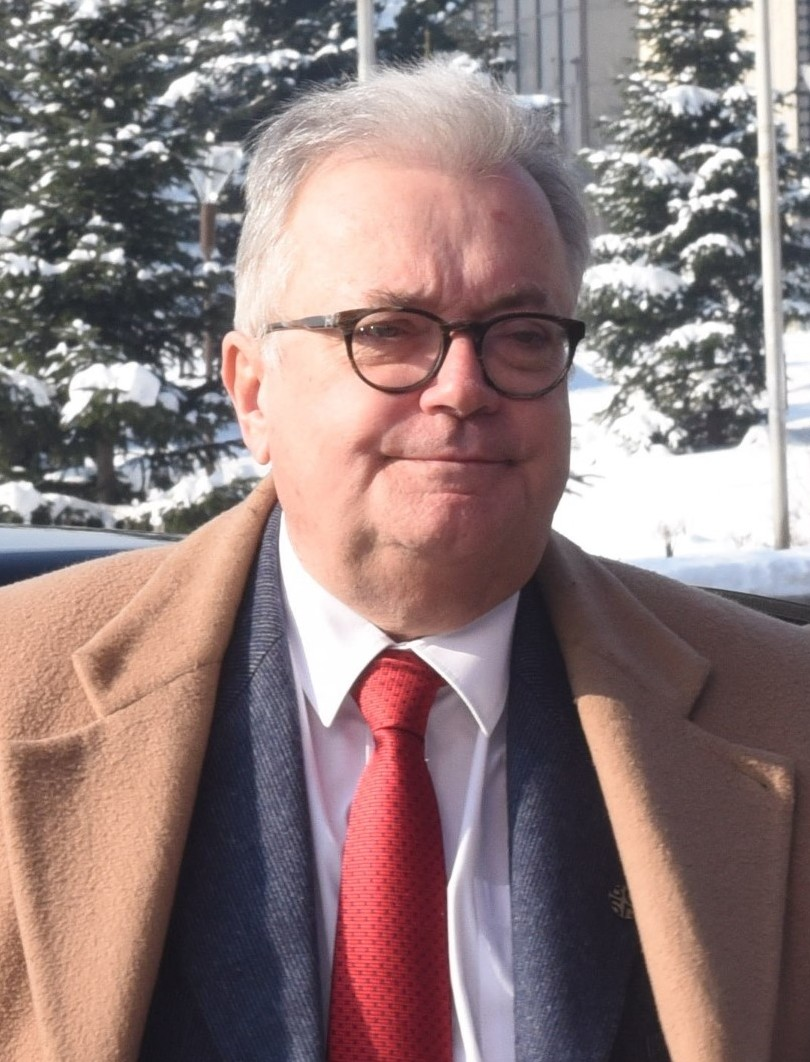

Minister of Culture
- In office 14 April 2016 – 15 October 2018
- Prime Minister: António Costa
- Preceded by: João Soares
- Succeeded by: Graça Fonseca

Personal details
- Born: 1950 (age 75–76) Idanha-a-Nova, Portugal
- Education: University of Lisbon

Luís Filipe de Castro Mendes GOIH GCM (born 21 November 1950) is a Portuguese politician who served as Minister of Culture from 14 April 2016 to 15 October 2018.

== Biography ==
Mendes graduated from the University of Lisbon with a law degree.

He served as the Portuguese ambassador to Budapest from 2003 to 2007, and as the ambassador to New Delhi from 2007 to 2009.

in 2010, he replaces Manuel Maria Carrilho as Permanent delegates of Portugal to UNESCO.

== Distinctions ==
=== National orders ===
- Grand Cross of the Order of Merit (GCM, 28 January 2003)
- Grand Officer of the Order of Prince Henry (GOIH, 18 March 1986)
- Commander of the Order of Merit (ComM, 12 September 1991)

=== Foreign orders ===
- Brazil: Commander of the Order of Rio Branco (25 July 1996)
- United Kingdom: Honorary Commander of the Royal Victorian Order (7 March 1986)
