= Ministry of Culture, Youth and Sports (Portugal) =

Government ministry of Portugal

- Ministério da Cultura, Juventude e Desporto
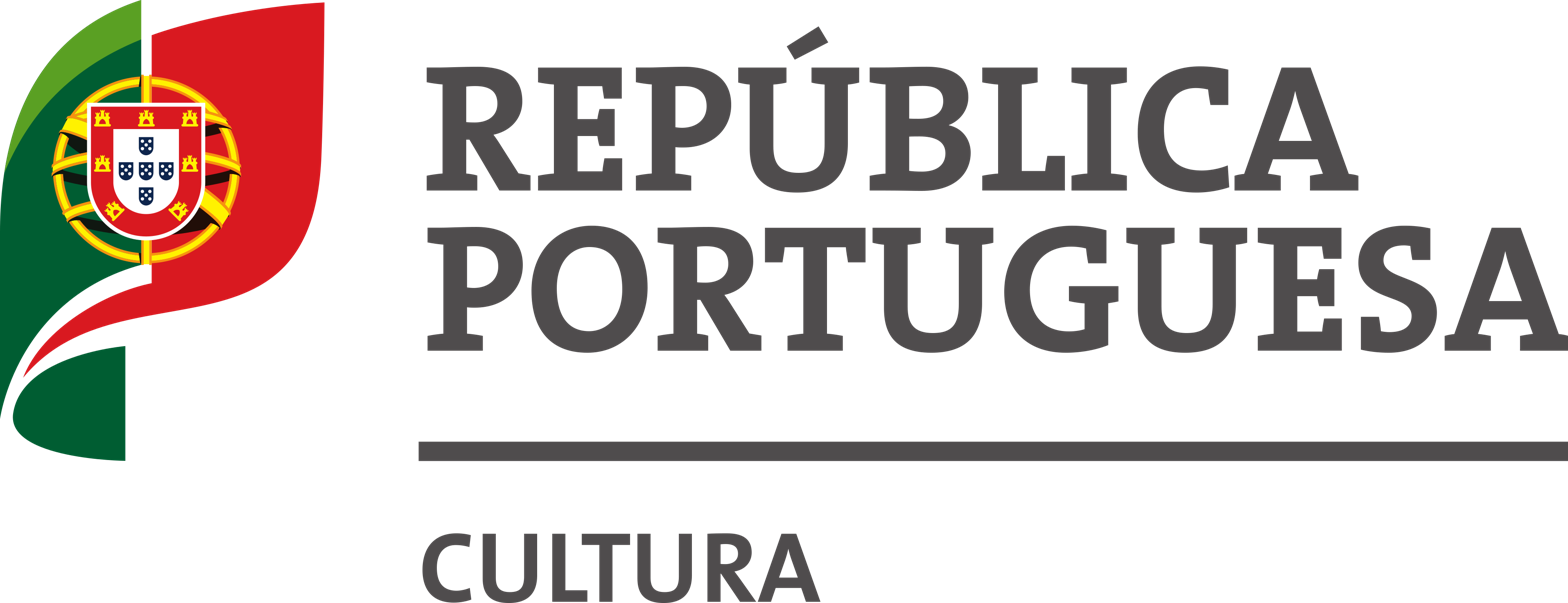

Ministry overview
- Jurisdiction: Government of Portugal
- Headquarters: Campus XXI, Lisbon
- Annual budget: €245.5 million
- Minister responsible: Margarida Balseiro Lopes, Minister of Culture, Youth and Sports
- Child Ministry: Direção-Geral do Património Cultural
- Website: Official Site

The Ministry of Culture, Youth and Sports (Portuguese: Ministério da Cultura, Juventude e Desporto) is a Portuguese government ministry, created in June 2025 by the XXV Constitutional Government as a merger of the previous Ministries of Culture and Youth and Modernisation. Currently, it is led by Margarida Balseiro Lopes.

It is dedicated to the design, development, execution and assessment of the cultural national policy, as well as managing policies related to youth and sports.

As all other ministers, the Minister of Culture, Youth and Sports is part of the Council of Ministers.

== List of ministers ==
#	Portrait	Name	Took office	Left office	Party	Prime Minister
1		Eduardo Silva Correia (1915–1991)	16 May 1974	17 July 1974	Ind.	Adelino da Palma Carlos
2		Vitorino Magalhães Godinho (1918–2011)	17 July 1974	29 November 1974	Ind.	Vasco Gonçalves
3		Vasco Gonçalves (1921–2005)	29 November 1974	4 December 1974	Ind.	Vasco Gonçalves
4		Manuel Rodrigues de Carvalho (1929–1999)	4 December 1974	26 March 1975	Ind.	Vasco Gonçalves
5		José Emílio da Silva (1940–2024)	26 March 1975	19 September 1975	Ind.	Vasco Gonçalves
–	Vacant office As Secretary of State: David Mourão-Ferreira (1975–1978)		19 September 1975	30 January 1978		José Pinheiro de Azevedo
–	Vacant office As Secretary of State: David Mourão-Ferreira (1975–1978)		19 September 1975	30 January 1978		Mário Soares
6		Mário Sottomayor Cardia (1941–2006)	30 January 1978	29 August 1978	PS	Mário Soares
7		Carlos Lloyd Braga (1928–1997)	29 August 1978	22 November 1978	Ind.	Alfredo Nobre da Costa
–	Vacant office As Secretary of State: David Mourão-Ferreira (1978–1979)		22 November 1978	1 August 1979		Carlos Mota Pinto
8		Adérito Sedas Nunes (1928–1991)	1 August 1979	3 January 1980	Ind.	Maria de Lourdes Pintasilgo
–	Vacant office As Secretary of State: António Braz Teixeira (1981)		3 January 1980	4 September 1981		Francisco Sá Carneiro
–	Vacant office As Secretary of State: António Braz Teixeira (1981)		3 January 1980	4 September 1981		Diogo Freitas do Amaral
–	Vacant office As Secretary of State: António Braz Teixeira (1981)		3 January 1980	4 September 1981		Francisco Pinto Balsemão
9		Francisco Lucas Pires (1944–1998)	4 September 1981	9 June 1983	CDS	Francisco Pinto Balsemão
10		António Coimbra Martins (1927–2021)	9 June 1983	6 November 1985	PS	Mário Soares
11		João de Deus Pinheiro (b. 1945)	6 November 1985	17 August 1987	PSD	Aníbal Cavaco Silva
–	Vacant office As Secretary of State: Teresa Gouveia (1987–1990); Pedro Santana Lopes (1990–1994); Manuel Frexes (1994–1995)		17 August 1987	28 October 1995		Aníbal Cavaco Silva
12		Manuel Maria Carrilho (b. 1951)	28 October 1995	12 July 2000	PS	António Guterres
13		José Sasportes (b. 1937)	12 July 2000	3 July 2001	PS	António Guterres
14		Augusto Santos Silva (b. 1956)	3 July 2001	6 April 2002	PS	António Guterres
15		Pedro Roseta (b. 1943)	6 April 2002	17 June 2004	PSD	José Durão Barroso
16		Maria João Bustorff (b. 1950)	17 June 2004	12 March 2005	PSD	Pedro Santana Lopes
17		Isabel Pires de Lima (b. 1950)	12 March 2005	30 January 2008	Ind.	José Sócrates
18		José Pinto Ribeiro (b. 1946)	30 January 2008	26 October 2009	PS	José Sócrates
19		Gabriela Canavilhas (b. 1961)	26 October 2009	21 June 2011	PS	José Sócrates
–	Vacant office As Secretary of State: Francisco José Viegas (2011–2012); Jorge Barreto Xavier (2012–2015)		21 June 2011	30 October 2015		Pedro Passos Coelho
20		Teresa Morais (b. 1959)	30 October 2015	26 November 2015	PSD	Pedro Passos Coelho
21		João Soares (b. 1949)	26 November 2015	14 April 2016	PS	António Costa
22		Luís Filipe Castro Mendes (b. 1950)	14 April 2016	15 October 2018	Ind.	António Costa
23		Graça Fonseca (b. 1971)	15 October 2018	30 March 2022	PS	António Costa
24		Pedro Adão e Silva (b. 1974)	30 March 2022	2 April 2024	PS	António Costa
25		Dalila Rodrigues (b. 1961)	2 April 2024	5 June 2025	Ind.	Luís Montenegro
26		Margarida Balseiro Lopes (b. 1989)	5 June 2025	Incumbent	PSD	Luís Montenegro

=== By time in office ===
Name	Time in office	Duration
Manuel Maria Carrilho	1995–2000	4 years, 258 days
Graça Fonseca	2018–2022	3 years, 166 days
Isabel Pires de Lima	2005–2008	2 years, 324 days
Luís Filipe Castro Mendes	2016–2018	2 years, 184 days
António Coimbra Martins	1983–1985	2 years, 150 days
Pedro Roseta	2002–2004	2 years, 72 days
João de Deus Pinheiro	1985–1987	2 years, 11 days
Pedro Adão e Silva	2022–2024	2 years, 3 days
Francisco Lucas Pires	1981–1983	1 year, 278 days
José Pinto Ribeiro	2008–2009	1 year, 269 days
Gabriela Canavilhas	2009–2011	1 year, 207 days
Margarida Balseiro Lopes	2025–present	1 year, 90 days
Dalila Rodrigues	2024–2025	1 year, 64 days
José Sasportes	2000–2001	356 days
Augusto Santos Silva	2001–2002	277 days
Maria João Bustorff	2004–2005	268 days
Mário Sottomayor Cardia	1978	211 days
José Emílio da Silva	1975	177 days
João Soares	2015–2016	140 days
Vitorino Magalhães Godinho	1974	135 days
Manuel Rodrigues de Carvalho	1974–1975	112 days
Carlos Lloyd Braga	1978	85 days
Eduardo Silva Correia	1974	62 days
Teresa Morais	2015	27 days
Vasco Gonçalves	1974	5 days
