= Zebro =

Unidentified wild or feral equine

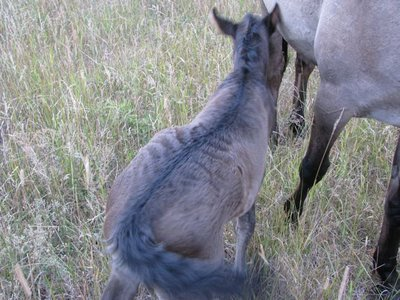
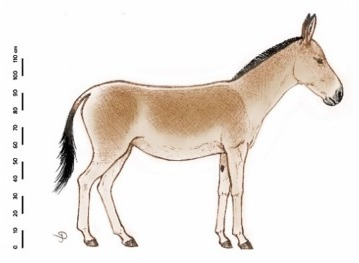
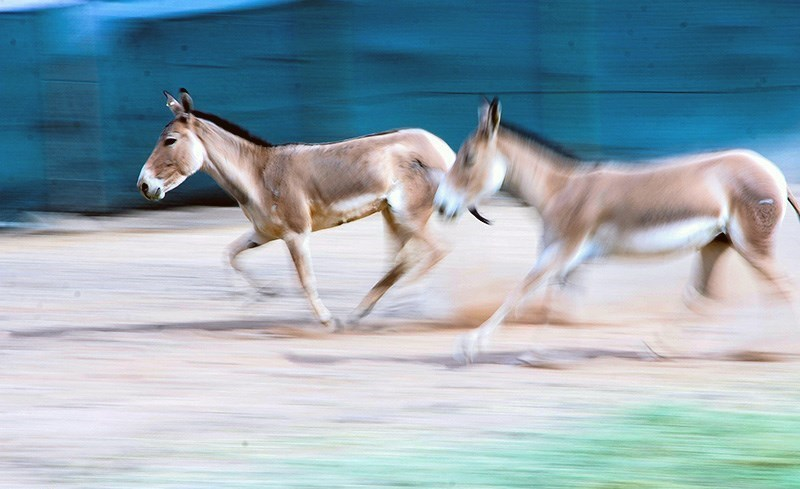
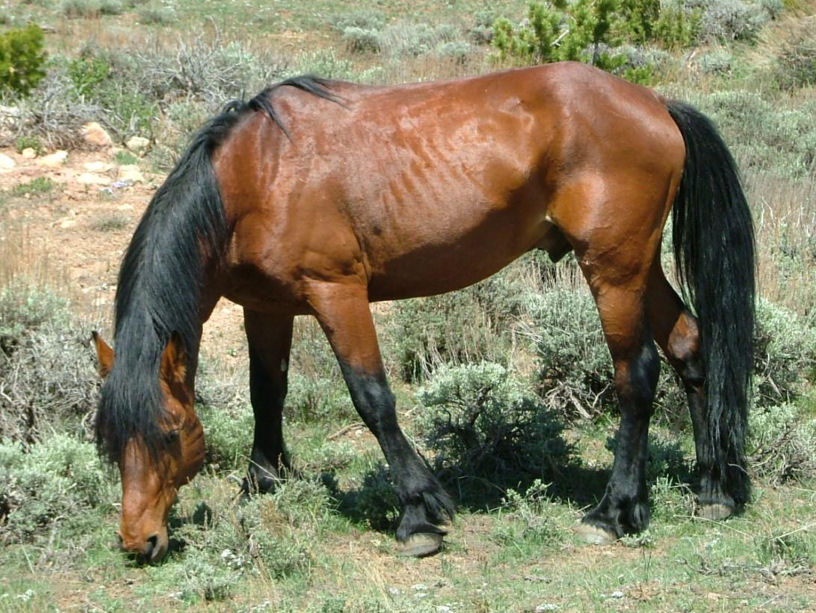
Leading theories for the medieval animals described as zebros. Clockwise from upper left: a native wild horse possibly related to the Sorraia breed, the European wild ass, a feralized horse or donkey, and the Asiatic wild ass.

A zebro was a wild horse or horse-like animal that many medieval authors reported living in the Iberian Peninsula until the 16th century. Medieval sources described it as an ashen-colored animal with a dorsal stripe, smaller than domesticated horses, and difficult to tame. It is not certain if they had stripes on other areas. They were hunted as a game animal during the medieval period. Their hides were used to make shoes and shields. Their meat was described as delicious and reported to cure laziness. The zebro likely went extinct by the 16th century.

Portuguese explorers may have named the African zebra after the zebro. Modern scholars are not certain what species they were. The four leading theories are that the zebro was a native wild horse possibly related to the Sorraia breed, the extinct European wild ass, another name for the Asiatic wild ass, or a feralized equid.

== Etymology ==
The origin of the term zebro is debated, but the most accepted theory is that it comes from the Latin equus ferus ("wild horse"), which evolved into equiferus. The unattested form eciferus was likely used in the Vulgar Latin. In Iberia, this became enzebro or ezebro, later shortened to zebro. Historical Spanish accounts typically spell it with a "c" and "b", as "cebro". The earliest Portuguese accounts use a "z" and "v", spelling it as "zevro". In both languages, it may be prefixed with "e-", "en-", or "a-". Catalan sources use the variation "atzebro". Modern authors typically use zebro or cebro.

The African zebra may be named after this animal. Portuguese explorers used the term zebra for animals they found in present-day South Africa. The striped quagga, an extinct subspecies of zebra, was native to the area. Over time, the name was used for the plains zebra which, unlike the quagga, has a distinct black and white coat.

== Description ==
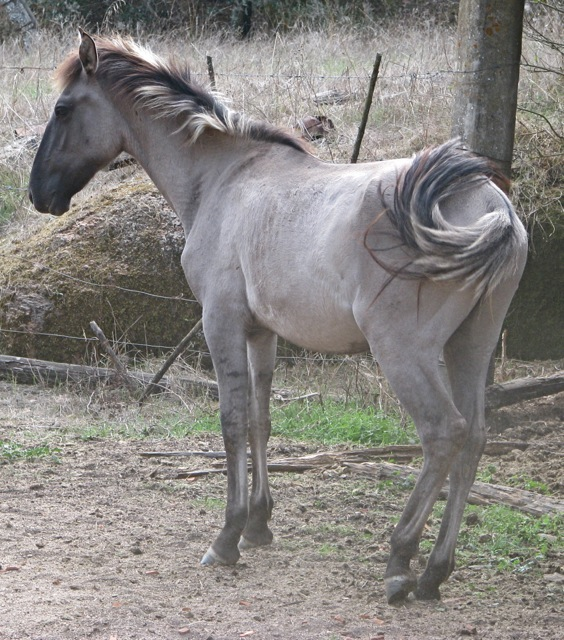
A Sorraia horse

There are many medieval sources that mention the zebro, though few give detailed descriptions. It is often mentioned briefly as a game animal, an agricultural pest, a source of leather, or a source of meat. Before zebros disappeared from the Iberian Peninsula, a medieval hunting treatise described them as delicious.

It can be deduced from surviving accounts that the zebro was a wild equid, smaller than domesticated horses but larger than red deer. They were ashen grey in color with a darker muzzle and dorsal stripe running down their backs. They whinnied like horses, and authors commented on their speed and indomitable nature.

While there is a modern view that zebros had stripes on their legs or other parts of their bodies, Medieval sources only mention the dorsal stripe. Some donkeys and horses, such as the Portuguese Sorraia, do have stripes on their legs, so it is possible that these primitive markings were present on the zebros. Horse leg bars are called cebraduras in Spanish, but that word was coined in the 19th century, long after the last recorded zebro accounts and the discovery of the African plains zebra.

== Distribution ==
The zebro's shrinking range across centuries can be approximated with historical sources, according to Carlos Nores: 12th century and earlier toponym data; 13th century data from fueros & forais; 14th century dated reports; 16th century final reports from Albacete

Medieval sources mention zebros and many place names from at least the ninth century are derived from the term. This indicates a distribution that extended through Portugal, the interior of Galicia and Asturias, the west of the Meseta Norte, all of Extremadura and Meseta Sur, reaching as far as the Region of Murcia and the Province of Alicante.

During the thirteenth century their range was reduced. They disappeared north of the Sistema Central mountains, and the populations elsewhere contracted. The last major Portuguese population was in Algarve, and they had mostly vanished from Portugal by the 13th century. In the fourteenth century, three isolated population centers remained: one in southern Portugal and two in Spain. The last surviving examples lived in the area of Chinchilla (Albacete) before they vanished by the sixteenth century. A 1576 document referred to final Chinchilla zebros in the past tense.

Hunting and persecution by humans caused their dwindling numbers. The zebro was a game animal according to numerous medieval accounts such as the Libro de la Montería by Alfonso XI of Castile. Some sources mention consumption of zebro meat. Among these, some describe the meat as delicious. Others mention it as a potential remedy. A 13th century treatise advises zebro meat for falcons suffering from avian tuberculosis. Historian Lope García de Salazar wrote that zebro meat improved poor eyesight. When the Marquess of Villena wrote a treatise on the evil eye, he said that some people smeared zebro fat into their eyebrows for protection, though he discouraged his readers from doing so. Their leather was used to create shoes and shields. Some later sources mention problems that zebros caused by eating crops, so it is also possible that hunting was done to intentionally reduce the population.

It is possible that the zebros are related to the Sorraia horse. The rare Portuguese Sorraia breed has a coat similar to that reported of zebros. A DNA study found some evidence that the breed could descend directly from European wild horses. However, there is only circumstantial evidence connecting them to the medieval zebro. A small number of the Sorraia survive today, and conservationists have created a refuge in the Vale de Zebro area of Portugal for about one hundred of them, based on the idea that they are the last few descendants of the medieval zebros.

== Accounts ==
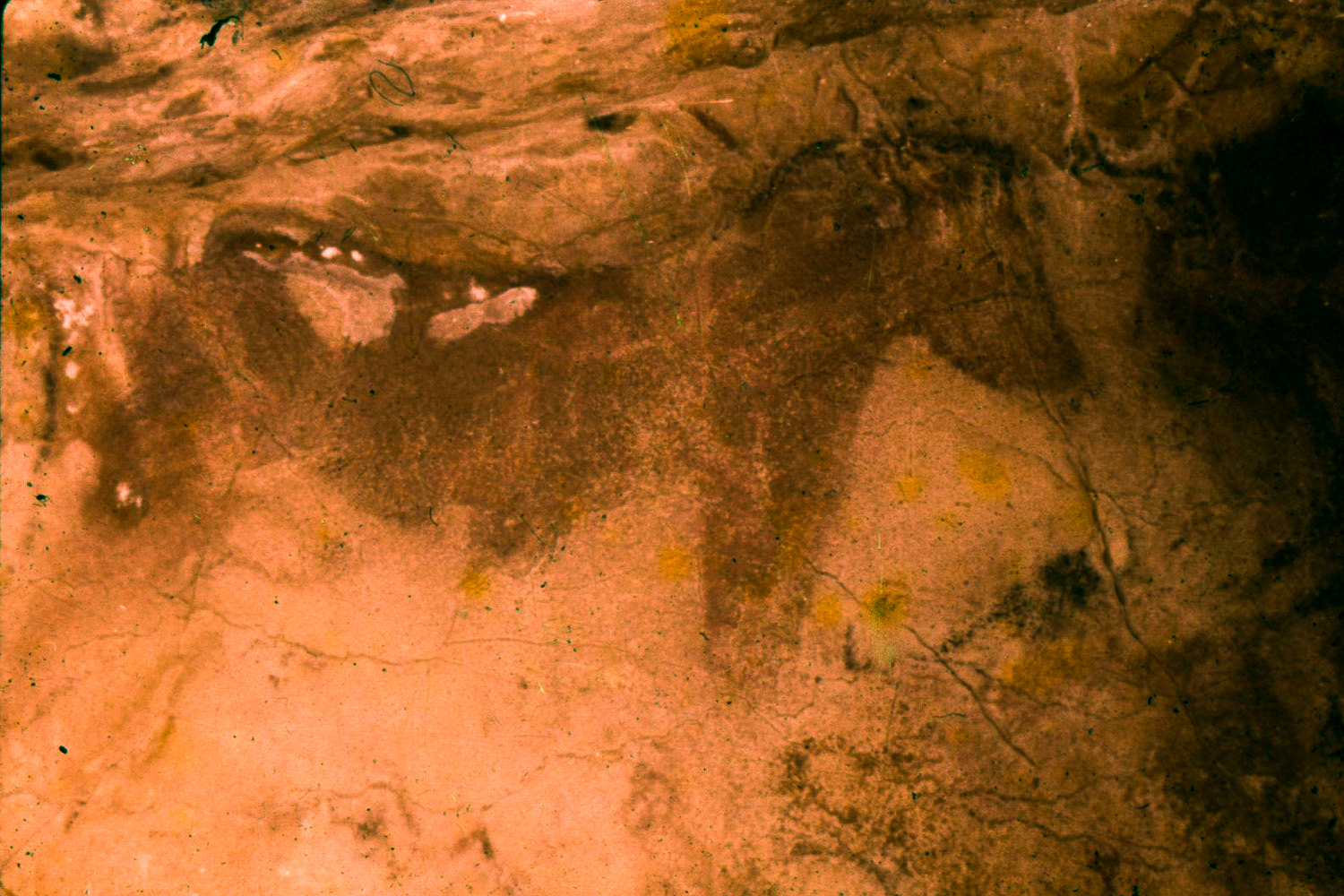
A prehistoric painting of a wild equid from the Cave of Altamira may depict a zebro.

Prehistoric wild equids thrived in the Iberian Peninsula. Early humans depicted them in cave paintings, like those in the Cave of El Castillo and Cave of Altamira. Some show stripes on various parts of their bodies. Ancient authors wrote about Iberian wild horses from the first century AD (Strabo) until the seventh century AD (Isidore of Seville). Classical Greek and Roman authors knew of wild onagers and domesticated donkeys, but referred to these Iberian equids as horses. Writing in Latin, Isidore used the term equiferus.

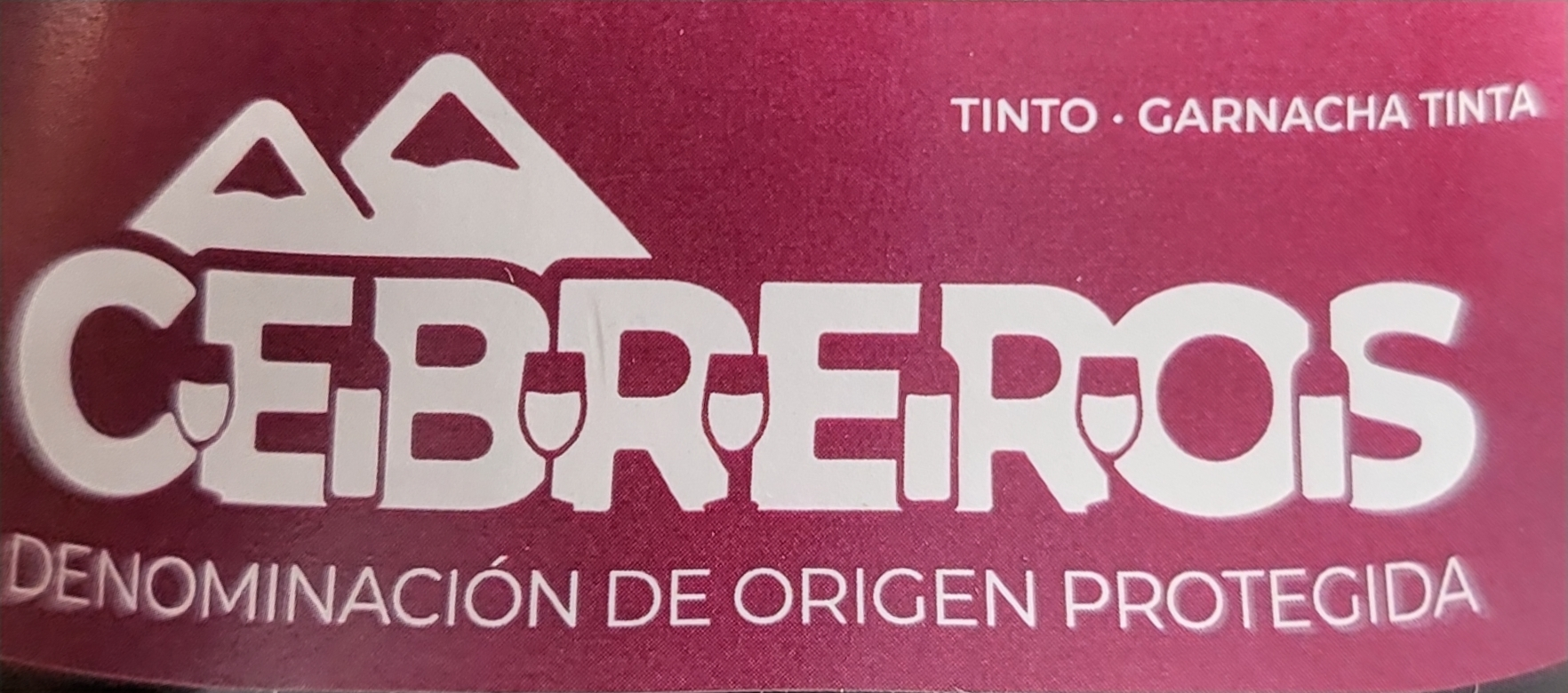
Cebreros in Ávila may be named after the zebro.

Place names across modern-day Spain and Portugal were derived from some form of the term zebro as early as the late 9th century. An 882 land grant and foundation for the Lordosa Church recorded cebrario as a creek connected to the Sousa River, and an 897 grant for churches near modern-day Vale de Cambra mentioned ezebrario as a hill in the area. By the 12th century, places across most of modern-day Portugal and much of modern-day Spain had been named after the zebro. For some areas, especially in northeastern Spain where holly naturally thrives but zebros were not recorded, it is debated whether they derive from zebro/cebro/encebro or from acebo, the Spanish term for holly. According to philologist Joaquín Pascual Barea, the place names most likely to refer to the animal are feminine names without a suffix, names beginning with an "e", and places that were flat or low in the mountains where steppe vegetation could grow to provide a suitable habitat. Place names most likely to refer to the holly were those beginning with an "a", those ending with "oso", "edo", or "al", and many ending with "ero" or "eiro", especially at higher elevations.

Many historical documents attest to the zebro inhabiting the peninsula until the 16th century. Medieval laws regulated the hunting of zebros as a big game animal. Forais, legal charters issued by Portugal during the Reconquista, offered specific regulations on transporting, selling, and taxing zebro leather. A smaller number of the Forais also regulated zebro meat, indicating that the animals were hunted near those areas.

A few of the medieval authors who mentioned zebros, offered more detailed descriptions of the animals. Circa 1265 AD, the Italian humanist Brunetto Latini wrote that the zebros of Old Castile were larger than red deer, had a dark stripe running down the length of their back, had large ears, were very fast, had weak feet, and tasted delicious. Latini wrote of onagers and zebros as separate, distinct animals. In the 14th-century Libro de la Montería, Alfonso XI of Castile wrote that zebros at that time were living in the Region of Murcia, specifically in Cieza, Caravaca, and Lorca. In Arte Cisoria (1423), Enrique de Villena wrote that zebro meat was eaten as a cure for laziness.

The final written mention of zebros from a person with firsthand experience was in the Topographic Relations of Philip II, published in 1576. This statistical survey described them as horses with an ashen color similar to the coat of a black rat and a dark snout. It said they neighed like mares and outran the riders who tried to hunt them down.

== Theories and research ==
Long after their disappearance, philologists have debated whether zebros were horses, donkeys, calves, deer, goats, bison, elk, or the plains zebra from Africa. In the late sixteenth century, Venetian explorer Antonio Pigafetta assumed the zebros were African zebras, but modern scholars have found that they were not. In the 1750s, Spanish scholar and monk Martín Sarmiento was the first to attempt to retrace the identity of the zebro. Sarmiento discovered that the mountains of Cebrero in Pedrafita do Cebreiro were previously called in Latin mons dicitur Onagrorum. He further found that many writings from the medieval period mentioned an animal called a cebro living in the Iberian Peninsula. Sarmiento concluded that zebro could be translated as onager. A century later, Paulo Merea found Latin documents that translated zebro into Latin as onagri, a term that directly referred to the Asiatic wild ass but was also used in Latin for other equids. However, Portuguese professor José Joaquim Nunes published a 1925 paper laying out the evidence that zebro accounts most closely match wild horses. This sparked debate on the exact species, which remains unresolved. In 1992, Carlos Nores began to investigate the animal's origin and found evidence that it was a native wild horse, possibly related to the Portuguese Sorraia breed or the wild tarpan.

In the 21st century, interdisciplinary researchers led by the University of Oviedo have gathered information that may lead to a definitive identification. Debate on the nature of zebros remains open.

The theory that zebros were a type of wild horse native to the Iberian Peninsula is consistent with the fossil record and surviving written accounts. Detractors of the wild horse theory argue that the zebro was treated as a different animal than the horse, but medieval authors differentiated between domesticated and wild subspecies of other animals, such as the wild boar and domesticated pig.

Another theory is that zebros were related to Equus hydruntinus, an extinct equid that lived in Europe during the Pleistocene. This theory is based on the linguistic connections between the zebro and wild asses, combined with the lack of any evidence of any migration into the peninsula. Although it inhabited the Iberian Peninsula for hundreds of thousands of years, the most recent remains of E. hydruntinus in the region date to 20,000 years ago. More recent remains in other parts of Europe have been dated to the Iron Age. For a time, it was believed that some remains of E. hydruntinus in the peninsula dated to the late medieval period, but these remains were later determined to be domesticated donkeys. A 2024 review of known E. hydruntinus remains found that there was "currently no zooarchaeological evidence to support" survival into the medieval period.

Another hypothesis is that they were a type of wild ass called onagers (Equus hemionus), imported from Asia. Some contemporary sources translated zebro into Latin as onagri, the Latin term for the Asiatic wild ass. However, that term had been used to describe other equids, such as the African wild ass. While it is possible that Muslims imported onagers to Iberia, there is no known documentation of this happening.

Still another position holds that zebro referred to feralized domesticated equids. According to historian Corina Liesau, there were several historic periods where epidemic diseases could have caused the abandonment of farmland and allowed domesticated donkeys to return to the wild and undergo a process of feralization.
