= Pedro Adão e Silva =

Portuguese politician

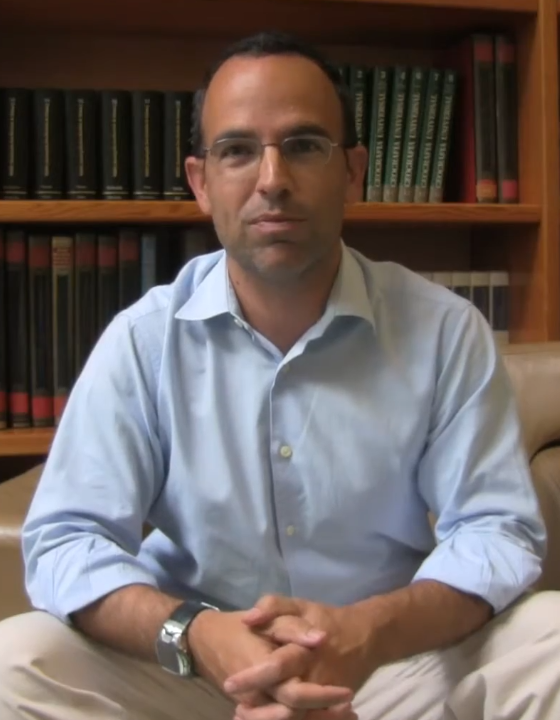
- Adão e Silva in 2015

Minister of Culture
- In office 30 March 2022 – 2 April 2024
- Prime Minister: António Costa
- Preceded by: Graça Fonseca
- Succeeded by: Dalila Rodrigues

Personal details
- Born: Pedro Adão e Silva Cardoso Pereira; 12 May 1974 (age 52) Lisbon, Portugal
- Party: Socialist Party (since 1992)
- Education: ISCTE, University of Lisbon

Pedro Adão e Silva Cardoso Pereira (born 12 May 1974) is a Portuguese sociologist, academic and politician. He was the Minister of Culture in the XXIII Constitutional Government of Portugal.
