= Teresa Morais =

Portuguese politician

Vice President of the Assembly of the Republic
- Incumbent
- Assumed office 27 March 2024
- President: José Pedro Aguiar-Branco

Minister of Culture, Equality and Citizenship
- In office 30 October 2015 – 26 November 2015
- Prime Minister: Pedro Passos Coelho
- Preceded by: Jorge Barreto Xavier (as Secretary of State of Culture)
- Succeeded by: João Soares

Secretary of State for Parliamentary Affairs and Equality
- In office 21 June 2011 – 30 October 2015
- Prime Minister: Pedro Passos Coelho
- Preceded by: Elza Pais
- Succeeded by: Pedro Lomba

Member of the Assembly of the Republic
- Incumbent
- Assumed office 26 March 2024
- Constituency: Setúbal
- In office 15 October 2009 – 24 October 2019
- Constituency: Leiria
- In office 4 April 2002 – 9 March 2005
- Constituency: Coimbra

Personal details
- Born: Maria Teresa da Silva Morais; 21 July 1959 (age 67) Lisbon, Portugal
- Party: Social Democratic Party (2002–present)
- Spouse: Luís Miguel Monteiro
- Children: 1
- Education: University of Lisbon
- Occupation: Lawyer • Professor • Politician

Maria Teresa da Silva Morais (born 21 July 1959) is a Portuguese politician who served as Minister of Culture, Equality and Citizenship in 2015. From 2011 to 2015, Morais served as the Secretary of State for Parliamentary Affairs and Equality. She is a member of the Social Democratic Party and was elected to the Assembly of the Republic in 2002 and again between the 2009 and 2019. She was Vice-President of the PSD and a member of the Permanent Political Commission led by Pedro Passos Coelho.

In March 2024, she was re-elected to the Assembly of the Republic as the first-choice candidate on the Democratic Alliance's Setúbal list for the 2024 legislative elections.
