= Pangea Trust =

Elephant sanctuary charity in Portugal

- Associação Natureza Pangea
- Formation: 2017; 9 years ago
- Type: Charitable organisation
- Registration no.: 1177137 (England and Wales); 517038110 (Portugal)
- Location(s): Alentejo, Portugal (sanctuary); registered in the United Kingdom and Portugal
- Services: Rehoming and lifetime care for elephants retired from zoos and circuses
- Fields: Animal welfare; nature restoration
- Key people: Kate Moore (managing director)
- Affiliations: Born Free Foundation; Fondation Brigitte Bardot; Olsen Animal Trust; World Animal Protection Denmark
- Website: pangeatrust.org

The Pangea Trust is a charitable organisation, registered in the United Kingdom and Portugal, that operates the Pangea Elephant Sanctuary in the Alentejo region of southern Portugal. Founded in the United Kingdom in 2017, the trust established an associated Portuguese non-profit in 2022. The sanctuary, on an estate between the municipalities of Alandroal and Vila Viçosa, has been described in Portuguese and international news reports as the first large-scale sanctuary in Europe for elephants retired from zoos and circuses. It was created to give these elephants, for which Europe has few other places to go, a large natural space in which to live.

The sanctuary received its first resident, Julie, at the end of June 2026. Portugal's last circus elephant, she was relocated under a voluntary agreement with the circus that had kept her since 1988, and her move left no wild animals in any Portuguese circus. A second elephant, Kariba, is due to join her from Belgium once she has recovered from a series of infections that delayed her transfer.

== Background ==
According to the trust, more than 600 elephants live in captivity across Europe, and a shortage of places for them to go has made animal welfare laws difficult to enforce. The Guardian reported in May 2026 that 36 elephants were living alone in European zoos. Pangea is modelled on large-scale elephant sanctuaries in Asia, Africa and the Americas.

In Portugal, the parliament approved a ban on the use of wild animals in circuses in 2018. The resulting law, Law No. 20/2019, entered into force in February 2019 and gave circuses up to six years to stop using them.

== History ==
The Pangea Trust was founded in 2017 and registered with the Charity Commission for England and Wales in February 2018. According to the organisation, a feasibility study of potential sites across Europe identified Portugal as having suitable habitat and climate for an elephant sanctuary. The trust was incorporated in Portugal in 2022 as Associação Natureza Pangea, a Portuguese non-profit association. It purchased an estate in the Alentejo in 2023 and began restoring the habitat.

In November 2024, working with Rewilding Portugal, the trust released Sorraia horses, one of the rarest native Portuguese breeds, onto the estate. The horses graze the land naturally, restoring vegetation and reducing wildfire risk as the site is prepared for elephants; it was the breed's first introduction in the Alentejo. The Explorers Club, the international exploration society, marked the release by presenting the trust with its Flag No. 179, a flag previously carried to Mount Everest in 1963 and to the North Pole, at a ceremony attended by the trust's royal patron, the Duchess of Cadaval.

Construction of the first barn and enclosure began in 2025. The project was publicly presented in November 2025, with the municipal councils of Alandroal and Vila Viçosa as partners and support from Portugal's Directorate-General for Food and Veterinary (DGAV) and the Institute for Nature Conservation and Forests (ICNF). In December 2025, the comedian Ricky Gervais named Pangea among 22 animal charities sharing £2.43 million in donations from platinum ticket sales on his Mortality stand-up tour. Pangea was among 17 of the charities that received £100,000 each.

The trust's work has also extended beyond elephants: in early 2026 it helped rehome Sona, Portugal's last circus tiger, at a sanctuary in Spain that specialises in big cats, one of the final steps in ending the use of wild animals in Portuguese circuses.

The trust completed the first phase of construction in March 2026. It comprised a barn with five internal stalls, designed for three to five elephants, and a series of connected outdoor habitats, the first of which includes a natural stream, a pool and a mud wallow for bathing.

== Sanctuary ==
The sanctuary covers about 400 hectares (about 1,000 acres) of a former cattle estate between Vila Viçosa and Alandroal, around 200 kilometres east of Lisbon. The first phase comprises 28 hectares, with plans to expand across the full site, and the land is being managed for nature restoration alongside elephant care. The trust has said the site could eventually house between 20 and 30 elephants, depending on habitat space and welfare studies, and that the project is funded by donations from organisations and the public. At the project's presentation in November 2025, Kate Moore, the trust's managing director, said the organisation expected to invest about €15 million in the sanctuary over roughly ten years.

Although the sanctuary is closed to the general public, the trust has made engagement with the local community one of its core aims. In April 2026 its community visit days welcomed 122 people to the site, among them local residents, school staff and students from Vila Viçosa, representatives of Alandroal municipality and local businesses, and it has also hosted a class of schoolchildren from Alandroal. The trust also plans annual visits by small groups of donors, school programmes, volunteering and research activity, and an open day for local residents.

== Elephants ==
The sanctuary's first two intended residents are Julie and Kariba, both female African elephants in their forties.

=== Julie ===
Julie was captured in southern Africa as a calf and, according to The Guardian, was acquired by the Victor Hugo Cardinali circus from a German zoo in 1988. She performed with the circus for more than three decades, retiring in 2024, and remained with it afterwards. Samba, the elephant she had lived alongside, died that same year, leaving Julie without the company of other elephants.

In May 2026, the Pangea Trust and the Cardinali circus jointly announced a voluntary agreement to relocate Julie to the sanctuary. Following veterinary health assessments, Julie was moved to the sanctuary on 29 June 2026, becoming its first resident. Her move completed the implementation of Portugal's ban. The trust said its specialist team would oversee her care, including support for the health and mobility needs common in elephants of her age.

Staff opened Julie's outdoor habitat within a day of her arrival, and she began exploring it and taking mud baths. In an update two months later, the trust reported that she had begun digging for roots with her tusks, lying down in her mud wallow and choosing to sleep outdoors in the habitat rather than in the barn, behaviour it described as a sign that she felt safe in her new home.

=== Kariba ===
Kariba was taken from the wild in Zimbabwe as a calf in the mid-1980s and sent to a zoo in Germany. She spent the following decades in zoos across Europe. She arrived at Olmense Zoo in Belgium in 2012, where she lived with another African elephant, Jenny; the zoo was renamed Pakawi Park in 2019. After Jenny died in 2022, Kariba was left alone, and the zoo began seeking a new home for her. The Born Free Foundation raised funds for her relocation to Pangea.

Her transfer was scheduled for late May 2026 but was postponed after an abscess was found on her foot shortly before she was due to travel; Born Free said the condition was treatable and that the move was delayed rather than cancelled. She has since been treated at Pakawi Park for two further infections under the supervision of Tim Bouts, an external veterinarian with several decades of experience with elephants. In August 2026 the trust reported that her infections were healing well and that it would decide on a travel date after monitoring her progress.

== Organisation and partnerships ==
Kate Moore, formerly a director at the Lilongwe Wildlife Trust in Malawi, is the trust's managing director.

The trust identifies the Born Free Foundation, the Fondation Brigitte Bardot, the Olsen Animal Trust and the Danish arm of World Animal Protection as founding members of the sanctuary, each represented on its board of trustees.

Diana, Duchess of Cadaval, is the trust's royal patron. Its ambassadors are the artist Joana Vasconcelos and the actor Peter Egan. Vasconcelos was described in the joint announcement by Pangea and the Cardinali circus as "a key force behind" the agreement to relocate Julie. The trust's development board is chaired by Anna Isserman; its members include the financier Ben Goldsmith and the former Portuguese culture minister Graça Fonseca.
