= Jorge Barreto Xavier =

Portuguese professor politician (born 1965)

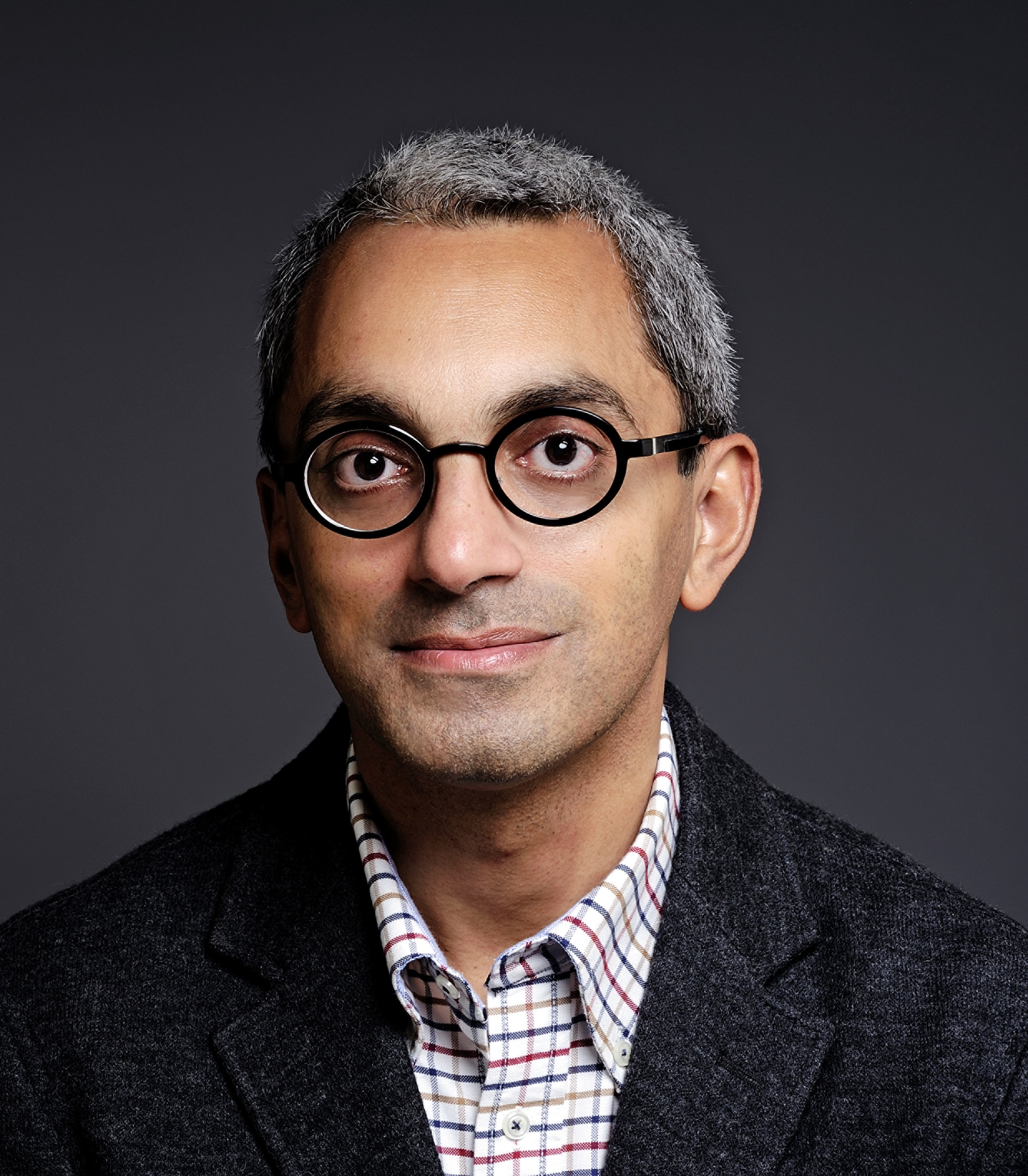
- Xavier in 2014

Secretary of State of Culture
- In office 26 October 2012 – 30 October 2015
- Prime Minister: Pedro Passos Coelho
- Preceded by: Francisco José Viegas
- Succeeded by: Teresa Morais (Minister of Culture)

Member of the Oeiras City Council
- In office January 2003 – April 2008

Personal details
- Born: 6 November 1965 (age 60) Goa, India
- Party: Social Democratic Party
- Education: University of Lisbon
- Occupation: Cultural manager Professor
- Profession: Lawyer
- Website: Official website

Jorge Barreto Xavier (born 6 November 1965) is a Portuguese cultural manager, university professor and politician. He served as the Secretary of State for Culture of the XIX Constitutional Government of Portugal from October 2012 to October 2015. under Prime Minister of Portugal Pedro Passos Coelho.

== Early life ==
Xavier was born in Goa, India. In 1970, he moved to Portugal, to the city of Guarda, Beira Interior. He lived in Guarda and Sabugal before he went to Lisbon in 1984 to study law. In 1986, when he was 20 years old, he founded the Portuguese Club of Arts and Ideas (in Portuguese: Clube Português de Artes e Ideias - CPAI).

== Career ==
In 1987, Xavier created and coordinated the 1st Portuguese Arts and Ideas Show, an initiative that aimed to present the contemporary art and that has integrated works in the fields of architecture, fine arts, comics, cinema, dance, graphic design, photography, literature, music, theatre and video, a pioneer joint in Portugal.

This presentation model would be used in further initiatives that he has directed, like "New values of Culture" (1988), "Culture and Development" (1989 and 1990), "Tendencies" (1991) and "Young Artists" (1992), a name that continues to be used in initiatives annually developed by the CPAI to promote artists in the beginning of their careers. In 1991, with colleagues from the first graduate program on Arts Management in Portugal (1989), he founded the Portuguese Association of Arts´ Managers. In 1992, creates the Paideia program- artistic animation on secondary schools, an initiative through which contemporary art (music, theatre, dance, photography, fine arts, video) was taken to 180 Portuguese secondary schools until 1997. Alongside that, since 1988, through the CPAI, he became representative of Portugal on the Biennial of Young Artists from Europe and the Mediterranean, important for the internationalization of the Portuguese artists in the 80's and 90's of the twentieth century. In 1994 he directed the 7th Edition of the Biennial of Lisbon, with more than 500 artists from 20 countries.

In 1997, he created the "Common Place- Experimentation Arts Centre" at a gunpowder factory in Barcarena, Oeiras. It was the first integrated centre of artistic experimentation in Portugal and one of the largest in Europe (with the possibility to work in several fields: visual arts, dance, music, theatre, writing, video and intermedia projects). Also in this year, created the "Biennial of Young Creators of Lusophone Countries", which continues to take place. Still on that period, as a member of the National Education Council, with Emília Nadal, he wrote the report "Arts Education, Aesthetic Education and the internationalization of Knowledge", published in 1998.

In January 2003 he became Deputy Mayor of the Municipality of Oeiras, in charge of Culture, Youth and Consumer's Protection. In Oeiras he created the Youth Network by extending the available public spaces to the young people throughout the municipality. On the Cultural area, he put into action the requalification project of Palácio Anjos, in Algés, to host the art collection Manuel Brito, one of the most important in the country. It was also in this period that Jorge Barreto Xavier led the Inter-ministerial Commission on Education/Culture. In January 2006, he began his collaboration with Calouste Gulbenkian Foundation, where, until April 2008, he led the project "Reintegration through Arts" on the Educational Centres of the Directorate-General of Social Reintegration from the Ministry of Justice.

In April 2008, he becomes General-Director for the Arts. On that position, Jorge Barreto Xavier leads the reform of the State supports for the artistic activities and draws and implement the program "Inov-Art" that would become, in 2009 and 2010, the biggest program of professional international internships in the Cultural field promoted by a public authority from the European Union, with more than 200 interns per year, allocated in dozens of cities from 28 countries of the five continents. In July 2010 he resigns from the position of General-Director for the Arts. In September 2011 he started teaching at ISCTE – Lisbon University Institute, by designing and teaching the modules of cultural policies and creative industries´ management.

Between 26 October 2012 and 30 October 2015 he was Secretary of State for Culture of the XIX Constitutional Government of Portugal, under the authority of the Prime-Minister, Pedro Passos Coelho.
