= Graça Fonseca =

Portuguese politician (born 1971)

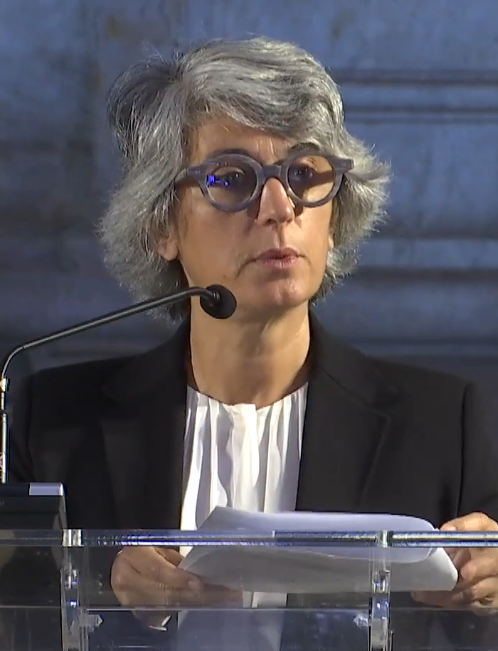
- Fonseca in 2020

Minister of Culture
- In office 15 October 2018 – 30 March 2022
- Prime Minister: António Costa
- Preceded by: Luís Filipe Castro Mendes
- Succeeded by: Pedro Adão e Silva

Secretary of State Assistant and of Administrative Modernisation
- In office 26 November 2015 – 15 October 2018
- Prime Minister: António Costa
- Preceded by: Gonçalo Saraiva Matias
- Succeeded by: Luís Goes Pinheiro

Member of the Lisbon City Council
- In office 2009–2015

Personal details
- Born: Graça Maria da Fonseca Caetano Gonçalves; 13 August 1971 (age 55) Lisbon, Portugal
- Party: Socialist Party
- Education: University of Lisbon; University of Coimbra; ISCTE – University Institute of Lisbon
- Occupation: Sociologist, politician

Graça Maria da Fonseca Caetano Gonçalves (born 13 August 1971) is a Portuguese sociologist and Socialist Party politician who served as Minister of Culture in the governments of Prime Minister António Costa from 15 October 2018 to 30 March 2022. She was Secretary of State Assistant and of Administrative Modernisation from 2015 to 2018 and led the creation of Portugal's national participatory budget in that post. She sat on the Lisbon City Council from 2009 to 2015.

In 2017 Fonseca became the first serving member of a Portuguese government to come out as gay. Since leaving government she has co-founded the sustainability agency Because Impacts and the Lisbon foundation Fundação Futura.

== Early life and education ==
Fonseca was born in Lisbon on 13 August 1971. She is the daughter of a physicist and an engineer. She graduated in law from the University of Lisbon, took a master's degree in sociology at the Faculty of Economics of the University of Coimbra and received a doctorate in sociology from ISCTE – University Institute of Lisbon. She presented her doctoral thesis in 2010. It dealt with discrimination against foreign nationals in the Portuguese justice system.

== Career ==
=== Research and early government roles ===
In the late 1990s Fonseca was a researcher at the Centre for Social Studies of the University of Coimbra. She joined the Socialist Party in 2000 and moved in the same year to the Ministry of Justice, which António Costa then headed. From 2005 to 2007 she was Costa's chief of staff when he was Minister of State and Internal Administration in the government of José Sócrates.

=== Lisbon City Council ===
Fonseca moved to the Lisbon City Council in 2007 and was a councillor (vereadora) from 2009 to 2015. Her portfolio covered the economy, innovation, education and administrative reform. During her term the European Committee of the Regions named Lisbon a European Entrepreneurial Region for 2015. Lisbon was the first city to receive the award, which had gone only to regions until then. Fonseca said it showed Lisbon as a place to "work, invest and live" as well as a tourist destination.

=== Secretary of State ===
Fonseca stood on the Socialist Party list for the Lisbon constituency in the 2015 Portuguese legislative election. On 26 November 2015 she took office as Secretary of State Assistant and of Administrative Modernisation in the XXI Constitutional Government.

In that post she led the Orçamento Participativo Portugal, which was announced in 2016 and described as the first participatory budgeting process run at national level. The government allocated €3 million to it in the first year and collected proposals from January 2017.

=== Minister of Culture ===
Fonseca was appointed Minister of Culture in the cabinet reshuffle of October 2018 and replaced Luís Filipe Castro Mendes. She was elected to the Assembly of the Republic for Lisbon in the 2019 Portuguese legislative election from sixth place on the Socialist list. She kept the culture portfolio in the XXII Constitutional Government.

Fonseca presented her first budget to parliament on 30 October 2018. She announced a 13% increase in the culture budget for 2019, a cut in value-added tax on cultural performances from 13% to 6%, a National Arts Plan run jointly with the Ministry of Education and a new national sound archive.

In May 2019 the government set up a Commission for the Acquisition of Contemporary Art under her ministry and gave it €300,000 a year to buy works by Portuguese artists for the State collection. The programme of State acquisitions had been paused for about 20 years. Its annual budget rose to €500,000 in 2020 and to €650,000 in 2021, when the commission acquired 73 works.

In late July 2020, during the COVID-19 pandemic, a reporter at a presentation of State art acquisitions asked Fonseca about hardship among culture professionals. She declined to answer and closed with a reference to a "late-afternoon drink". The remark drew public criticism. Fonseca said afterwards that her words had been taken out of context and pointed to a new €34 million support line for the sector.

In April 2021 the Council of Ministers held a meeting devoted to culture. It approved €150 million of investment in 46 museums and monuments and 3 national theatres, a Portuguese Contemporary Art Network and, in outline, a Statute for Professionals in the Area of Culture. Fonseca called the statute a long-standing demand of the sector and said it would bring thousands of professionals into the social protection system. The government approved the final statute on 21 October 2021 and it took effect on 1 January 2022. The statute covers professional registration, employment contracts and social protection, and it created a benefit for involuntary interruptions of work.

Fonseca left office on 30 March 2022, when the XXIII Constitutional Government was sworn in. Pedro Adão e Silva succeeded her.

== Later career ==
In 2022 Fonseca co-founded Because Impacts and became its chief executive. The consultancy works to reduce the environmental footprint and increase the social impact of large public events. She is the promoter of BOIL, a climate festival that brings together science, art and comedy. It was held at the Serralves Foundation in Porto from 25 to 29 September 2024. She also teaches at the Nova School of Business and Economics.

She presented the programme Ministério do Futuro on the radio station TSF with the former minister Miguel Poiares Maduro until December 2023.

Fonseca co-founded Fundação Futura with the American philanthropist Ruth Shaber and Glenn Barnes. The foundation was registered in October 2024 and is based in the Chiado district of Lisbon. In July 2026 it launched a bilingual quarterly literary magazine of poetry called the Lisbon Literary Review.

Fonseca serves on the development board of the Pangea Trust, which runs an elephant sanctuary in Portugal.

== Recognition ==
ILGA Portugal gave Fonseca one of its Prémios Arco-Íris in January 2018 for countering the silence and invisibility of LGBTI people by speaking publicly as a lesbian. In 2023 the Apolitical Foundation and the Democracy and Culture Foundation inducted her into their "Democratic Innovators of the 21st Century" Politicians' Hall of Fame for leading the creation of the first national participatory budgeting process.

== Personal life ==
Fonseca came out publicly in an interview with Diário de Notícias in August 2017, when she was Secretary of State. She said that knowing public figures are gay could change how people see others who are. The newspaper reported that no member of a Portuguese government had done so before, and the president of ILGA Portugal called it a historic statement. When Fonseca joined the cabinet in 2018, the Socialist deputy Isabel Moreira described her as Portugal's first openly lesbian minister.

== See also ==
- LGBTQ rights in Portugal
- List of LGBTQ politicians in Portugal
