= Gabriela Canavilhas =

Portuguese classical pianist and politician

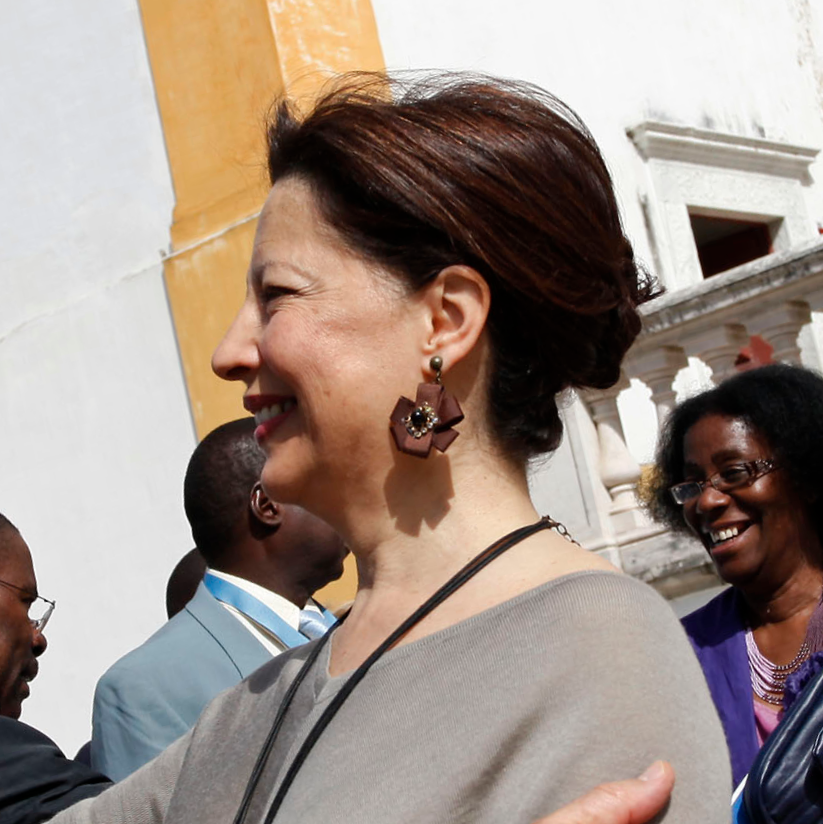

Minister of Culture, Portugal
- In office 2009–2011

Member of the Assembly of the Portuguese Republic
- In office 2011–2018
- Parliamentary group: Portuguese Socialist Party (PS)

Personal details
- Born: Maria Gabriela da Silveira Ferreira; 29 March 1961 (age 65) Lubango, Angola
- Party: Portuguese Socialist Party (PS)
- Spouse: José Manuel Pinheiro Lopes Canavilhas
- Children: One daughter
- Education: NOVA University Lisbon
- Occupation: Classical pianist

Gabriela Canavilhas (born 1961) is a Portuguese classical pianist, music teacher and former politician. As well as being the Minister of Culture between 2009 and 2011, she was a deputy in the Assembly of the Republic from 2011 until 2018.

== Early life ==
Maria Gabriela da Silveira Ferreira Canavilhas was born in Lubango (formerly known as Sá da Bandeira) in Angola on 29 March 1961. Living briefly in Mozambique, she spent most of her childhood and adolescence on São Miguel Island in the Portuguese island group of the Azores, apart from two years spent in the USA. She obtained a degree in Musical Sciences from the Faculty of Social and Human Sciences of the NOVA University Lisbon and took a further Piano Course at the National Conservatory of Lisbon. She then taught at the Academia de Amadores de Música (1982–1986) before joining the School of Music at the National Conservatory in 1986.

== Pianist ==
As a pianist, between 1986 and 2004 she performed throughout Portugal, as well as in the US, Canada, Brazil, Macau, Italy and Germany. She was known for playing works by Portuguese composers, such as the 19th century pianist João Domingos Bomtempo, and more recent composers such as Vianna da Motta, Alfredo Keil, Fernando Lopes-Graça, Frederico de Freitas, and Luis de Freitas Branco. She paid attention to the works of modern composers, such as Eurico Carrapatoso and Clotilde Rosa, often giving first performances of their work. She produced seven CDs of Portuguese music, including some previously unrecorded. Among her other roles, she has been President of the Lisbon Metropolitan Orchestra (2003/2008), president of the Academia Nacional Superior de Orquestra, founder and artistic director of the MusicAtlântico Festival (1999–2009) in the Azores, and a member of the Board of Trustees of the Luso-American Foundation for Development (FLAD). She also presented a television programme on Portuguese museums.

== Political life ==
In 2002, Canavilhas was a candidate for the Portuguese Socialist Party (PS) in the Azores in the national elections but was not elected. In 2009 she was appointed Minister of Culture of Portugal, a position she filled until 2011. She then represented the PS in the Assembly of the Republic between 2011 and August 2018, when she resigned. She largely concentrated on matters relating to Culture, Education and Foreign Affairs. Her achievements included a successful campaign to have a collection of paintings by Joan Miró stay in Portugal. In 2017, she became a councillor in Cascais municipality but resigned in 2018, complaining of corrupt practices.

== Recent activities ==
After resigning from both the national parliament and from the Cascais council, Canavilhas enrolled to take a PhD at the Instituto Superior de Ciências Sociais e Políticas (Higher Institute of Social Sciences and Politics – ISCSP), with a thesis on "Female characters in Opera, The Voices of a Gender discourse". She returned to work at the National Conservatory and began to collaborate with a project of the Ministry of Education to support elementary schools in the areas of music and dance. She also broadcast a radio programme on RTP. Canavilhas has been a non-Executive member of the Board of Directors of Fundação Oriente and a member of the General Council of the Universidade Aberta. She is married to José Manuel Pinheiro Lopes Canavilhas and they have one daughter.

== Prizes won ==
As a pianist, Canavilhas won the following prizes:

- 1st Prize at the V International Competition "Città di Moncalieri" in Turin, Italy – 1990;
- 1st Prize for Classical Music in the National Culture and Development Competition promoted by the Portuguese Club of Arts and Ideas – 1989
- 1st Prize in the Dame Ruth Railton Award – 1976.

== Recordings ==
- CD: Song and Piano Pieces by Alfredo Keil;
- CD: Music for Clarinet and Piano of the 20th century;
- CD: Portuguese and Brazilian works from the 18th and 19th centuries;
- CD: Quintets for Piano and String Quartet by J. Domingos Bomtempo;
- CD: Sonatas for Piano by J. Domingos Bomtempo;
- CD: Works from the historical repertoire of the Palácio Nacional da Ajuda.
