= João Domingos Bomtempo =

Portuguese classical pianist, composer and pedagogue (1775 - 1842)

João Domingos Bomtempo ComC
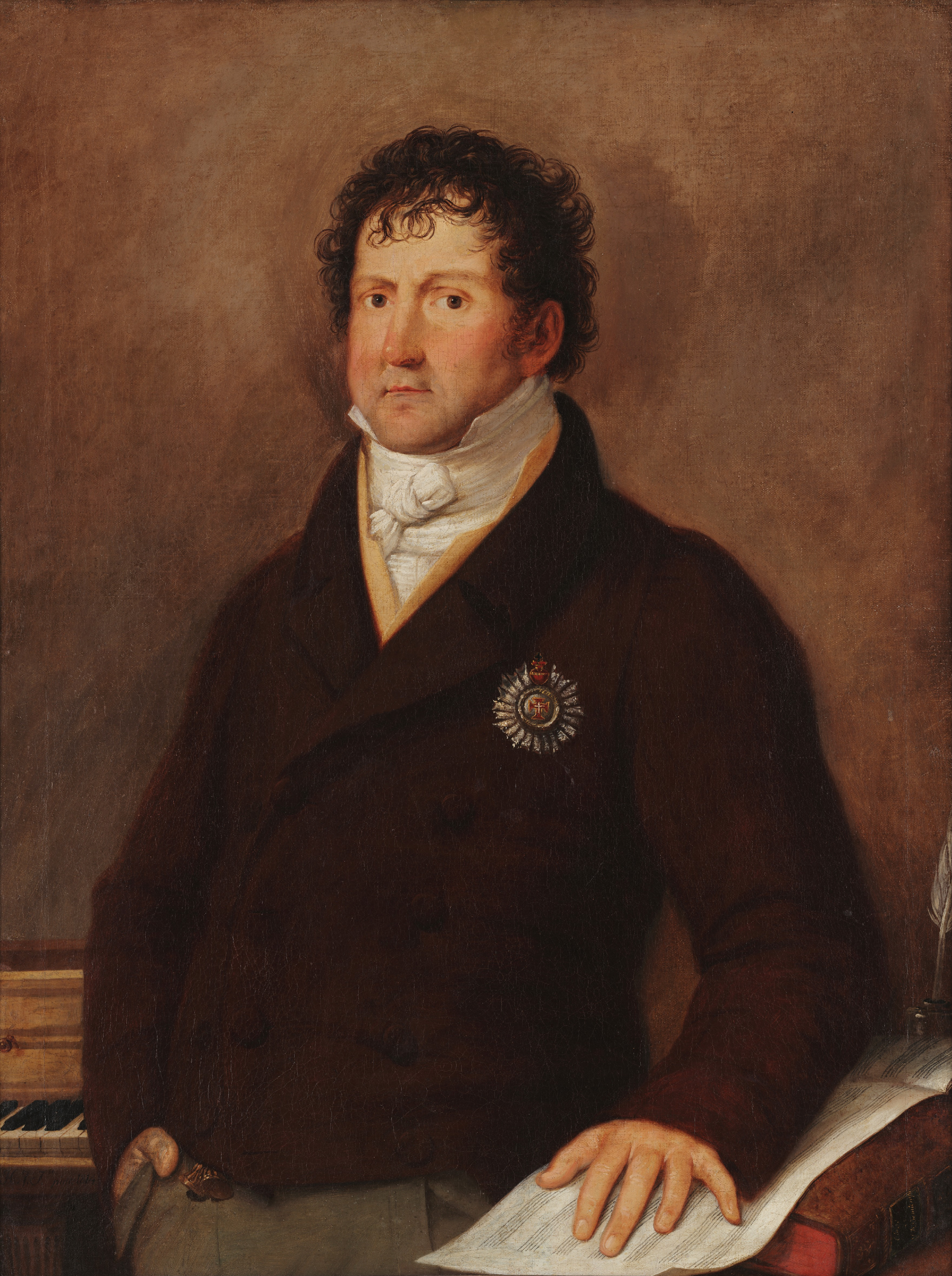
- 1814 portrait by Henrique José da Silva (National Museum of Music, Lisbon)
- Born: 28 December 1775; Lisbon, Portugal
- Died: 18 August 1842 (aged 66); Lisbon, Portugal
- Occupation: Composer
- Notable work: Messe de Requiem, Op.23 ("In Memory of Camões") (1819)
- Style: Romantic
- Spouse: Maria das Dores de Almeida (after 1836)

João Domingos Bomtempo (Portuguese pronunciation: [ʒuˈɐ̃w duˈmĩɡuʒ βõˈtẽpu]; also Buontempo; Lisbon, 28 December 1775 – Lisbon, 18 August 1842) was a Portuguese classical pianist, composer and pedagogue.

== Biography ==
Bomtempo was the son of an Italian musician in the Portuguese court orchestra, and studied at the Music Seminary of the Patriarchal See in Lisbon. Unlike most of his contemporaries, he was not interested in opera and, in 1801, instead of going to Italy, he traveled to Paris, where he started a career as a virtuoso pianist. He moved to London in 1810 and became acquainted with liberal circles in that city.

During 1822 he returned to Lisbon, and founded there a Philharmonic Society to promote public concerts of contemporary music. After the Portuguese civil war between liberals and absolutists had resulted in a liberal victory, Bomtempo became a music teacher to the young Queen Maria II of Portugal and first Director of the National Conservatory, created in 1835 to replace the old Patriarchal Seminary, which had been abolished by the new liberal regime.

Bomtempo composed a vast number of concertos, sonatas, variations and fantasies for the piano. His two known symphonies are the first to be produced by a Portuguese composer. But his largest work, and probably his masterpiece, is his Requiem in memory of Luís de Camões, which has been released on CD.

== List of compositions ==
- Op. 1 – Piano Sonata No. 1 in F major
- Op. 2 – Piano Concerto No.1 in E♭ major (ca. 1804)
- Op. 3 – Piano Concerto No.2 in F minor (ca. 1800–1810)
- Op. 4 – Fandango & Variations for piano
- Op. 5 – Piano Sonata No. 2 in C minor
- Op. 6 – Introduction, 5 variations & fantasy on Paisiello's favorite air for piano
- Op. 7 – Piano Concerto No. 3 in G minor
- Op. 8 – Capriccio & Variations on God save the King for piano in E♭ major
- Op. 9 No. 1 – Piano Sonata No. 3 in E♭ major
- Op. 9 No. 2 – Piano Sonata No. 4 in C major
- Op. 9 No. 3 – Sonata for violin and harpsichord in E major
- Op. 10a – Hymno lusitano (cantata); Arrangement by the composer for piano 4-hands titled: March of Lord Wellington
- Op. 10b – La Virtù Trionfante (cantata)
- Op. 11 – Symphony No. 1 in E♭ major
- Op. 12 – Piano Concerto No. 4 in D major (1811–1812)
- Op. 13 – Piano Sonata No. 5 in C major
- Op. 14 – Fantasia for piano in C minor
- Op. 15 No. 1 – Piano Sonata No. 6 in A♭ major
- Op. 15 No. 2 – Piano Sonata No. 7 in G minor
- Op. 15 No. 3 – Variations for piano on a popular French song
- Op. 16 – Piano Quintet in E♭ major
- Op. 17 – A paz da Europa (cantata)
- Op. 18 No. 1 – Piano Sonata No. 8 in G major
- Op. 18 No. 2 – Piano Sonata No. 9 in F minor
- Op. 18 No. 3 – Piano Sonata No.10 in E♭ major
- Op. 19 – 12 Studies for piano (1816)
- Op. 20 – Piano Sonata No. 11 in E♭ major
- Op. 21 – Variations for piano on a theme from Die Zauberflöte in G minor
- Op. 22 – Variations for piano on a theme from Alessandro in Efeso in B♭ major
- Op. 23 – Requiem in C minor (1819–1820)
- Op. 24 – Piano Concerto No. 5 in C minor/major
- 4 Absolutions, B5
- Libera me Domine in C minor
- Piano Concerto No. 6 in E minor, B26 (1810–1840)
- Piano Quintet in D minor, B74
- Serenata for piano and winds in F major, B75 (1821–1830)
- Symphony No. 2 in D major, B16
- Te Deum in F major, B10
- Variations for piano on a theme from La donna del Lago in E minor (1822)
- Fantasy for piano and orchestra (on a theme from La donna del Lago)
- Waltz for piano
- Alessandro in Efeso, opera seria
- Tantum Ergo, Kyrie, Gloria e Credo (1842)
