= Sorraia =

Breed of horse

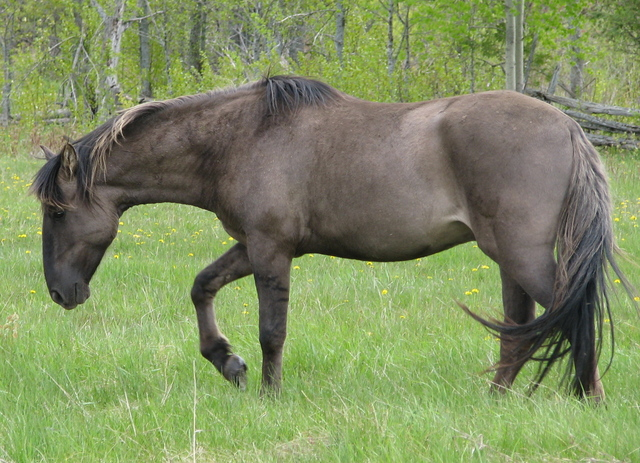
- A Sorraia stallion
- Conservation status: DOM
- Country of origin: Indigenous to the southwestern Iberian Peninsula, today present mainly in Portugal and Germany

Traits
- Distinguishing features: Lean, leggy conformation, good withers, slim neck, convex profile; grulla or dun, typically without white markings

The Sorraia is a rare breed of horse indigenous to the southern Iberian Peninsula, in the Sorraia River basin in Portugal. The Sorraia is known for its primitive features, including a convex profile and dun coloring with primitive markings. Concerning its origins, a theory has been advanced by some authors that the Sorraia is a descendant of primitive horses belonging to the naturally occurring wild fauna of Southern Iberia. Genetic studies have placed the breed apart from most other Iberian breeds without resolving its relationship to wild horse populations.

Members of the breed are small, but hardy and well-adapted to harsh conditions. They were captured and used by native farmers for centuries, and a remnant population of these nearly extinct horses was discovered by a Portuguese zoologist in the early 20th century. Every living Sorraia descends from twelve horses gathered in the 1930s, and the breed's very low genetic diversity, high level of inbreeding and associated subfertility are the central problems facing its conservation. It is kept in two main breeding populations, one in Portugal and a smaller one in Germany, and a studbook was first published in 2004.

== Characteristics ==
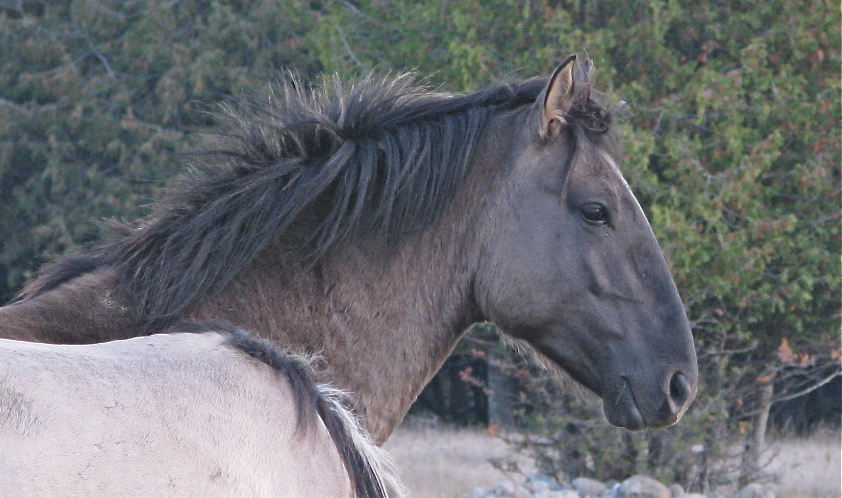
The characteristic convex facial profile

The Sorraia breed stands between 14.1 and 14.3 hands (57 and 59 inches, 145 and 150 cm) high, although some individuals are as small as 12.3 hands (51 inches, 130 cm) The head tends to be large, the profile convex, and the ears long. The neck is slender and long, the withers high, and the croup slightly sloping. The legs are strong, with long pasterns and well-proportioned hooves. These horses have good endurance and are easy keepers, thriving on relatively little fodder. They have a reputation for being independent of temperament, but tractable.

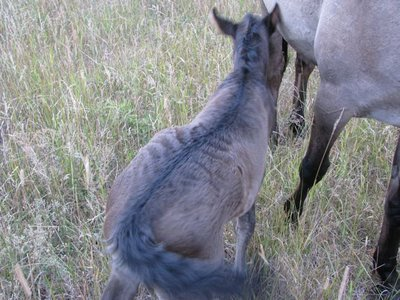
Foal with primitive markings and "hair stroke"

On adult horses, the lay of the hair can create the appearance of stars and flags on the neck and chest. Also due to the lay of the hair, newborn foals can appear to have stripes all over, reminiscent of zebra stripes. The breed standard refers to this as "hair stroke".

Sorraia are generally dun or a dun variation called grullo. The dun pattern arises because pigment is deposited asymmetrically around each growing hair, under the control of the TBX3 transcription factor, which determines how melanocytes are distributed in the hair follicle. Dun is the ancestral coloring of the horse, and the variants that remove it are present in ancient horse DNA, showing that the polymorphism predates domestication. Dun coloring includes primitive markings such as a black dorsal stripe, black tipped ears, horizontal striping on the legs and a dark muzzle area. The dark muzzle area is in contrast to some other dun-colored horse breeds, who have light-colored muzzle areas and underbellies, possibly due to the presence of pangare genetics. Sorraia horses have bi-colored manes and tails with lighter colored hairs that fringe the outside of the longer growing black hair. This is a characteristic shared with other predominantly dun-colored breeds, such as the Fjord horse. Purebred Sorraia occasionally have white markings, although they are rare and undesired by the breed's studbook.

== Behavior ==
The social behavior of the breed has been studied in a Sorraia herd kept under extensive management in Portugal. Among ten adult mares, dominance relationships were clear and stable and formed a significantly linear hierarchy, with rank positively correlated with age; agonistic interactions appeared to function mainly in regulating space rather than in gaining access to food or reasserting rank. Affiliative bonds were reciprocal and strongest between mares that were more closely related, although mares with stronger bonds or closer kinship were not less aggressive toward one another.

== Genetics ==
The relationship between the Sorraia and other breeds remains largely undetermined, as is its relationship to the Tarpan and to Przewalski's horse. The Sorraia originally developed in the southern part of the Iberian Peninsula. d'Andrade hypothesized that the Sorraia would be the ancestor of the Southern Iberian breeds. Morphologically, scientists place the Sorraia as closely related to the Gallego and the Asturcon, but genetic studies using mitochondrial DNA show that the Sorraia forms a cluster that is largely separated from most Iberian breeds. Some evidence links this cluster with Konik and domestic Mongolian horses. At the same time, one of the maternal lineages is shared with the Lusitano. Genetic evidence has not supported a hypothesis that the Sorraia is related to the Barb horse, an African breed introduced to Iberia by the Moors.

Multiple authors have suggested that the Sorraia might be a descendant of the Tarpan based on shared morphological features, principally the typical color of its coat. Other authors simply state that the Sorraia has "evident primitive characteristics", although they do not refer to a specific ancestor. However, there have been no genetic studies comparing the Sorraia with the Tarpan, and similarity of external morphology is an unreliable measure of relatedness.

Genetic studies to date have been inconclusive about the closest relative of the Sorraia. On one hand, studies using mitochondrial DNA showed a relationship with the Przewalski's Horse, in that Przewalski's Horse has a unique haplotype (A2) not found in domestic horses, which differs by just one single nucleotide from one of the major Sorraia haplotypes (JSO41, later A7). In comparison, genetic distances within the domestic horse are as large as 11 nucleotide differences. However, this relationship with the Przewalski's Horse was contradicted in another study using microsatellite data that showed that the genetic distance between Przewalski's horse and the Sorraia was the largest. Such conflicting results can arise when a population passes through a genetic bottleneck, and evidence suggests that the Sorraia, among other rare breeds, has recently passed through a bottleneck, effectively obscuring the position of this breed in the family tree of the domestic horse. Later work has reframed the comparison with Przewalski's horse: an analysis of 42 ancient horse genomes concluded that Przewalski's horses are the feral descendants of horses herded by the Botai culture rather than a never-domesticated wild population, and that domestic horses from about 4,000 years ago onwards carry only around 2.7% Botai-related ancestry. Two Sorraia have since been whole-genome sequenced as part of a comparison of breed and non-breed horses, which used runs of homozygosity, long stretches of identical sequence, as a measure of low genetic diversity. Thus, the morphological, physiological, and cultural characteristics of the Sorraia are the subject of continued study to better understand the relationship between various Iberian horse breeds and wild horse populations.

== Health and fertility ==
The breed's low genetic diversity has measurable consequences for health and reproduction. A comparison of the Sorraia with two other Portuguese and four New World breeds found less variation at the major histocompatibility complex class II DRA locus in the Sorraia than in the others, which the authors suggested could mean reduced disease resistance.

Sorraia stallions are subfertile. An assessment of 113 ejaculates from four stallions found their semen quality to be very poor by comparison with the Lusitano. A later study of eleven outwardly normal but subfertile stallions found normal sperm concentration but consistently low proportions of progressively motile sperm (21%) and morphologically normal sperm (28%). All eleven had a normal 64,XY karyotype, but 11% of their sperm carried sex chromosome aneuploidies, which the authors suggested could partly account for the low fertility.

== Breed history ==
Although it is known that the Sorraia developed in the southern part of the Iberian Peninsula, the breed was isolated and unknown to science until the 20th century. Despite the lack of documentation, attempts have been made to reconstruct its history. Paleolithic parietal art images in the region depict equines with a distinct likeness to the Sorraia, with similar zebra-like markings. Analysis of mtDNA has been performed on Mustangs in the western United States that show similar mtDNA patterns between some Mustangs and the Sorraia breed. Spanish conquistadors took Iberian horses, some of whom closely resembled the modern-day Sorraia, to the Americas in their conquests, probably as pack animals. Similarities between the Sorraia and several North and South American breeds are shown in the dun and grullo coloring and various physical characteristics. This evidence suggests that the Sorraia, their ancestors, or other horses with similar features, may have had a long history in the Iberian region and a role in the creation of American breeds. A study of the mitochondrial control region in 153 horses from 30 Iberian and New World breeds found Iberian haplotypes at high frequency in the New World breeds, and found reduced variation in the Sorraia, the Menorquina and the Sulphur Mustang consistent with bottlenecks or a limited number of founders.

Otherwise, the Sorraia breed was lost to history until 1920, when Portuguese zoologist and paleontologist Ruy d'Andrade first encountered the Sorraia horse during a hunting trip in the Portuguese lowlands. This remnant herd of primitive horses had continued to live a wild existence in these lowlands, which were rather inaccessible and had been used as a hunting preserve by Portuguese royalty until the early 1900s. At the time of d'Andrade's initial meeting the breed, the horses were ill-regarded by native farmers, although they were considered hardy native fauna that lived off of the uncultivated lands and salt marshes in the local river valleys. For centuries, peasant farmers of the area would occasionally capture the horses and use them for agricultural work, including threshing grain and herding bulls.

In the 1920s and 1930s, as mechanization became more prevalent, both wild and domesticated breeding stock diminished to almost nothing, and d'Andrade, along with his son Fernando, encouraged the conservation of the breed. In 1937, d'Andrade began a small herd of his own with five stallions and seven mares from horses obtained near Coruche, Portugal. All Sorraias currently in captivity descend from these original horses obtained by d'Andrade, and it is believed that the remnant wild herds of the breed died out soon after. These horses were kept in a habitat similar to their native one. In 1975, two other farms took up the Sorraia's cause and acquired small herds to help with conservation. In 1976, three stallions and three mares were imported to Germany from Portugal to begin a sub-population there. In March 2004, a small breeding herd of Sorraia horses was released on the estate of a private land owner who dedicated a portion of his property so that these horses could live completely wild, as did their ancestors. The refuge created for them is in the Vale de Zebro region of south-western Portugal, one of many Iberian place names derived from zebro. In 2021, a herd of ten Sorraia, two males and eight females, was released on a 60-hectare site at Vale Carapito in the Greater Côa valley in northern Portugal as part of a rewilding project run by Rewilding Europe. Today, the breed is critically endangered. Fewer than 200 Sorraia survived in 2007, including around 80 breeding mares, and the breed was then placed in the Food and Agriculture Organization's "critical-maintained" risk category. The first studbook was published in 2004, dedicated to maintaining a written record of the bloodlines of the Sorraia. Sorraias are present mainly in Portugal, with a small population in Germany. While not bred for a specific use, the Sorraia horses are versatile and have been used in herding bulls, dressage riding and light harness.

=== American preservation efforts ===
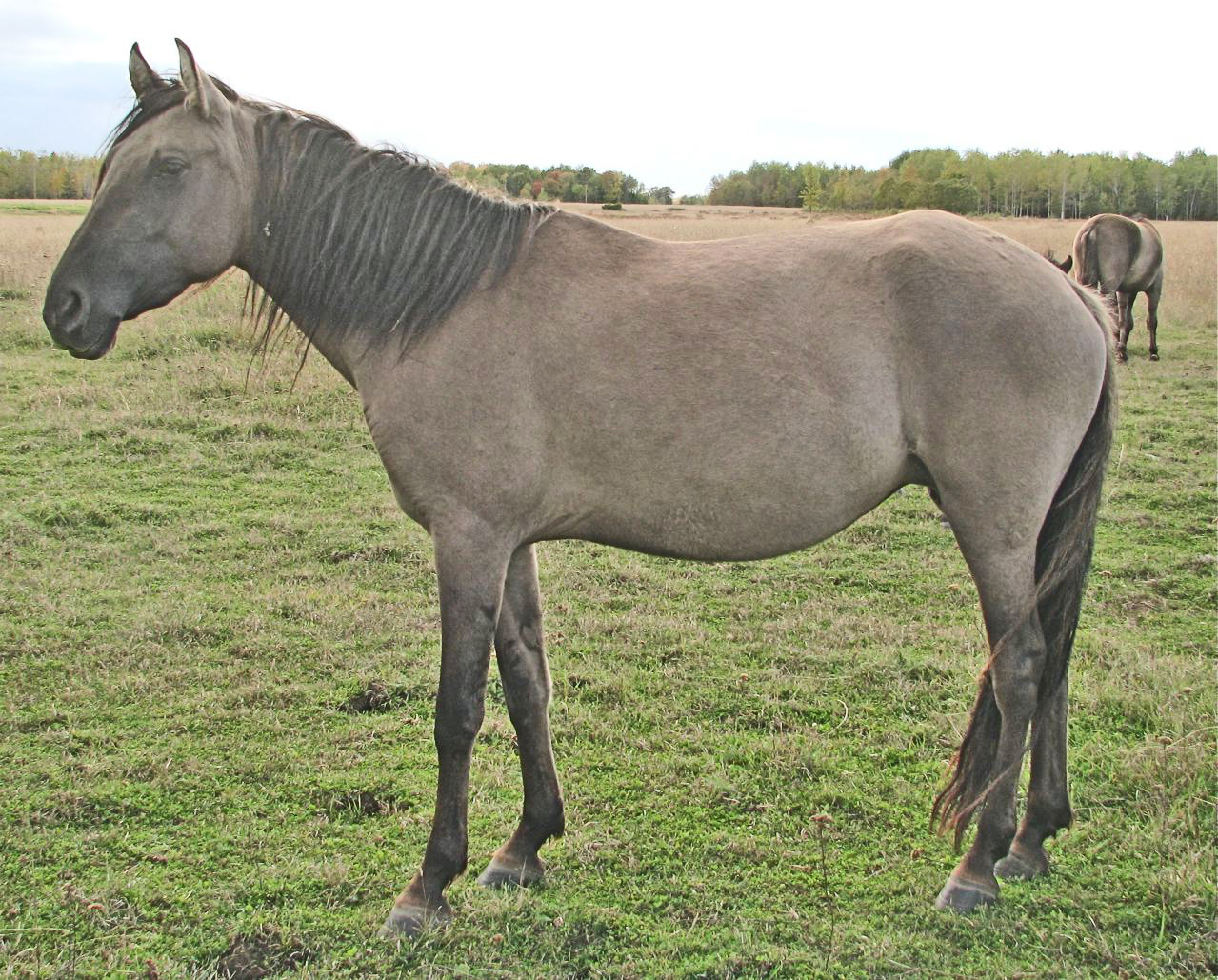
A Kiger Mustang mare of Sorraia phenotype used as a foundation broodmare on Manitoulin Island in Ontario

Two Sorraia stallions were imported to the United States in the early 21st century. In 2006, another Sorraia stallion was imported to Canada where a Sorraia Mustang Preserve has been established on Manitoulin Island in Ontario. Unrelated to existing preservation efforts which work in conjunction with the Sorraia Mustang Studbook, another project by a consortium of breeders in the United States is attempting to establish a separate network and studbook. These breeders have gathered Spanish Mustangs that through mtDNA testing show a genetic relationship with the Sorraia and are breeding them according to both genotype and phenotype in an attempt to help preserve what they are calling the "American Sorraia Mustang".

=== Naming ===
Ruy d'Andrade gave the breed its name of "Sorraia", taking it from the Sorraia River in Portugal. It has been suggested that the horses were previously known locally as "zebro" or "zebra" because of their markings. The identity of the zebro, an equid widely reported in medieval Iberia and recorded in some 155 place names from 882 AD onwards, is unresolved. A 2015 review judged the evidence equating it with the Sorraia to be "weak, purely circumstantial, and non-specific", and also rejected the long-standing identification of the zebro with the extinct European wild ass. In the time of Christopher Columbus, the Sorraia was also known as the Marismeño, but the Sorraia and the Marismeño have evolved into two different breeds over time. Today, the name Marismeño refers to a population of semiferal horses living in Doñana National Park in Spain.
