= Vitorino Magalhães Godinho =

Portuguese historian and social scientist

Vitorino Magalhães Godinho (9 June 1918, in Lisbon – 26 April 2011, in Lisbon) was a Portuguese historian and social scientist.

== Education and career ==
Magalhães Godinho graduated in 1940 in philosophy and history from the Faculty of Letters of the University of Lisbon. The same year witnessed the publication of his first important work, Razão e história (Reason and history). He was a lecturer from 1942 to 1944 at the Faculty of Letters of the University of Lisbon. He soon departed the University to give free lectures (1944–1946) at the Ateneu Comercial de Lisboa; the lectures were popular and attended by several scholars, such as Jorge Borges de Macedo, Joaquim Barradas de Carvalho, and Joel Serrão, who later became leading figures in Portuguese historiography. To support himself, Magalhães Godinho worked at a commercial publishing company and was responsible for the publication of several important texts. He moved to Paris in 1947 to become a researcher with CNRS, working there until 1960. He returned to Portugal for a brief period in the 1960s but due to political problems he was forced to give up teaching in 1962 and then returned to France. He received in 1969 his doctorate from the Sorbonne with dissertation L’Économie de l’empire portugais aux XV^{e} et XVI^{e} siècles. In 1969 he published a Portuguese version of his dissertation.

He was a professor at the University of Clermont-Ferrand from 1970 to 1974. Taking advantage of the change in regime in 1974, he returned to Portugal and attempted to introduce a new educational policy there. He was appointed Minister of Education and Culture in July 1974 but resigned in November of that year. He published, in his capacity as Minister, a book suggesting a reform of the Portuguese education system. He was a full professor of the Faculty of Social Sciences and Humanities of the Universidade Nova de Lisboa and coordinator of the department of sociology from 1975 to 1988. He was in 1976 elected a corresponding member of the Academia Brasileira de Letras and in 1991 awarded the Balzan Prize for history. In 1978, he founded the journal Revista de História Económica e Social. He also served in public office in 1984 as the Director of the National Library in Lisbon.

Much of his research traced to the 1200s the origins of Hispano-Portuguese commercial expansion. Writing the history of the 13th century to the 15th and 16th centuries, he contrasted Italo-Mediterranean Europe (the coast from Genoa to Venice) to the Iberian Peninsula. European Mediterranean commerce focused on the Oriental spice trade while in the Iberian Peninsula a focus toward the Atlantic developed in three agricultural and maritime centers: Basque Country, Portugal, and the Guadalquivir Valley.

He helped to introduce to Portugal a modern version of economic and social history, according to principles enunciated by Henri Berr and Fernand Braudel. Magalhães Godinho preferred to turn away from a strictly event-driven or biographically-oriented history (such as a biography of the prince Henry the Navigator) to try to draw the social and cultural picture of an era and a milieu. His supporters believe that he broke with the narrow conservatism and ignorance of the political, economic and social sciences that marked Portuguese historiography before his works.

== Selected publications ==
- Documentos sobre a expansão portuguesa, 3 vols, 1943,1945,1956
- A crise da História e as suas novas directrizes, 1947
- Prix et monnaies au Portugal (1750-1850), 1955
- A economia dos descobrimentos Henriquinos, 1962
- Portugal and her empire 1648–1720, in the series New Cambridge Modern History, vols V & VI, 1961 & 1970
- Introdução às Ciências Sociais, 1964
- L´économie de l´empire Portugais aux XVe-XVIe siècles (1958), 1969
- Os descobrimentos e a economia mundial, 2 vols, 1963-1970 (2nd ed. corrected & extended, 4 vols, 1982–1983)
- Ensaios de História de Portugal, 1967 (2nd ed. extended, 1978)
- A estrutura da antiga sociedade portuguesa, 1971
- Humanismo científico e reflexão filosófica: ensaios, 1971
- Les finances de l´État Portugais des Indes Orientales (1516-1636), 1982 (1958)
- Mito e mercadoria, utopia e prática de navegar (séculos XIII-XVIII), 1990
- Le devisement du monde: de la pluralité des espaces à l´espace global de l´humanité (XVe-XVIe siècles), 2000
- Portugal: a emergência de uma Nação, 2004
