= Maria João Bustorff =

Portuguese politician

Maria João Bustorff GOM

Minister of Culture
- In office 17 July 2004 – 12 March 2005
- Prime Minister: Pedro Santana Lopes
- Preceded by: Pedro Roseta
- Succeeded by: Isabel Pires de Lima

Personal details
- Born: Maria João Espírito Santo Bustorff Silva; 13 August 1950 (age 76) Lisbon, Portugal
- Party: Social Democratic Party
- Spouse(s): José Luís de Castro Caldas (divorced); António Lobo Antunes (divorced)
- Education: Technical University of Lisbon

Maria João Espírito Santo Bustorff Silva GOM is a Portuguese restoration specialist, philanthropist and former politician. She is known for her historical and cultural restoration and preservation work in both Portugal and Brazil through the Ricardo Espírito Santo Foundation, and also for being Minister of Culture during the government of Prime Minister Pedro Santana Lopes.

== Biography ==
Maria João Espírito Santo Bustorff was born on 13 August 1950 in Lisbon, Portugal to António Sérgio Carneiro Bustorff Silva and Ana Maria da Anunciação de Fátima de Morais Sarmento Cohen do Espírito Santo Silva. In 1973, she obtained a degree in social and political sciences from the Universidade Técnica de Lisboa and then taught sociology at the Universidade Nova de Lisboa. In 1987, she joined the executive board of the Ricardo Espírito Santo Foundation, which operates facilities in Portugal and Brazil including a museum, two schools—the Institute of Art and Crafts and the School of Decorative Arts—and restoration workshops. All are involved in preservation of crafts and restoration of furniture and furnishings.

Bustorff expanded the work of the Foundation, which until she joined had been limited to Portugal, into Brazil, hoping to protect and conserve Portuguese heritage throughout the world. One of her first projects there was restoration of the Franciscan Monastery of St. Anthony Church in Igarassu, Pernambuco. The project earned the backing of the European Union's cultural division to protect heritage and at the time was the only organization trying to protect the Baroque art heritage in Latin America. For her work, in 1998 she was awarded the National Cross of the South from Brazil and a few months later received the Order of Merit from Portugal as Grand Officer.

She continued working in Brazil and expanded into the states of Bahia, Minas Gerais, Pará, Pernambuco, Rio de Janeiro and São Paulo, working closely with the Ministry of Culture of Brazil to preserve Brazil's historical and artistic heritage.

In July 2004, Bustorff was chosen by Pedro Santana Lopes to become Minister of Culture in his government. Her choice was widely considered as a surprise. The government would resign some months later, and after leaving her post she joined the Board of Arqueonautas Worldwide.

== Orders of Merit ==
- 10 March 1998, National Cross of the South, Brazil
- 9 June 1998, Grand Officer of the Order of Merit, Portugal
- 3 January 2001, Grand Cross of the Order of Cultural Merit, Brazil
- 30 December 2004, Collar of the Centennial of São Paulo, Brazil
- 31 January 2005, Grand Cross of Merit, Italy
- 12 December 2012, Grand official of the National Cross of the South, Brazil

== Sources ==
- Raposo de Sousa Abecassis, José M. (1990). Genealogia hebraica: Beniso-Fresco. Vol. ii (1 ed.). Lisbon, Portugal: Sociedade Industrial Gráfica Telles da Silva. ISBN 978-972-95429-0-9.
