= Government of Portugal =

Body of sovereignty of Portugal

- Governo de Portugal
- Central government
- Government logo

Overview
- Established: 24 September 1834; 192 years ago
- State: Portugal
- Leader: Prime minister
- Appointed by: President
- Main organ: Council of ministers
- Ministries: 17
- Responsible to: Assembly of the Republic
- Headquarters: São Bento Mansion; Estrela, Lisbon
- Website: portugal.gov.pt

The Government of Portugal, also referred to as the Government of the Republic, is one of the four sovereignty bodies of Portugal, together with the president, the assembly of the Republic and the courts. It is both the body of sovereignty that conducts the general politics of the country and the superior body of the Portuguese public administration.

The term "constitutional government" or simply "government" also refers to the team of ministers and its period of management under one prime minister. This concept is similar to an "administration" in the parlance of a presidential republic or to a "collective ministry" in the parlance of some Commonwealth countries. Each government in this sense is identified by a roman number, with the present one (formed in June 2025) being the XXV Constitutional Government since the establishment of the current democratic regime, in 1976.

== Composition ==
The Government comprises the prime minister, ministers and secretaries of state (junior ministers). Governments may also include one or more deputy prime ministers and undersecretaries of state. Each minister usually heads a ministry and has assigned to him or her one or more secretaries of state, while certain governments may also assign one or more minister(s) without portfolio, as well.

== Formation ==
After the elections for the Assembly of the Republic or the resignation of the previous government, the president listens to the parties in the Assembly of the Republic and invites someone to form a government.

The prime minister chooses members of the council of ministers. Then the president swears in the prime minister and the Government.

== Functions ==
The Government has political, legislative and administrative functions. These include, among other things, the power to negotiate with other countries or international organizations, to submit bills to the Assembly of the Republic, to issue decrees and to take administrative choices.

The Government guides its actions by the governmental program and implements it in the state budget that is submitted to the Assembly of the Republic each year, in the laws that it proposes, in the decrees that it issues in the Portuguese Council of Ministers, and in individual decisions made by its members.

There are no guarantees that the government will stick to its government program, but if it fails to do so, its actions will be judged by the citizens in forthcoming elections.

The Government may also be questioned by the other three sovereignty organs: the president of the republic, the Assembly of the Republic and the courts. The president may veto governmental decrees and a government bill may fail to pass in the Assembly of the Republic, where a motion of no confidence may be approved.

== The Council of Ministers ==
The Council of Ministers is a collegial executive body within the Government of Portugal. It is usually presided over by the prime minister, but the president of the republic can preside over it at the prime minister's request. Besides the prime minister, the vice prime ministers and all ministers are members of the Council of Ministers. When the prime minister finds it fit, certain secretaries of state can also attend its meetings, but without being able to vote.

== List of governments (since 1976) ==
Constitutional Governments of Portugal
| Gov | Start | End | Prime minister | Parties in Government | Notes and main political events |
|---|---|---|---|---|---|
| I | 1976-07-23 | 1978-01-23 | Mário Soares | PS | 1976 election (34.9%), minority government, motion of confidence rejection |
| II | 1978-01-23 | 1978-08-29 | Mário Soares | PS + CDS | Coalition government, President Ramalho Eanes dismisses the government |
| III | 1978-08-29 | 1978-11-22 | Alfredo Nobre da Costa | Independent | Nobre da Costa is appointed by President Ramalho Eanes to form government, government resigned |
| IV | 1978-11-22 | 1979-07-07 | Carlos Mota Pinto | Independent | Mota Pinto is appointed by President Ramalho Eanes to form government, prime-minister resigned |
| V | 1979-08-01 | 1980-01-03 | Maria de Lurdes Pintasilgo | Independent | Lurdes Pintasilgo is appointed by President Ramalho Eanes to form a caretaker government, the first and only time a woman has held this position |
| VI | 1980-01-03 | 1981-01-09 | Francisco Sá Carneiro, Diogo Freitas do Amaral (Note: Interim prime minister between 4 December 1980 and 9 January 1981.) | AD (PSD + CDS + PPM) | 1979 election (45.3%); 1980 election (47.6%), Sá Carneiro's death, Diogo Freitas do Amaral (CDS) as interim prime-minister |
| VII | 1981-01-09 | 1981-09-04 | Francisco Pinto Balsemão | AD (PSD + CDS + PPM) | Pinto Balsemão is chosen by his party (PSD) to replace Sá Carneiro, prime-minister resigned |
| VIII | 1981-09-04 | 1983-07-09 | Francisco Pinto Balsemão | AD (PSD + CDS + PPM) | Pinto Balsemão is chosen by his party to become prime-minister again, prime-minister resigned |
| IX | 1983-07-09 | 1985-11-06 | Mário Soares | PS + PSD | 1983 election (36.1% + 27.2%), coalition government (Central Bloc), prime-minister resigned |
| X | 1985-11-06 | 1987-08-17 | Aníbal Cavaco Silva | PSD | 1985 election (29.9%), minority government, motion of no confidence approval |
| XI | 1987-08-17 | 1991-10-31 | Aníbal Cavaco Silva | PSD | 1987 election (50.2%) |
| XII | 1991-10-31 | 1995-10-25 | Aníbal Cavaco Silva | PSD | 1991 election (50.6%) |
| XIII | 1995-10-28 | 1999-10-25 | António Guterres | PS | 1995 election (43.8%), minority government |
| XIV | 1999-10-25 | 2002-04-06 | António Guterres | PS | 1999 election (44.1%), minority government, prime-minister resigned |
| XV | 2002-04-06 | 2004-07-17 | Durão Barroso | PSD + CDS–PP | 2002 election (40.2% + 8.7%), coalition government, prime-minister resigned |
| XVI | 2004-07-17 | 2005-03-12 | Santana Lopes | PSD + CDS–PP | Santana Lopes nominated after Durão Barroso's resignation, parliament dissolved by President Jorge Sampaio, new election called |
| XVII | 2005-03-12 | 2009-10-26 | José Sócrates | PS | 2005 election (45.0%) |
| XVIII | 2009-10-26 | 2011-06-20 | José Sócrates | PS | 2009 election (36.6%), minority government, government resigned |
| XIX | 2011-06-20 | 2015-10-30 | Pedro Passos Coelho | PSD + CDS–PP | 2011 election (38.7% + 11.7%), coalition government |
| XX | 2015-10-30 | 2015-11-26 | Pedro Passos Coelho | PàF (PSD + CDS–PP) | 2015 election (38.6%), minority government, motion of rejection approval |
| XXI | 2015-11-26 | 2019-10-26 | António Costa | PS | President Cavaco Silva appoints the 2015 election second largest party leader, minority government |
| XXII | 2019-10-26 | 2022-03-30 | António Costa | PS | 2019 election (36.3%), minority government, budget rejection |
| XXIII | 2022-03-30 | 2024-04-02 | António Costa | PS | 2022 election (41.4%), prime-minister resigned |
| XXIV | 2024-04-02 | 2025-06-05 | Luís Montenegro | AD (PSD + CDS–PP) | 2024 election (28.8%), minority government, motion of confidence rejection |
| XXV | 2025-06-05 | Incumbent | Luís Montenegro | AD (PSD + CDS–PP) | 2025 election (31.8%), minority government |

== Logos ==
In the last decades, there have been different logos that represent the visual identity of the Government.

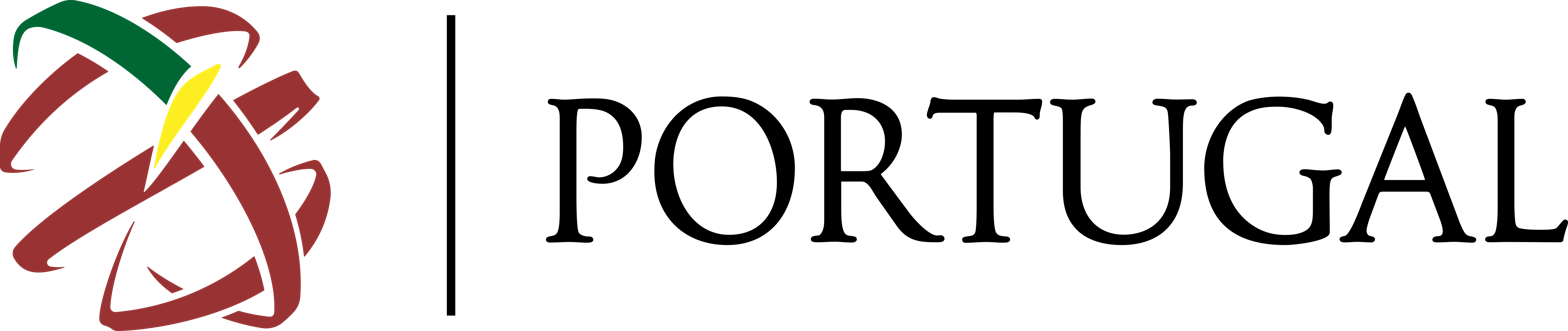
Government logo, 2004–2009

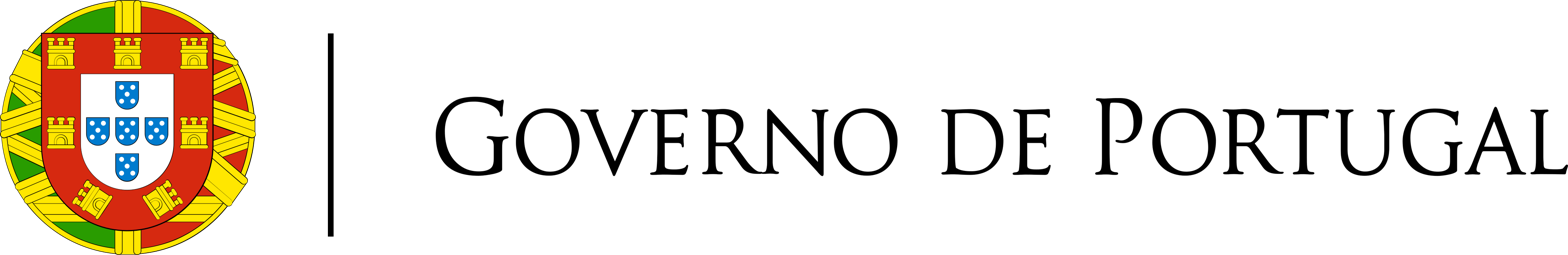
Government logo, 2009–2011

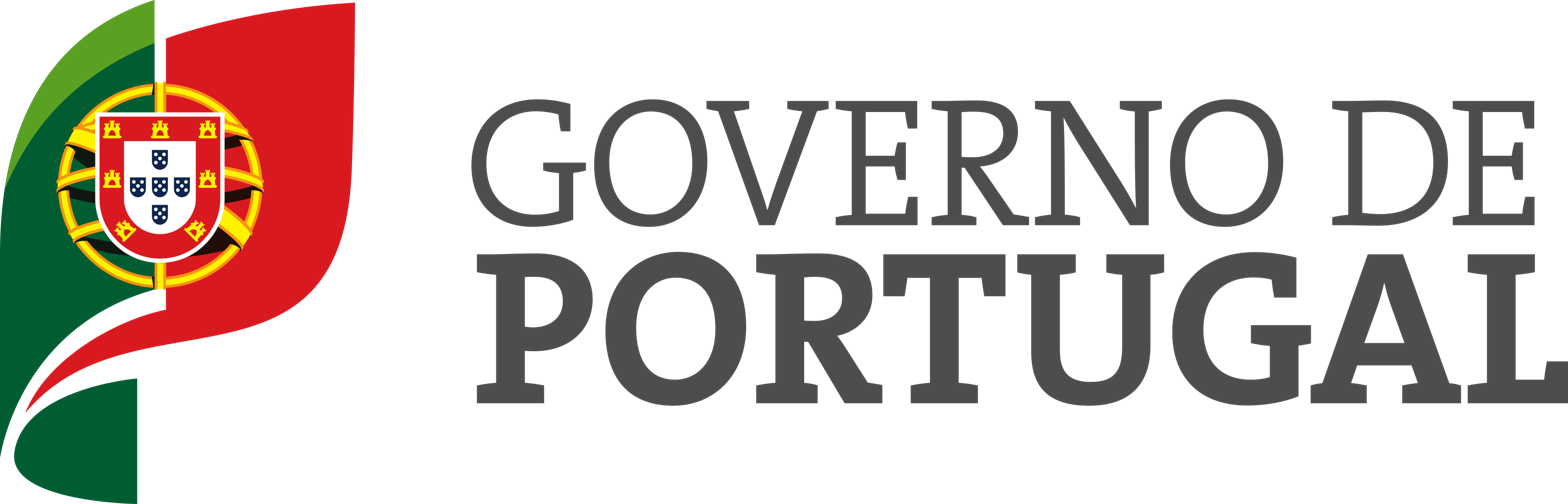
Government logo, 2011–2015

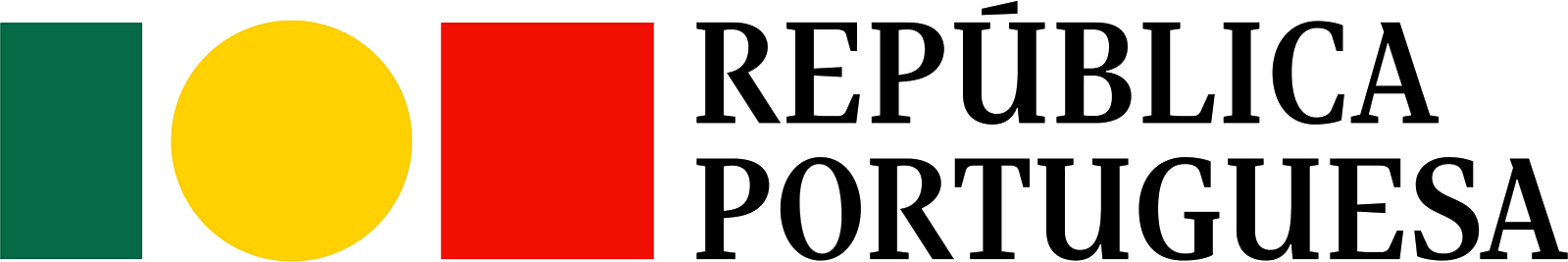
Government logo, 2023–2024

Current logo, since 2024, also used between 2015–2023

== See also ==
- Cabinet (government)
- Ministry (collective executive)
- Politics of Portugal
