= 1986 Portuguese presidential election =

- 26 January 1986 (first round); 16 February 1986 (second round)
- Turnout: 75.39% (first round) ▼9.00pp 77.99% (second round)
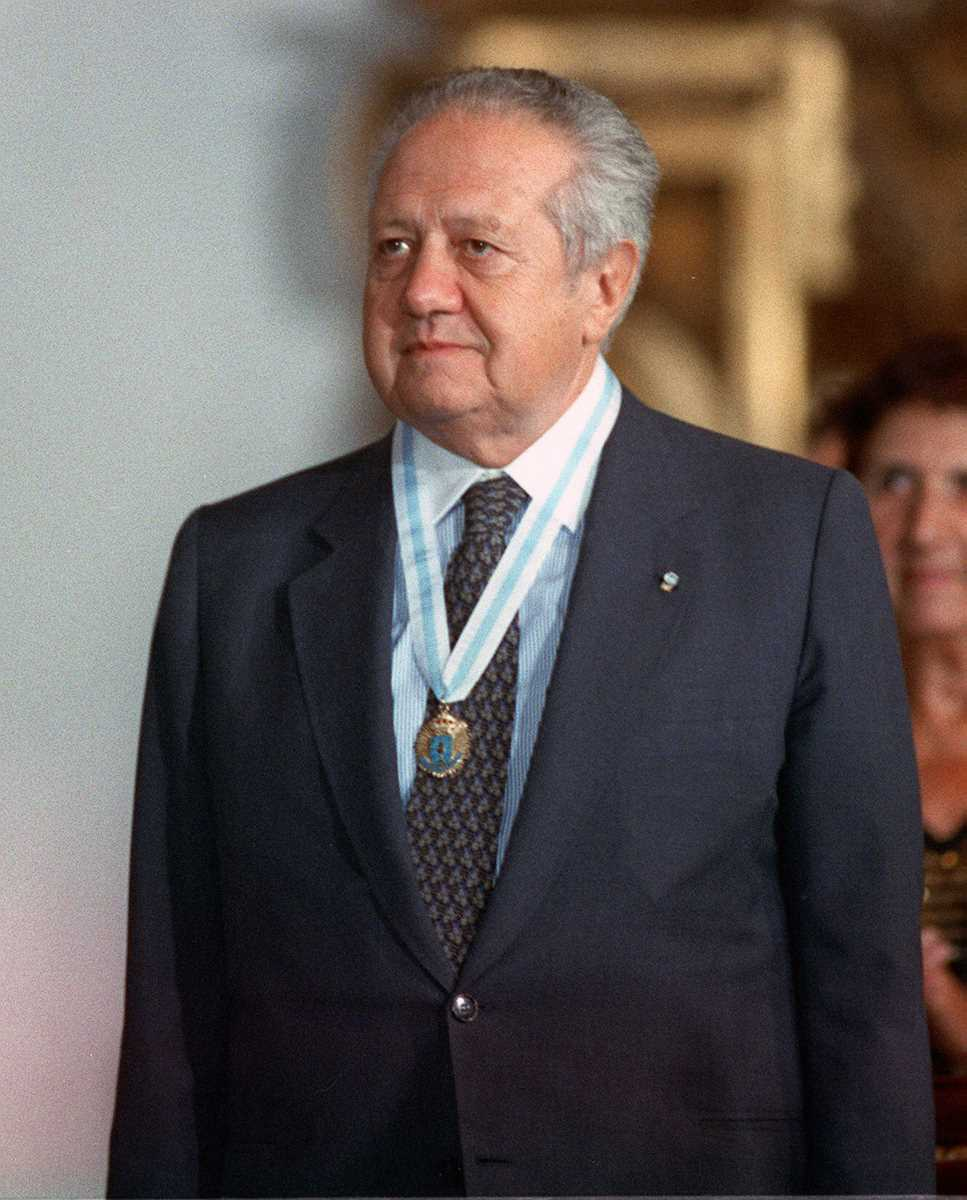

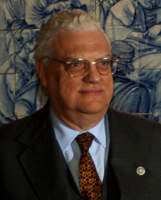
Candidate	Mário Soares	Diogo Freitas do Amaral
Party	PS	CDS Supported by: PSD; PDC
Popular vote	3,010,756	2,872,064
Percentage	51.18%	48.82%

Soares
30-40%
40-50%
50-60%
60-70%
70-80%
80-90%
Amaral
30-40%
40-50%
50-60%
60-70%
70-80%
80-90%
>90%
Zenha
30-40%
40-50%
50-60%
60-70%
President before election
António Ramalho Eanes
Independent
Elected President
Mário Soares
PS

Presidential elections were held in Portugal on 26 January 1986, with a second round on 16 February.

This was closest presidential election ever held in Portugal and was won by the Socialist Mário Soares, who initially had no more than 8 percent in opinion polls.

The first round was easily won by Freitas do Amaral, supported by all the right-wing parties, with 46% of the votes. Soares advanced to the second round, gathering 25% of the votes, by beating the other two left-wing candidates: former prime minister Maria de Lourdes Pintasilgo, the first woman to be a candidate for the Portuguese presidency, however polling at just 7% of the votes, and socialist dissident Salgado Zenha with 21% of the votes. Both candidates, directly or indirectly, supported Soares in the second round. In the first round, Soares did not achieve the majority of the votes in any district, as the left-wing strongholds in the south of Portugal voted for Zenha due to his support from the Communist Party.

As results for the second round were counted, the urban vote, traditionally more left-wing, overcame the early lead of Freitas do Amaral, with Soares narrowly winning by a 51 to 49 percent margin, less than 140,000 votes difference, and with the map showing a clear North-South divide. Voter turnout was strong in both rounds, 75% and 78%, respectively. Mário Soares was sworn in as president on 9 March 1986, the first civilian to hold the post (not counting caretakers) in 60 years. From 1986 until 2006, the PS supported candidates won every presidential election in Portugal.

For 40 years this would be the only time a direct Portuguese presidential election was decided in a runoff, until 2026.

== Background ==
After being re-elected with 56% of the votes in December 1980, president António Ramalho Eanes was constitutionally barred from running for a third term. Like in his first term, Eanes second term as president was marked by deep economic and social problems, and government instability. Following the death of prime minister Sá Carneiro, just days before his re-election, Eanes nominated the incumbent center-right Democratic Alliance's (AD) choice for prime minister, Francisco Pinto Balsemão. Just like with Sá Carneiro, Eanes had a very bad relationship with Balsemão and, later, also with Soares, aggravated by a constitutional reform in 1982 aimed to remove powers from the president. Balsemão resigned in late 1982, and Eanes refused to nominate a new PSD prime minister, deciding to dissolve parliament and call an election. The election, on 25 April 1983, resulted in a PS minority win, with Mário Soares forming a coalition with the PSD, called the Central Bloc, being forced to request a new tough and difficult bailout from the IMF to save the country's finances. By the end of Eanes' term as head of state, Portugal became a full member of the European Economic Community, while the president's influence in the party system increased, with the creation of the Eanist inspired Democratic Renewal Party (PRD), which achieved a surprisingly strong third place in the October 1985 legislative election.

=== Pre-campaign ===
In the follow-up for the presidential election, several prominent figures were mentioned as potential presidential candidates. Former prime minister Maria de Lourdes Pintasilgo was seen as a strong contender, leading several polls until late 1985, announcing her candidacy during the summer of 1985, and hoping for the backing from president Eanes, something that was subsequently thwarted. (Note: Eanes would later endorse Francisco Salgado Zenha.) Prime Minister Soares' candidacy was also the subject of much speculation, with him preparing it himself and expecting the support from the PSD, given the Central Bloc coalition. However, the PSD was deeply divided on this issue, having no strategy or candidate, following the refusal of general Firmino Miguel, and being split between supporting Soares or Diogo Freitas do Amaral. The election of Aníbal Cavaco Silva as party leader, in May 1985, ended any chance of the PSD supporting Soares, with Cavaco officially announcing the party's support for Freitas do Amaral.

== Electoral system ==
Any Portuguese citizen over 35 years old has the opportunity to run for president. In order to do so it is necessary to gather between 7,500 and 15,000 signatures and submit them to the Portuguese Constitutional Court.

According to the Portuguese Constitution, a candidate needs a majority of votes to become elected. If no candidate gets this majority a second round will take place between the two most voted candidates.

== Candidates ==
=== Official candidates ===
==== Advanced to runoff ====
Candidate	Party support	Political office(s)	Details
Mário Soares (61)	Socialist Party	Prime Minister (1976–1978; 1983–1985); Secretary-general of the Socialist Party (1973–1985); Minister without portfolio (1975); Minister of Foreign Affairs (1974–1975); Member of the Assembly of the Republic (1975–1986)	Socialist Party (PS) founder; lawyer.
Diogo Freitas do Amaral (44)	Democratic and Social Centre Social Democratic Party Christian Democratic Party	Deputy Prime Minister (1980–1981; 1981–1983); Minister of National Defence (1981–1983); Minister of Foreign Affairs (1980–1981); President of the Democratic and Social Center (1974–1983); Member of the Assembly of the Republic (1975–1983)	Democratic and Social Center (CDS) founder; university professor.

==== Eliminated in first round ====
Candidate	Party support	Political office(s)	Details
Francisco Salgado Zenha (62)	Democratic Renewal Party Portuguese Communist Party Portuguese Democratic Movement	Minister of Finance (1975–1976); Minister of Justice (1974–1975); President of the Socialist Party's parliamentary group (1976–1983); Member of the Assembly of the Republic (1975–1983)	Independent, former Socialist Party (PS) founding member; lawyer; endorsed by President António Ramalho Eanes.
Maria de Lourdes Pintasilgo (56)	Popular Democratic Union	Prime Minister (1979–1980); Minister of Social Affairs (1974–1975); Secretary of State for Social Security (1974); Member of the Corporative Chamber (1969–1974)	Independent; engineer.

=== Withdrew candidacy ===
- Ângelo Veloso – incumbent Member of the Assembly of the Republic (1975–1990); supported by the Portuguese Communist Party, left the race to support Salgado Zenha;
- Manuel da Costa Braz – former Minister of Home Affairs (1974–1975; 1976–1978; 1979–1980); former Ombudsman (1975–1976).

=== Unsuccessful candidacies ===
There were also three candidates rejected by the Portuguese Constitutional Court for not complying with the legal requirements:

- Carmelinda Pereira – former Member of the Assembly of the Republic (1975–1979); supported by the Workers' Party of Socialist Unity;
- Luís Carlos Franco;
- Álvaro Manuel Nunes.
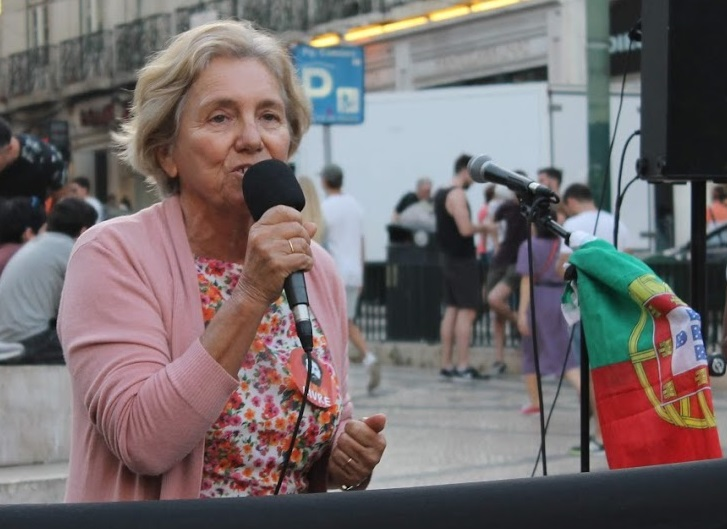
Carmelinda Pereira

=== Declined ===
- Mário Firmino Miguel – general officer, former Defense Minister in 1974 and between 1976 and 1978;
- Daniel Proença de Carvalho – lawyer, former Minister of Social Communication between 1978 and 1979, RTP Chairman between 1980 and 1982. Later became campaign manager for Diogo Freitas do Amaral.

== Campaign period ==
=== Issues ===
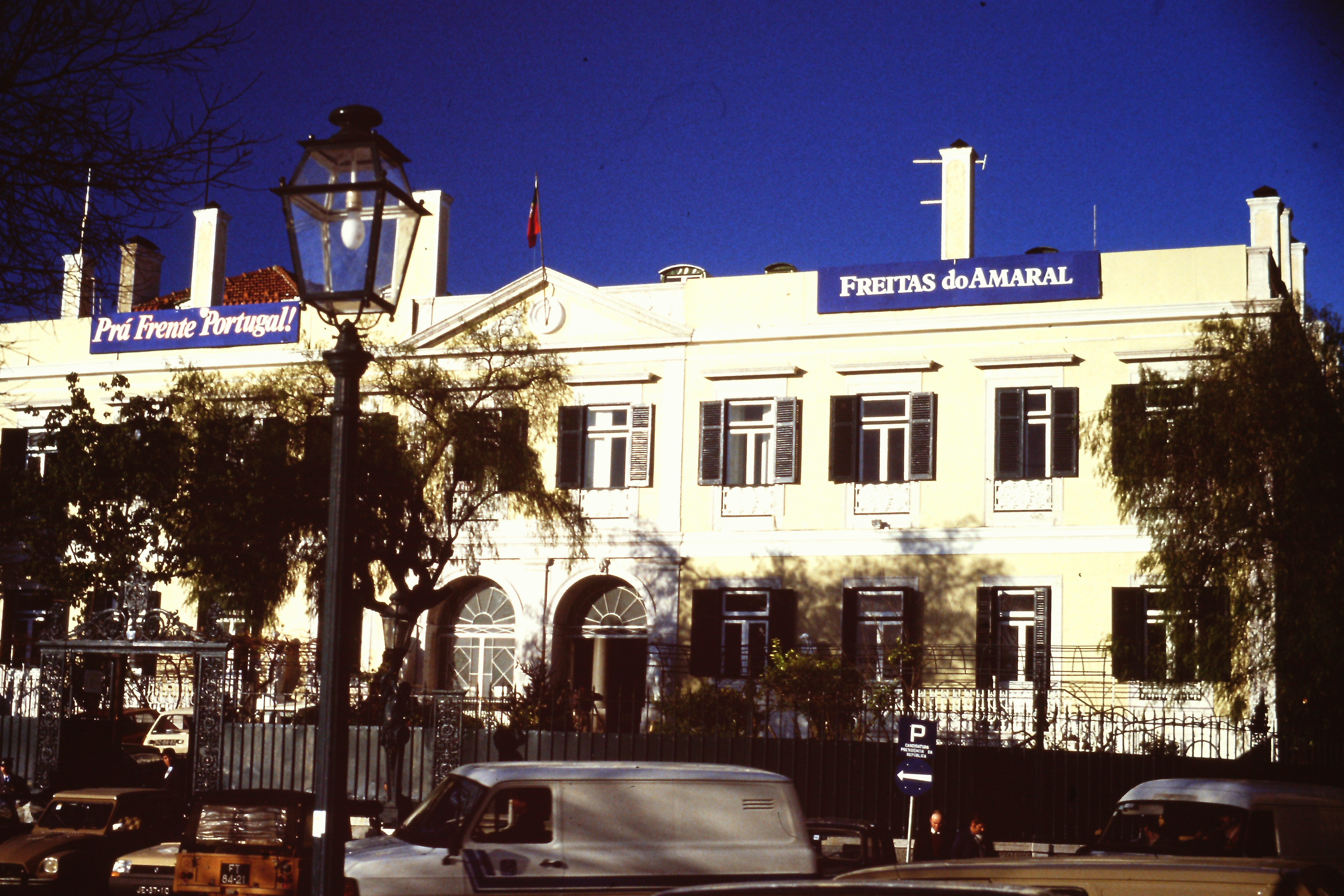
Freitas do Amaral campaign headquarters in Lisbon.

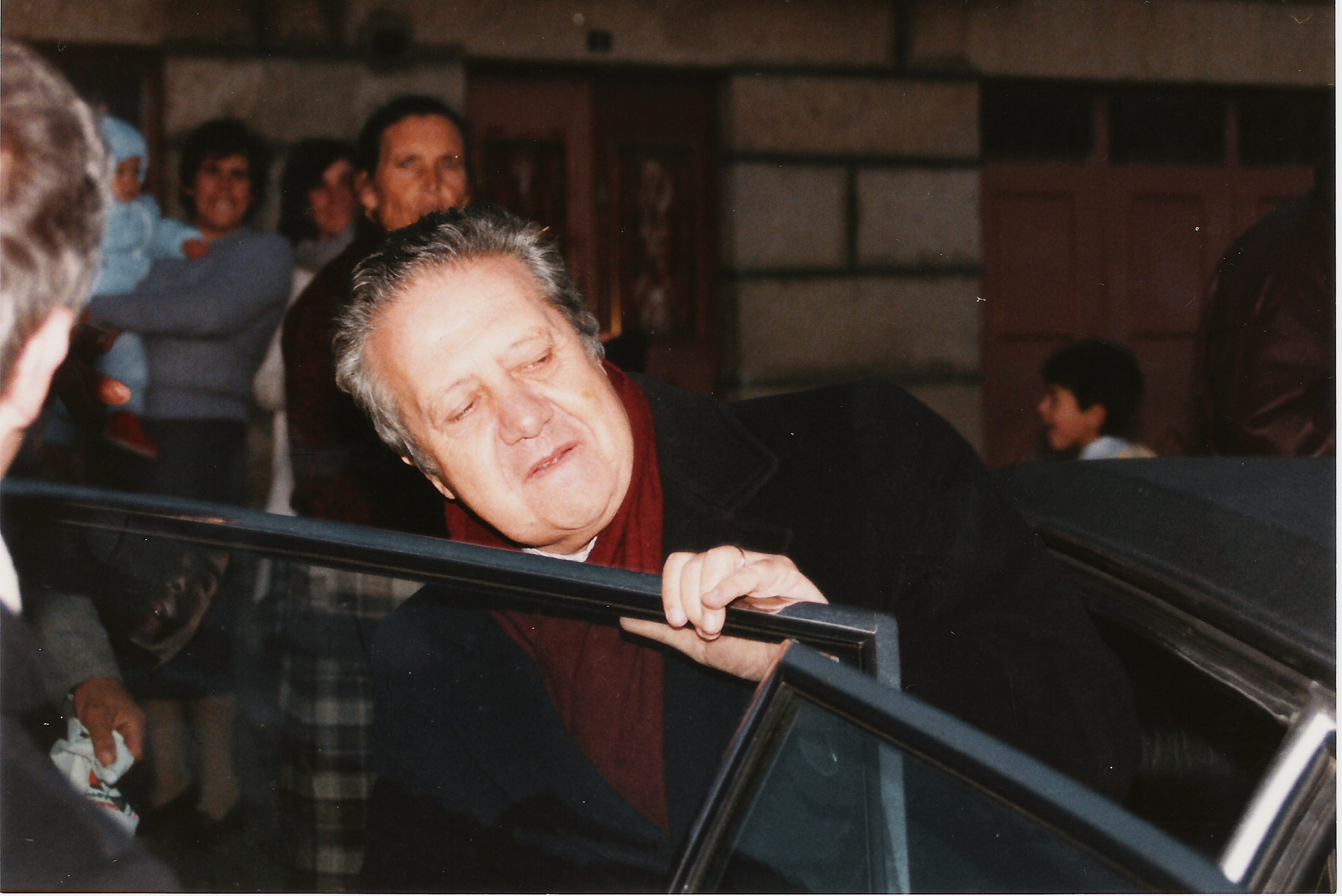
Soares on the campaign trail in Vila Nova de Foz Côa.

The 1986 presidential campaign was one of the most polarizing in Portugal's democratic history. The center-right/right-wing presented a unified candidate, Diogo Freitas do Amaral, while the center-left/left-wing was divided between three candidates: Soares, Salgado Zenha and Pintasilgo. Soares' unpopularity during his term as prime minister, between 1983 and 1985, when several austerity policies were inacted because of the International Monetary Fund bailout leading to one of the worst social crises in Portuguese democracy, plus the long feud between Soares and the Portuguese Communist Party, created a deep divide on the left. Soares' candidacy was further damaged by divisions within the Socialist Party, with his longtime friend and party ally Francisco Salgado Zenha announcing his candidacy with the endorsement of outgoing president António Ramalho Eanes, and later also with the support from the Communists, whose candidate, Ângelo Veloso, withdrew from the race some days before the first round. The tensions on the left side of the political spectrum reached a breaking point on 15 January 1986, when Soares was violently assaulted by Communist supporters in Marinha Grande, a moment that was seen as a turning point in favour of Soares.

On the first round, held on 26 January, Freitas and Soares advanced to a runoff. Soares' passage to the runoff created a dilemma for the Communist Party, taking into account the acrimonious relationship between both. Despite this background, the Communists decided to support Soares in the runoff, with party leader Álvaro Cunhal saying "if necessary, cover [Soares'] face on the ballot with one hand and vote with the other". Freitas' campaign used this support from the PCP to attack Soares, accusing him of contradicting himself by accepting the support of the Communists, while Soares accused Freitas of lack of political awareness before the 25 April 1974 revolution, pointing that Freitas "showed solidarity through silence" for the Estado Novo regime.

=== Party slogans ===
Candidate	Original slogan	English translation	Refs
Mário Soares	« O voto do Povo » « Soares é fixe »	"The vote of the People" "Soares is cool"	
Diogo Freitas do Amaral	« Está na hora! » « Prá Frente Portugal! »	"It's time!" "Go Forward Portugal!"	
Francisco Salgado Zenha	« Justiça e tolerância, confiança no futuro »	"Justice and tolerance, confidence in the future"	
Maria de Lourdes Pintasilgo	« A coragem da decisão »	"The courage of the decision"	

=== Candidates' debates ===
==== First round ====
1986 Portuguese presidential election debates
Date	Organisers	Moderator(s)	P Present A Absent invitee N Non-invitee				
Date	Organisers	Moderator(s)	Soares	Freitas	Zenha	Pintasilgo	Refs
17 Dec 1985	RTP1	Margarida Marante	N	P	P	N	
19 Dec 1985	RTP1	Miguel Sousa Tavares	P	N	N	P	
26 Dec 1985	RTP1	Miguel Sousa Tavares	N	P	N	P	
2 Jan 1986	RTP1	Miguel Sousa Tavares	P	N	P	N	
7 Jan 1986	RTP1	Margarida Marante	N	N	P	P	
9 Jan 1986	RTP1	Miguel Sousa Tavares	P	P	N	N	

==== Second round ====
1986 Portuguese presidential election debates
Date	Organisers	Moderator(s)	P Present A Absent invitee N Non-invitee		
Date	Organisers	Moderator(s)	Soares	Freitas	Refs
4 Feb 1986	RTP1	Margarida Marante; Miguel Sousa Tavares	P	P	

== Endorsements ==
Endorsements from first-round candidates
First-round candidate	First round	Endorsement
Francisco Salgado Zenha	20.88%	Mário Soares
Maria de Lourdes Pintasilgo	7.38%	Against Freitas do Amaral (Note: While not endorsing officially Soares, Pintasilgo refused to vote for Freitas do Amaral.)

=== Party endorsements in the second round ===
Candidate	Parties	Ref.
Diogo Freitas do Amaral	CDS	
Diogo Freitas do Amaral	PSD	
Mário Soares	PS	
Mário Soares	PCP	
Mário Soares	MDP/CDE	
Mário Soares	PRD	

== Opinion polls ==
=== First round ===
Exit poll

Polling firm	Fieldwork date	Sample size	Freitas do Amaral	Mário Soares	Salgado Zenha	Lourdes Pintasilgo	Oth	Lead
Polling firm	Fieldwork date	Sample size	CDS	PS	Ind.	Ind.	Oth	Lead
Election results	26 Jan 1986	—N/a	46.3	25.4	20.9	7.4	—	20.9
Ministry of Justice	26 Jan 1986	—N/a	46.8	25.1	21.1	7.0	—	21.7
RTP	26 Jan 1986	—N/a	43–46	24–27	18–21	9–12	—	19
Norma	30 Dec 1985–5 Jan 1986	800	41.8	21.8	14.1	18.3	4.0	20.0
ZAP	28–29 Dec 1985	830	42.3	17.7	23.3	16.7	—N/a	19.0
Euroexpansão	27 Dec 1985–5 Jan 1986	2,237	42.5	21.5	15.0	21.0	—N/a	21.0
Norma	19–23 Dec 1985	607	31.2	12.1	10.8	22.4	23.2	8.8
Norma	23 Nov 1985	?	38.7	8.3	16.3	22.8	13.9	15.9
Marktest	26–27 Oct 1985	430	29	17	—N/a	24	30	5
Norma	9–17 Oct 1985	604	22.8	19.6	—N/a	35.7	21.9	12.9
Norma	10–16 May 1985	598	33.4	12.9	—N/a	24.1	29.7	9.3
Norma	Apr 1985	?	—N/a	13.6	—N/a	25.5	60.9	11.9
Norma	Apr 1985	?	—N/a	13.8	—N/a	25.4	60.8	11.6
Marktest	1–6 Feb 1985	?	11	8	—N/a	27	54	16
Norma	14–21 Jan 1985	?	—N/a	11.1	1.7	25.0	62.6	11.1
Norma	14–21 Jan 1985	?	—N/a	9.9	3.7	26.4	60.0	13.2
Norma	13–21 Dec 1984	?	—N/a	16.5	—N/a	26.8	56.7	10.3
Norma	13–21 Dec 1984	?	—N/a	17.2	—N/a	25.7	57.0	8.5
Marktest	9–12 Nov 1984	?	—N/a	13.0	—N/a	23.6	63.4	10.6
Norma	Nov 1984	?	—N/a	12.4	—N/a	22.5	65.1	7.3
Norma	Nov 1984	?	—N/a	12.0	—N/a	22.5	65.5	10.5
Euroexpansão	19–25 Oct 1984	816	9.4	14.6	2.6	21.5	51.9	6.9
Norma	4–15 Oct 1984	?	—N/a	14.4	—N/a	15.4	70.2	1.0
Marktest	Oct 1984	?	12	13	1	21	53	8
Marktest	Sep 1984	?	10	13	2	20	55	7
Norma	27 Aug–3 Sep 1984	605	—N/a	8.2	—N/a	18.0	73.8	9.8
Marktest	Aug 1984	?	11	11	3	19	56	8
Norma	Jul 1984	?	—N/a	10.3	—N/a	22.3	67.4	12.0
Marktest	Jul 1984	?	13	12	3	23	49	10
Norma	Jun 1984	?	—N/a	12.4	—N/a	22.0	65.6	9.6
Marktest	8–15 Jun 1984	?	13	11	2	24	50	11
Norma	May 1984	?	—N/a	13.8	—N/a	26.2	60.0	12.4
Marktest	Mar 1984	?	12	10	—N/a	20	42	8
Marktest	4–7 Feb 1984	?	10.5	12.8	—N/a	16.9	59.8	4.1
Damião de Gois	Dec 1983–Feb 1984	?	13.8	12.6	—N/a	22.2	51.4	8.4
Marktest	Jan 1984	?	10.5	12.8	—N/a	16.9	59.8	4.1

=== Second round ===
Exit poll

Polling firm	Fieldwork date	Sample size	Freitas	Soares	Lead
Polling firm	Fieldwork date	Sample size	CDS	PS	Lead
Election results	16 Feb 1986	—N/a	48.8	51.2	2.4
Ministry of Justice	16 Feb 1986	—N/a	48.7	51.3	2.6
RTP	16 Feb 1986	—N/a	48–50	50–52	2
Norma	1 Feb 1986	?	52.6	47.4	5.2
ZAP	28–29 Dec 1985	830	60.3	39.7	20.6
Euroexpansão	27 Dec 1985–5 Jan 1986	2,237	58.8	41.2	17.6
Norma (Note: Results presented here exclude undecideds (31.2%). With their inclusion results are: Freitas do Amaral: 40.4%; Mário Soares: 28.4%;)	19–23 Dec 1985	607	58.7	41.3	17.4
Norma (Note: Results presented here exclude undecideds (37.0%). With their inclusion results are: Freitas do Amaral: 42.0%; Mário Soares: 21.0%;)	10–16 May 1985	598	66.7	33.3	33.4
Norma (Note: Results presented here exclude undecideds (54.2%). With their inclusion results are: Freitas do Amaral: 23.3%; Mário Soares: 22.5%;)	Apr 1985	?	50.9	49.1	1.8

Hypothetical polling

Polling firm	Date conducted	Sample size	Mário Soares	Freitas do Amaral	Salgado Zenha	Lourdes Pintasilgo	Alberto João Jardim	Firmino Miguel	Lucas Pires	Oth/ Und	Lead
Polling firm	Date conducted	Sample size	PS	CDS	Ind.	Ind.	PSD	Ind.	CDS	Oth/ Und	Lead
ZAP	28–29 Dec 1985	830	—N/a	54.4	45.6	—N/a	—N/a	—N/a	—N/a	—N/a	8.8
ZAP	28–29 Dec 1985	830	—N/a	55.1	—N/a	44.9	—N/a	—N/a	—N/a	—N/a	10.2
Euroexpansão	27 Dec 1985–5 Jan 1986	2,237	57.8	—N/a	42.2	—N/a	—N/a	—N/a	—N/a	—N/a	15.6
Euroexpansão	27 Dec 1985–5 Jan 1986	2,237	52.7	—N/a	—N/a	47.3	—N/a	—N/a	—N/a	—N/a	5.4
Euroexpansão	27 Dec 1985–5 Jan 1986	2,237	—N/a	59.9	40.1	—N/a	—N/a	—N/a	—N/a	—N/a	19.8
Euroexpansão	27 Dec 1985–5 Jan 1986	2,237	—N/a	52.7	—N/a	47.3	—N/a	—N/a	—N/a	—N/a	5.4
Euroexpansão	27 Dec 1985–5 Jan 1986	2,237	—N/a	—N/a	44.3	55.7	—N/a	—N/a	—N/a	—N/a	11.4
Norma	19–23 Dec 1985	607	31.7	—N/a	28.8	—N/a	—N/a	—N/a	—N/a	39.5	2.9
Norma	19–23 Dec 1985	607	30.2	—N/a	—N/a	38.3	—N/a	—N/a	—N/a	31.5	8.1
Norma	19–23 Dec 1985	607	—N/a	44.1	30.2	—N/a	—N/a	—N/a	—N/a	25.7	13.9
Norma	19–23 Dec 1985	607	—N/a	40.4	—N/a	39.4	—N/a	—N/a	—N/a	20.2	1.0
Norma	19–23 Dec 1985	607	—N/a	—N/a	18.4	37.5	—N/a	—N/a	—N/a	44.1	19.1
Marktest	26–27 Oct 1985	430	—N/a	35	—N/a	39	—N/a	—N/a	—N/a	26	4
Norma	9–17 Oct 1985	604	26.7	—N/a	—N/a	44.3	—N/a	—N/a	—N/a	29.0	17.6
Norma	9–17 Oct 1985	604	—N/a	27.1	—N/a	48.6	—N/a	—N/a	—N/a	24.3	21.5
Norma	10–16 May 1985	598	31.6	—N/a	—N/a	31.7	—N/a	—N/a	—N/a	36.7	0.1
Norma	10–16 May 1985	598	—N/a	41.2	—N/a	33.6	—N/a	—N/a	—N/a	25.2	7.6
Norma	Apr 1985	?	21.1	—N/a	—N/a	31.0	—N/a	—N/a	—N/a	47.9	9.9
Norma	Apr 1985	?	23.2	—N/a	—N/a	—N/a	23.6	—N/a	—N/a	53.2	0.4
Norma	Apr 1985	?	21.2	—N/a	—N/a	—N/a	—N/a	17.8	—N/a	61.0	3.4
Euroexpansão	19–25 Oct 1984	816	34.0	—N/a	23.6	—N/a	—N/a	—N/a	—N/a	42.4	10.4
Euroexpansão	19–25 Oct 1984	816	27.9	—N/a	—N/a	—N/a	—N/a	—N/a	31.8	40.3	3.9
Marktest	8–15 Jun 1984	?	—N/a	35	—N/a	43	—N/a	—N/a	—N/a	22	8
Marktest	Mar 1984	?	—N/a	24	—N/a	45	—N/a	—N/a	—N/a	31	21

== Results ==
=== National summary ===
Candidate	Party	First round		Second round	
Candidate	Party	Votes	%	Votes	%
Diogo Freitas do Amaral	Democratic Social Center (Note: Also supported by the Social Democratic Party and the Christian Democratic Party.)	2,629,597	46.31	2,872,064	48.82
Mário Soares	Socialist Party	1,443,683	25.43	3,010,756	51.18
Francisco Salgado Zenha	Independent (Note: Supported by the Democratic Renewal Party, the Portuguese Communist Party and the Portuguese Democratic Movement.)	1,185,867	20.88		
Maria de Lourdes Pintasilgo	Independent (Note: Supported by the Popular Democratic Union.)	418,961	7.38		
Total		5,678,108	100.00	5,882,820	100.00
Valid votes		5,678,108	98.87	5,882,820	99.09
Invalid votes		18,292	0.32	20,436	0.34
Blank votes		46,334	0.81	33,844	0.57
Total votes		5,742,734	100.00	5,937,100	100.00
Registered voters/turnout		7,617,257	75.39	7,612,633	77.99
Source: Comissão Nacional de Eleições, First round Second round

=== Results by district ===
==== First round ====
District	Freitas		Soares		Zenha		Pintasilgo		Turnout
District	Votes	%	Votes	%	Votes	%	Votes	%	Turnout
Aveiro	200,008	57.00%	102,684	29.26%	30,868	8.80%	17,345	4.94%	76.06%
Azores	61,274	58.57%	32,841	26.23%	8,235	6.94%	4,586	3.87%	61.50%
Beja	22,648	21.30%	19,347	18.19%	58,233	54.76%	6,117	5.75%	71.58%
Braga	206,747	52.74%	112,263	28.64%	52,751	13.46%	20,218	5.16%	78.95%
Bragança	60,868	66.02%	22,972	24.92%	6,125	6.64%	2,234	2.42%	66.29%
Castelo Branco	72,295	53.00%	31,812	23.32%	24,671	18.09%	7,638	5.60%	72.77%
Coimbra	113,913	46.12%	78,894	32.23%	33,429	13.66%	19,570	7.99%	71.39%
Évora	31,613	27.71%	15,734	13.79%	60,061	52.65%	6,665	5.84%	78.88%
Faro	77,570	40.57%	51,410	26.89%	48,564	25.40%	13.644	7.14%	73.25%
Guarda	71,902	62.94%	29,625	25.93%	9,007	7.88%	3,704	3.24%	69.85%
Leiria	145,554	60.26%	55,653	23.04%	26,816	11.10%	13,525	5.60%	74.48%
Lisbon	512,158	39.91%	296,395	23.09%	338,470	26.37%	136,397	10.63%	78.45%
Madeira	74,688	62.96%	31,123	26.23%	8,235	6.94%	4,586	3.87%	69.34%
Portalegre	28,961	32.42%	22,024	24.66%	33,137	37.10%	5,196	5.82%	78.05%
Porto	413,407	45.17%	284,250	31.06%	152,919	16.71%	64,566	7.06%	79.05%
Santarém	117,657	43.10%	61,661	22.59%	68,133	24.96%	25,522	9.35%	75.99%
Setúbal	104,122	25.23%	72,116	17.47%	187,907	45.53%	48,600	11.77%	79.07%
Viana do Castelo	81,815	58.92%	32,869	23.64%	14,702	10.59%	9,506	6.85%	72.01%
Vila Real	84,459	63.73%	35,050	26.45%	9,362	7.06%	3,655	2.76%	68.59%
Viseu	147,519	66.20%	54,344	24.39%	14,378	6.45%	6,584	2.95%	70.18%
Source: SGMAI Presidential Election Results

==== Second round ====
District	Soares		Freitas		Turnout
District	Votes	%	Votes	%	Turnout
Aveiro	152,472	41.21%	217,352	58.79%	79.95%
Azores	44,464	40.55%	65,177	59.45%	79.95%
Beja	82,278	75.98%	26,015	24.02%	72.76%
Braga	190,746	46.42%	220,150	53.58%	82.77%
Bragança	32,196	32.28%	67,531	67.72%	72.40%
Castelo Branco	65,986	45.66%	78,534	54.34%	76.37%
Coimbra	137,735	52.79%	123,192	47.21%	76.01%
Évora	79,552	69.49%	34,920	30.51%	79.37%
Faro	113,089	56.81%	85,961	43.19%	75.50%
Guarda	44,187	36.10%	78,217	63.90%	74.93%
Leiria	94,791	37.29%	159,401	62.71%	78.16%
Lisbon	736,144	56.74%	561,189	43.26%	79.26%
Madeira	47,776	37.31%	80,290	62.69%	74.22%
Portalegre	59,550	65.25%	31,712	34.75%	79.68%
Porto	510,335	53.53%	443,050	46.47%	82.24%
Santarém	153,084	54.33%	128,675	45.67%	77.95%
Setúbal	289,199	70.88%	118,790	29.12%	78.44%
Viana do Castelo	56,176	38.41%	90,094	61.59%	75.33%
Vila Real	49,210	34.72%	92,505	65.28%	73.05%
Viseu	76,380	32.07%	161,793	67.93%	75.15%
Source: SGMAI Presidential Election Results

=== Maps ===
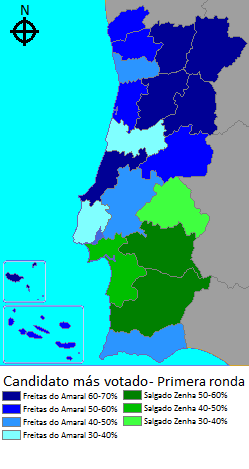
Most voted candidate by district - 1st Round.

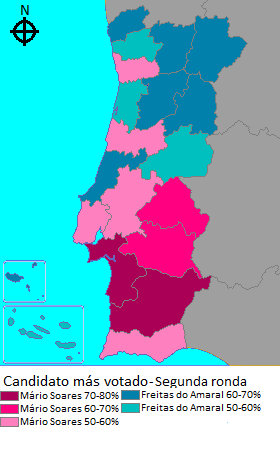
Most voted candidate by district - 2nd Round.

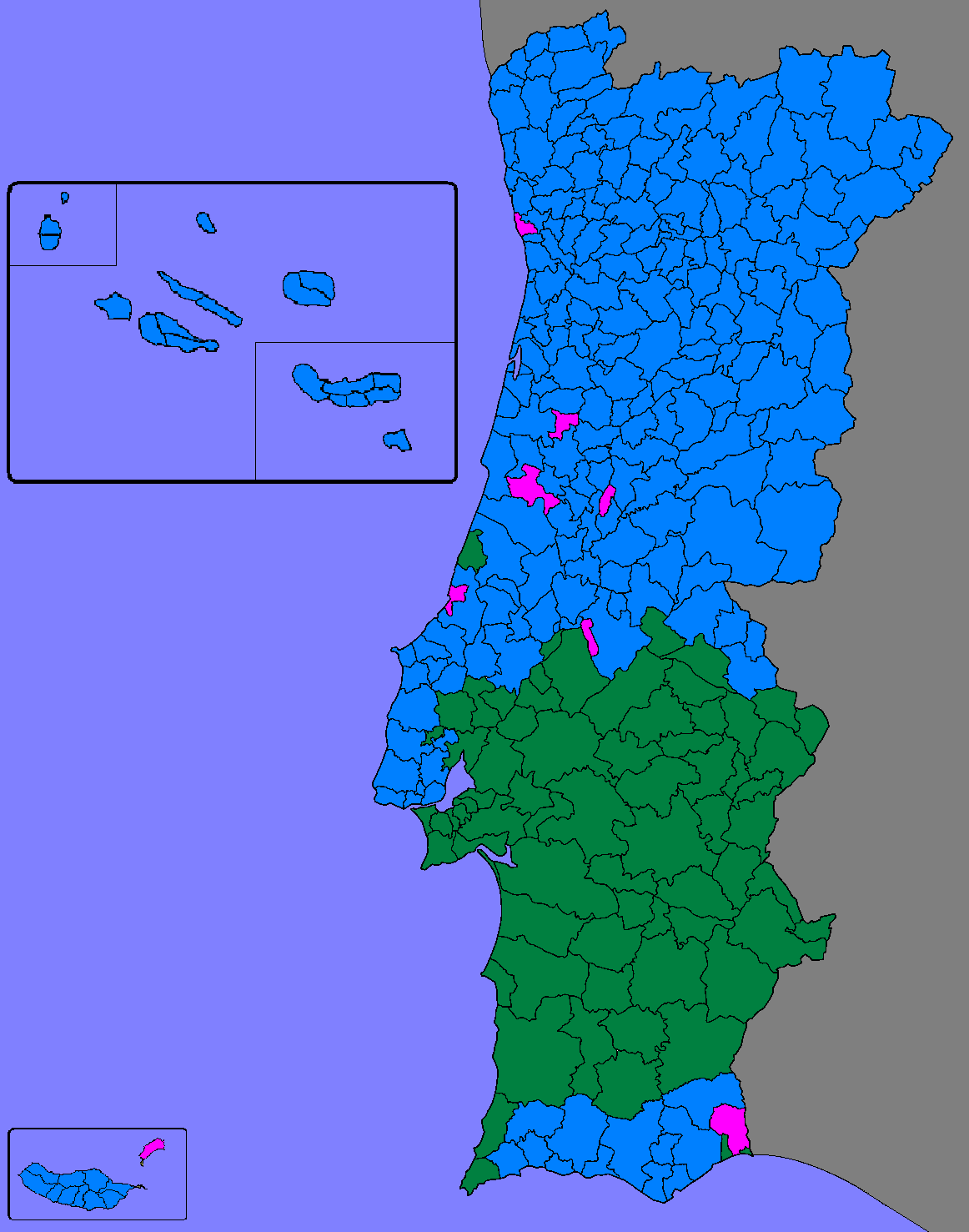
Strongest candidate by municipality - 1st Round.

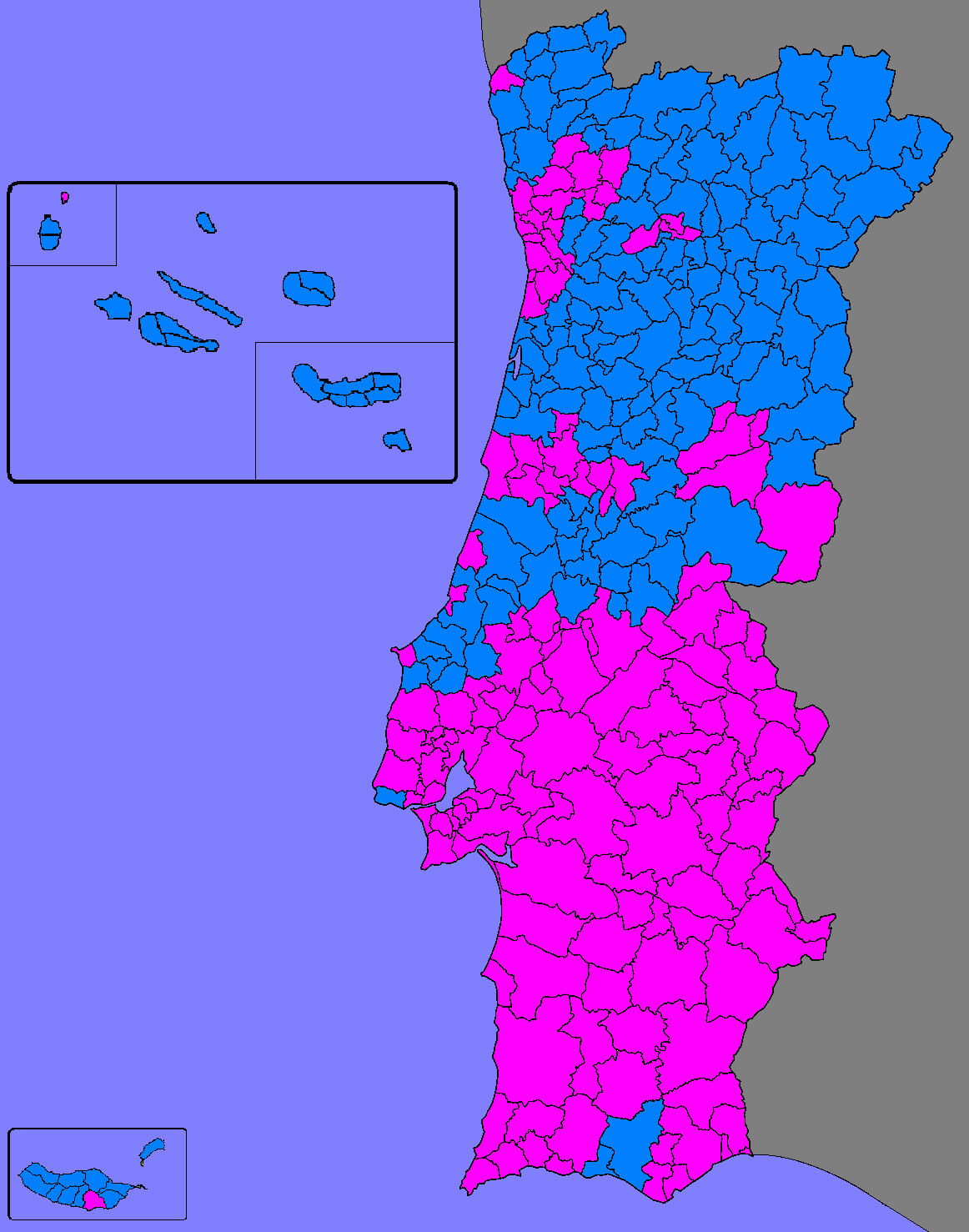
Strongest candidate by municipality - 2nd Round.
