= Soares cabinet =

Soares cabinet may refer to one of the following governments of Portugal led by Mário Soares:

- I Constitutional Government of Portugal (1976–1978)
- II Constitutional Government of Portugal (1978)
- IX Constitutional Government of Portugal (1983–1985)
