= 5th Constitutional Government of Portugal =

Cabinet of Portugal between 1979 and 1980, led by Maria de Lourdes Pintasilgo

V Constitutional Government of Portugal
- Cabinet of Portugal

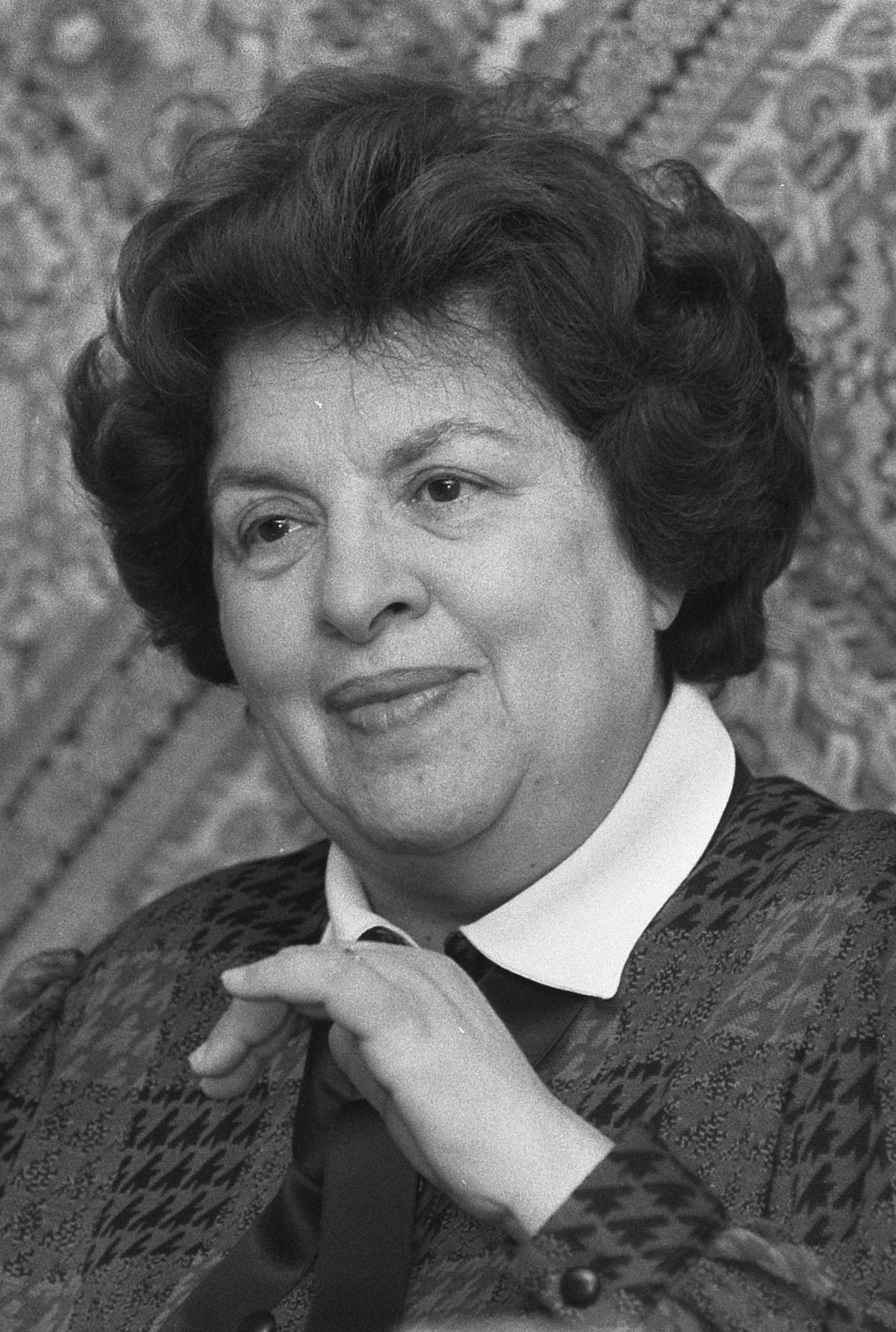
- Prime Minister Maria de Lourdes Pintasilgo
- Date formed: 1 August 1979
- Date dissolved: 3 January 1980

People and organisations
- President of the Republic: António Ramalho Eanes
- Prime Minister: Maria de Lourdes Pintasilgo

History
- Predecessor: IV Constitutional Government of Portugal
- Successor: VI Constitutional Government of Portugal

The V Constitutional Government of Portugal (Portuguese: V Governo Constitucional de Portugal) was the fifth government of the Third Portuguese Republic. It had Maria de Lourdes Pintasilgo as the Prime Minister and lasted for 5 months and 2 days, from 1 August 1979 to 3 January 1980.

== Party breakdown ==
Party breakdown of cabinet ministers by the end of the government's time in office: (Prime Minister not included)

- Independents
18

== Composition ==
The government was composed of the Prime Minister, one Assistant Minister to the Prime Minister, and 15 ministries comprising ministers, secretaries and sub-secretaries of state. The government also included the Ministers of the Republic for the Autonomous Regions of Azores and Madeira.

Ministers of the V Constitutional Government of Portugal
Office	Minister	Party	Start of term	End of term
Prime Minister	Maria de Lourdes Pintasilgo	Independent	1 August 1979	3 January 1980
Assistant Minister to the Prime Minister for Internal Administration	Manuel da Costa Brás	Independent	1 August 1979	3 January 1980
Minister of Social Coordination and Social Affairs	Alfredo Bruto da Costa	Independent	1 August 1979	3 January 1980
Minister of Cultural Coordination, Culture and Science	Adérito Sedas Nunes	Independent	1 August 1979	3 January 1980
Minister of National Defence	José Loureiro dos Santos	Independent	1 August 1979	3 January 1980
Minister of Foreign Affairs	João de Freitas Cruz	Independent	1 August 1979	3 January 1980
Minister of Justice	Paulo de Sousa Machado	Independent	1 August 1979	3 January 1980
Minister of Finance	António de Sousa Franco	Independent	1 August 1979	3 January 1980
Minister of Economic Coordination and Planning	Carlos Corrêa Gago	Independent	1 August 1979	3 January 1980
Minister of Agriculture and Fisheries	Joaquim da Silva Lourenço	Independent	1 August 1979	3 January 1980
Minister of Industry	Fernando Videira	Independent	1 August 1979	3 January 1980
Minister of Commerce and Tourism	Acácio Pereira Magro	Independent	1 August 1979	3 January 1980
Minister of Labour	Jorge Sá Borges	Independent	1 August 1979	3 January 1980
Minister of Transports and Communications	José Marques da Costa	Independent	1 August 1979	3 January 1980
Minister of Housing and Public Works	Mário de Azevedo	Independent	1 August 1979	3 January 1980
Minister of Education	Luís Veiga da Cunha	Independent	1 August 1979	3 January 1980
Minister of Mass Communication	João Figueiredo	Independent	1 August 1979	3 January 1980
Minister of the Republic for the Autonomous Region of Azores	Henrique Afonso da Silva Horta	Independent	1 August 1979	3 January 1980
Minister of the Republic for the Autonomous Region of Madeira	Lino Miguel	Independent	1 August 1979	3 January 1980
