= Henrique Medina Carreira =

Portuguese jurist and financial expert

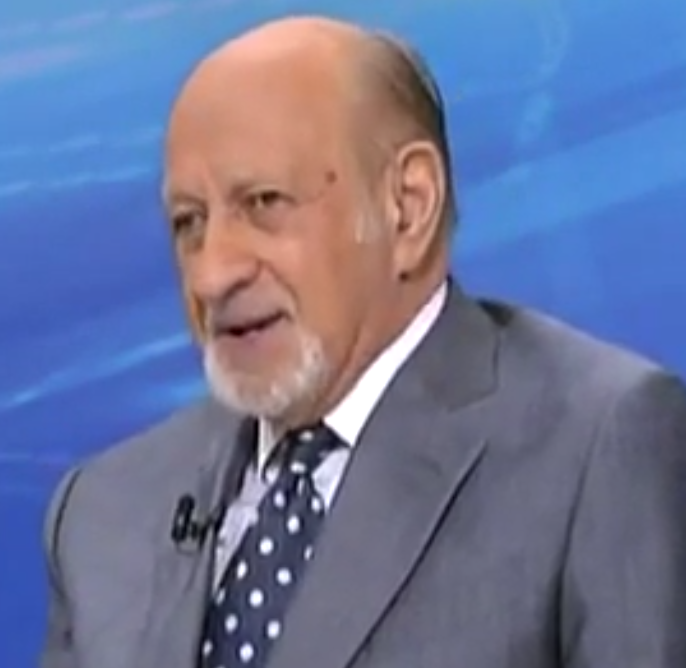

Minister of Finance
- In office 23 July 1976 – 30 January 1978
- Prime Minister: Mário Soares
- Preceded by: Francisco Salgado Zenha
- Succeeded by: Vítor Constâncio

Personal details
- Born: 14 December 1930 Bissau, Portuguese Guinea (present-day Bissau, Guinea-Bissau)
- Died: 3 July 2017 (aged 86) Lisbon, Portugal
- Party: Socialist Party (1973–1978); Independent (1978–2017)
- Children: 1 daughter
- Education: University of Lisbon
- Profession: Jurist, financier, lawyer

Henrique Medina Carreira (14 December 1930 – 3 July 2017) was a Portuguese jurist and financial expert who served as Minister of Finance from 1976 to 1978.

== Biography ==
Medina Carreira was born in Bissau, in what was then the Portuguese overseas territory of Guinea, in 1931. His father was a historian whose hometown was Ilha do Fogo, also in Portuguese Africa. Medina Carreira went to Lisbon where he studied at the Pupilos do Exército military school and obtained a degree in mechanical engineering which in turn allowed him to work at Companhia União Fabril conglomerate's steelworks. He received a degree in law from the University of Lisbon in 1962 and studied economics at the ISEG/Technical University of Lisbon, but did not graduate.

After the Carnation Revolution, in 1975, Pinheiro de Azevedo called him to the Sixth Provisional Government as Undersecretary of State for the Budget, a position he left shortly afterwards to take over the functions of the Minister of Finance in the I Constitutional Government of Portugal. In 1978 he resigned from all his duties in the Portuguese Socialist Party. He left in disagreement on the economic policy adopted by the ruling party.

He worked extensively as a lawyer, business consultant and university professor, and became well known due to the commentaries and opinions he posted in the Portuguese media, such as in the SIC Notícias show Plano Inclinado, warning about the risk of collapse of the Portuguese public finances – an event that would happen in 2011 in the 2010-2012 Portuguese financial crisis.

Medina Carreira died on 3 July 2017 at the age of 86.

== Published works ==
- Manual de Direito Empresarial (1972)
- Esboço Histórico do Regime Fiscal Português entre 1922 e 1980 (1983)
- O Actual Sistema Fiscal Português. Síntese (1983)
- A Fiscalidade e o Mercado Português de Capitais (1983)
- A Situação Fiscal em Portugal (1984)
- Fiscalidade e Administração Local (1984)
- Fiscalidade e Trabalho em Portugal (1984)
- Finanças Públicas e Sistema Fiscal (1985)
- Imposto sobre o Valor Acrescentado: oportunidade, problemas e financiamento da administração local (1985)
- O Volume das Despesas Públicas e Investimento (1986)
- Alguns Aspectos Sociais, Económicos e Financeiros da Fiscalidade Portuguesa (1986)
- Contributo para a Análise da Reforma Fiscal (1988)
- Uma Outra Perspectiva da Reforma Fiscal (1988)
- A Carga Fiscal sobre o Investimento em Portugal e Espanha (1990)
- Concentração de Empresas e Grupos de Sociedades (1992)
- Uma Reforma Fiscal Falhada? (1990), A Família e os Impostos (1995)
- A Tributação do Património (1995)
- Que Reformas, Que Saúde, Que Futuro? (1995)
- As Políticas Sociais em Portugal (1996)
- Projecto da Reforma da Tributação do Património (em co-autoria, 1999)
- Notas sobre o Estado da Nossa Fiscalidade (2000)
- Reformar Portugal – 17 Estratégias de Mudança (em co-autoria, 2002)
- Portugal, Que Futuro? O tempo das mudanças inadiáveis (em co-autoria, 2009)
- O Fim da Ilusão (2011)
- Olhos nos Olhos (em co-autoria com Judite de Sousa, 2012)
