= 1st Constitutional Government of Portugal =

Cabinet of Portugal between 1976 and 1978, led by Mário Soares

1st Constitutional Government
- Cabinet of Portugal

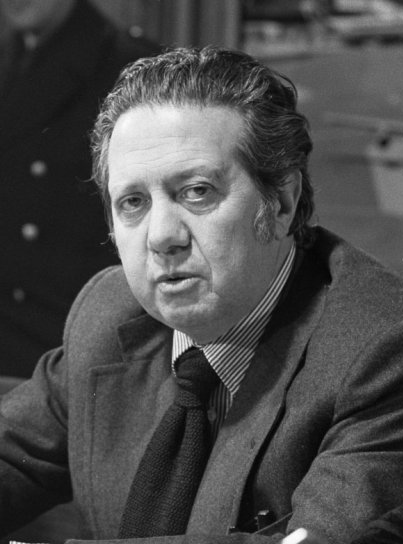
- Prime Minister Mário Soares
- Date formed: 23 July 1976
- Date dissolved: 23 January 1978

People and organisations
- President of the Republic: António Ramalho Eanes
- Prime Minister: Mário Soares
- Member party: Socialist Party (PS)
- Status in legislature: Minority government
- Opposition parties: Democratic People's Party (PPD); Democratic and Social Center (CDS); Portuguese Communist Party (PCP); Popular Democratic Union (UDP)

History
- Election: 1976 Portuguese legislative election (25 April 1976)
- Predecessor: 6th Provisional Government
- Successor: 2nd Constitutional Government

The 1st Constitutional Government (Note: Portuguese: I Governo Constitucional de Portugal) was the first non-provisional government of the Third Portuguese Republic, following the promulgation of the new Constitution of Portugal in April 1976. It had Mário Soares as the Prime Minister and lasted from 23 July 1976 to 23 January 1978.

== Background ==
Following the Carnation Revolution on 25 April 1974, Portugal entered a period of transition to democracy. During this period, which lasted for about two years, several provisional administrations governed the country, starting with the National Salvation Junta, which was followed by six other provisional governments composed of military and civilian members.

On 25 April 1975, one year after the revolution, elections were carried out in Portugal to elect the 250 members of the Constituent Assembly. The main goal of this Constituent Assembly was to write a new Constitution of Portugal to replace the Estado Novo's Constitution of 1933. This assembly had a one-year mandate with no governing functions, as the country continued to be governed by a military-civilian provisional government during the deliberations of the Constituent Assembly. The Socialist Party (PS), with 38% of the votes, was the party with most representation.

The new Constitution of Portugal, drafted over the course of a year, was finally promulgated on 2 April 1976. Immediately after the promulgation, the Constituent Assembly was disbanded.

On 25 April 1976, the first legislative elections were carried out to elect the members of the Assembly of the Republic (the new official name of the Portuguese Parliament) and the new Constitutional Government of Portugal. The Socialist Party won the election with 34.89% of the votes, and got the approval of the President of Portugal António Ramalho Eanes to form a minority government. As the leader of PS, Mário Soares was sworn as Prime Minister, and became the first democratically-elect Prime Minister of the Third Portuguese Republic.

== Party breakdown ==
Party breakdown of cabinet ministers by the end of the government's time in office: (Prime Minister not included)

- Socialist Party
- Independents
12
7

== Composition ==
The government was composed of the Prime Minister, one Minister of State, a Minister without portfolio, and 15 ministries comprising Ministers, Secretaries and Sub-secretaries of State. The government also included the Ministers of the Republic for the Autonomous Regions of Azores and Madeira.

Ministers of the I Constitutional Government of Portugal
Office	Minister	Party	Start of term	End of term
Prime Minister	Mário Soares	PS	23 July 1976	23 January 1978
Minister of State	Henrique de Barros	PS	23 July 1976	23 January 1978
Minister without portfolio	Jorge Campinos	PS	23 July 1976	23 January 1978
Minister of National Defence	Mário Firmino Miguel	Independent	23 July 1976	23 January 1978
Minister of the Economic Plan and Coordination	António Sousa Gomes	PS	23 July 1976	23 January 1978
Minister of the Internal Administration	Manuel da Costa Brás	Independent	23 July 1976	23 January 1978
Minister of Justice	António de Almeida Santos	PS	23 July 1976	23 January 1978
Minister of Finance	Henrique Medina Carreira	PS	23 July 1976	23 January 1978
Minister of Foreign Affairs	José Medeiros Ferreira	PS	23 July 1976	11 October 1977
Minister of Foreign Affairs	Mário Soares	PS	12 October 1977	23 January 1978
Minister of Agriculture and Fisheries	António Lopes Cardoso	PS	23 July 1976	5 November 1976
Minister of Agriculture and Fisheries	António Barreto	PS	5 November 1976	23 January 1978
Minister of Industry and Technology	Walter Rosa	PS	23 July 1976	7 January 1977
Minister of Industry and Technology	António Sousa Gomes	PS	7 January 1977	25 March 1977
Minister of Industry and Technology	Alfredo Nobre da Costa	Independent	25 March 1977	23 January 1978
Minister of Commerce and Tourism	António Barreto	PS	23 July 1976	25 March 1977
Minister of Commerce and Tourism	Carlos Mota Pinto	Independent	25 March 1977	23 January 1978
Minister of Labour	Francisco Marcelo Curto	PS	23 July 1976	25 March 1977
Minister of Labour	António Maldonado Gonelha	PS	25 March 1977	23 January 1978
Minister of Education and Scientific Research	Mário Sottomayor Cardia	PS	23 July 1976	23 January 1978
Minister of Social Affairs	Armando Bacelar	PS	23 July 1976	23 January 1978
Minister of Transports and Communications	Emílio Rui Vilar	PS	23 July 1976	23 January 1978
Minister of Housing, City Planning and Construction	Eduardo Pereira	PS	23 July 1976	23 January 1978
Minister of Public Works	João Almeida Pina	Independent	23 July 1976	23 January 1978
Minister of the Republic for the Autonomous Region of Azores	Octávio Galvão de Figueiredo	Independent	25 March 1977	23 January 1978
Minister of the Republic for the Autonomous Region of Madeira	Lino Miguel	Independent	25 March 1977	23 January 1978

== Dissolution ==
By the second half of 1977, the situation of the Portuguese economy was deteriorating. During the summer of 1977, Prime Minister Mário Soares asked for a loan from the International Monetary Fund (IMF) and several austerity measures were implemented, such as the rise of interest rates, devalue of the escudo and budget cuts. However, the policies were quite unpopular and by late 1977 Soares was facing significant opposition in the Parliament.

In November 1977, Soares proposed a sizeable memorandum between parties and associations to seek common economic and social policies, which was rejected. Because of this rejection, Soares presented a motion of confidence to the Parliament, which he lost by a 59 vote margin. Consequently, Soares announced the dissolution of the government, which took effect on 23 January 1978.
