= Ângelo Veloso =

Portuguese politician (1930–1990)

Ângelo Matos Mendes Veloso (1930–1990; Portuguese pronunciation: [ˈɐ̃ʒɨlu vɨˈlozu]) was a Portuguese politician.

A member of the Portuguese Communist Party since the days of the Estado Novo (New State) dictatorial fascist regime of António de Oliveira Salazar, Veloso was imprisoned in Peniche for political views. He was the communist presidential candidate in the 1986 Presidential Elections, having withdrawn in support of Francisco Salgado Zenha, during the 1st round of the election. He was one of the most prominent figures of the party and was scheduled to succeed Álvaro Cunhal but his premature death in 1990 made it impossible.
