= 3rd Constitutional Government of Portugal =

Cabinet of Portugal in 1978, led by Alfredo Nobre da Costa

III Constitutional Government of Portugal
- Cabinet of Portugal
- Date formed: 29 August 1978
- Date dissolved: 22 November 1978

People and organisations
- President of the Republic: António Ramalho Eanes
- Prime Minister: Alfredo Nobre da Costa
- Member parties: None (support from Democratic People's Party (PPD))
- Opposition parties: Socialist Party (PS); Democratic and Social Center (CDS); Portuguese Communist Party (PCP); Popular Democratic Union (UDP)

History
- Predecessor: II Constitutional Government of Portugal
- Successor: IV Constitutional Government of Portugal

The III Constitutional Government of Portugal (Portuguese: III Governo Constitucional de Portugal) was the third government of the Third Portuguese Republic. It had Alfredo Nobre da Costa as the Prime Minister and lasted from 29 August 1978 to 22 November 1978.

== Party breakdown ==
Party breakdown of cabinet ministers by the end of the government's time in office: (Prime Minister not included)

- Independents
16

== Composition ==
The government was composed of the Prime Minister, one Assistant Minister to the Prime Minister, and 13 ministries comprising ministers, secretaries and sub-secretaries of state. The government also included the Ministers of the Republic for the Autonomous Regions of Azores and Madeira.

Ministers of the III Constitutional Government of Portugal
Office	Minister	Party	Start of term	End of term
Prime Minister	Alfredo Nobre da Costa	Independent	29 August 1978	22 November 1978
Assistant Minister to the Prime Minister	Carlos Costa Freitas	Independent	29 August 1978	22 November 1978
Minister of National Defence	Mário Firmino Miguel	Independent	29 August 1978	22 November 1978
Minister of Finance and Plan	José da Silva Lopes	Independent	29 August 1978	22 November 1978
Minister of the Internal Administration	António Gonçalves Ribeiro	Independent	29 August 1978	22 November 1978
Minister of Justice	Mário Raposo	Independent	29 August 1978	22 November 1978
Minister of Foreign Affairs	Carlos Corrêa Gago	Independent	29 August 1978	22 November 1978
Minister of Agriculture and Fisheries	Apolinário Vaz Portugal	Independent	29 August 1978	22 November 1978
Minister of Industry and Technology	Fernando Santos Martins	Independent	29 August 1978	22 November 1978
Minister of Commerce and Tourism	Pedro Pires de Miranda	Independent	29 August 1978	22 November 1978
Minister of Labour	António da Costa Leal	Independent	29 August 1978	22 November 1978
Minister of Education and Culture	Carlos Lloyd Braga	Independent	29 August 1978	22 November 1978
Minister of Social Affairs	Acácio Pereira Magro	Independent	29 August 1978	22 November 1978
Minister of Transports and Communications	Amílcar Marques	Independent	29 August 1978	22 November 1978
Minister of Housing and Public Works	João Almeida Pina	Independent	29 August 1978	22 November 1978
Minister of the Republic for the Autonomous Region of Azores	Octávio Galvão de Figueiredo	Independent	29 August 1978	25 September 1978
Minister of the Republic for the Autonomous Region of Azores	Henrique Afonso da Silva Horta	Independent	25 September 1978	22 November 1978
Minister of the Republic for the Autonomous Region of Madeira	Lino Miguel	Independent	29 August 1978	22 November 1978
