= 4th Constitutional Government of Portugal =

Cabinet of Portugal between 1978 and 1979, led by Carlos Mota Pinto

IV Constitutional Government of Portugal
- Cabinet of Portugal
- Date formed: 22 November 1978
- Date dissolved: 1 August 1979

People and organisations
- President of the Republic: António Ramalho Eanes
- Prime Minister: Carlos Mota Pinto
- Member parties: None (support from Democratic People's Party (PPD) and Democratic and Social Center (CDS))
- Opposition parties: Socialist Party (PS); Portuguese Communist Party (PCP); Popular Democratic Union (UDP)

History
- Predecessor: III Constitutional Government of Portugal
- Successor: V Constitutional Government of Portugal

The IV Constitutional Government of Portugal (Portuguese: IV Governo Constitucional de Portugal) was the fourth government of the Third Portuguese Republic. It had Carlos Mota Pinto as the Prime Minister and lasted from 22 November 1978 to 1 August 1979.

== Party breakdown ==
Party breakdown of cabinet ministers by the end of the government's time in office: (Prime Minister not included)

- Independents
18

== Composition ==
The government was composed of the Prime Minister, one Deputy Prime Minister, one Assistant Minister to the Prime Minister and 14 ministries comprising ministers, secretaries and sub-secretaries of state. The government also included the Ministers of the Republic for the Autonomous Regions of Azores and Madeira.

Ministers of the IV Constitutional Government of Portugal
| Office | Minister | Party | Start of term | End of term |
|---|---|---|---|---|
| Prime Minister | Carlos Mota Pinto | Independent | 22 November 1978 | 1 August 1979 |
| Deputy Prime Minister for Economic Affairs and European Integration | Manuel Jacinto Nunes | Independent | 22 November 1978 | 1 August 1979 |
| Assistant Minister to the Prime Minister | Álvaro Monjardino | Independent | 22 November 1978 | 1 August 1979 |
| Minister of National Defence | José Loureiro dos Santos | Independent | 22 November 1978 | 1 August 1979 |
| Minister of Finance and Plan | Manuel Jacinto Nunes | Independent | 22 November 1978 | 1 August 1979 |
| Minister of the Internal Administration | António Gonçalves Ribeiro | Independent | 22 November 1978 | 1 August 1979 |
| Minister of Justice | Eduardo Silva Correia | Independent | 22 November 1978 | 1 August 1979 |
| Minister of Foreign Affairs | João de Freitas Cruz | Independent | 22 November 1978 | 1 August 1979 |
| Minister of Agriculture and Fisheries | Apolinário Vaz Portugal | Independent | 22 November 1978 | 1 August 1979 |
| Minister of Industry and Technology | Álvaro Barreto | Independent | 22 November 1978 | 1 August 1979 |
| Minister of Commerce and Tourism | Abel Repolho Correia | Independent | 22 November 1978 | 1 August 1979 |
| Minister of Labour | Eusébio Marques de Carvalho | Independent | 22 November 1978 | 1 August 1979 |
| Minister of Education and Scientific Research | Luís Valente de Oliveira | Independent | 22 November 1978 | 1 August 1979 |
| Minister of Social Affairs | Acácio Pereira Magro | Independent | 22 November 1978 | 1 August 1979 |
| Minister of Transports and Communications | José Marques da Costa | Independent | 22 November 1978 | 1 August 1979 |
| Minister of Housing and Public Works | João Almeida Pina | Independent | 22 November 1978 | 1 August 1979 |
| Minister of Mass Communication | Daniel Proença de Carvalho | Independent | 22 November 1978 | 1 August 1979 |
| Minister of the Republic for the Autonomous Region of Azores | Henrique Afonso da Silva Horta | Independent | 22 November 1978 | 1 August 1979 |
| Minister of the Republic for the Autonomous Region of Madeira | Lino Miguel | Independent | 22 November 1978 | 1 August 1979 |
