= Acácio Pereira Magro =

Portuguese academic, economist, and politician (1932 - 2018)

Minister of Commerce and Tourism
- In office 1 August 1979 – 3 January 1980

Minister of Social Affairs
- In office 29 August 1978 – 1 August 1979

Personal details
- Born: 3 September 1932 Lisbon, Portugal
- Died: 6 April 2018 (aged 85) Lisbon, Portugal
- Education: University of Lisbon
- Occupation: Economist and Politician

Acácio Pereira Magro (3 September 1932 – 6 April 2018) was a Portuguese academic, economist and politician.

Born in Lisbon on 3 September 1932, he studied Economics and Management at the Faculty of Sciences of the University of Lisbon. He was vice-president of the Banco Nacional Ultramarino. He was named Minister of Social Affairs in 1978 by Prime Minister Alfredo Nobre da Costa and later was in Carlos Alberto da Mota Pinto's government. He was appointed Minister of Commerce and Tourism on 1 August 1979 by Prime Minister Maria de Lourdes Pintasilgo.

He died on 6 April 2018 at the age of 85.
