= Jorge Campinos =

Portuguese politician

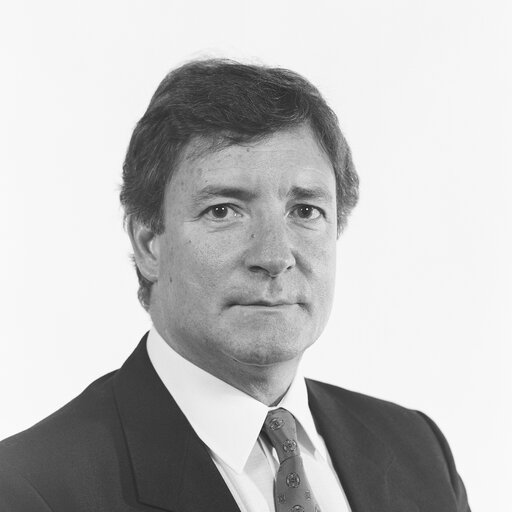
- Official portrait as an MEP, 1986

Personal details
- Born: June 30, 1937 Lobito, Angola
- Died: July 30, 1993 (aged 56) Mozambique
- Party: Socialist Party
- Profession: Politician, Professor

Joaquim Jorge de Pinho Campinos (June 30, 1937, Lobito, Angola – July 30, 1993, Mozambique), was a Portuguese law professor and politician.

== Biography ==
Jorge Campinos was born on June 30, 1937, in Lobito, Angola.

He completed his secondary education at the Lyceum of Sá da Bandeira, Angola, and attended the Faculty of Law at the University of Lisbon.

He was a leader of the House of Students of the Empire (1959–1960).

In 1960, he exiled to France for political reasons.

He graduated from the Faculty of Law and Political Science of the University of Poitiers in Public Law in 1967 and in Political Science in 1968.

He taught at the Faculty of Law and Political Science at the University of Poitiers.

During the political exile in France, which lasted 14 years during the Salazarist dictatorship, he was the international secretary of the Portuguese Socialist Action and clandestinely founded the Socialist Party.

After the April 25th, besides holding various positions in Portuguese Governments, he was elected as a deputy to the Constituent Assembly, deputy to the Assembly of the Republic in two legislatures, judge of the Constitutional Court, Member of the European Parliament, and member of the Human Rights Committee and High Official of the European Community.

He participated in the negotiations that led to Portugal's recognition of the independence of Guinea-Bissau and São Tomé and Príncipe.

Jorge Campinos died prematurely in a tragic car accident in Mozambique in the year 1993.

== Honors ==
On June 9, 1994, Jorge Campinos was posthumously awarded the Grand Cross of the Order of Liberty by President Mário Soares.

In recognition of his figure as a politician and law professor, on June 17, 2004, he was honored by the Lisbon City Council, naming a street in the parish of Carnide after him.

== Published Works ==
Jorge Campinos authored several works:

- A ditadura militar 1926-1933 (1975)
- Carta constitucional de 1826 (1975)
- O Ministério dos Negócios Estrangeiros: estudo de Direito Internacional Público e de Direito Constitucional Comparado (1977)
- O presidencialismo do Estado Novo (1978)
- «Igualdade jurídica» e «desigualdade económica» em direito internacional público contemporâneo (1984)
- Organizações económicas universais (1985)
