= Mário Sottomayor Cardia =

Portuguese politician (1941–2006)

Minister of Education
- In office 23 July 1976 – 29 August 1978
- Preceded by: Vítor Alves
- Succeeded by: Carlos Lloyd Braga

Minister of Culture
- In office 23 January 1978 – 29 August 1978
- Preceded by: David Mourão-Ferreira (as Secretary of State)
- Succeeded by: Carlos Lloyd Braga

Member of the Assembly of the Republic
- In office 31 May 1983 – 3 November 1991
- Constituency: Lisbon
- In office 3 June 1976 – 12 November 1980
- Constituency: Lisbon

Member of the Constituent Assembly
- In office 2 June 1975 – 2 April 1976
- Constituency: Lisbon

Personal details
- Born: Mário Augusto Sottomayor Leal Cardia; 19 May 1941 Matosinhos, Portugal
- Died: 17 November 2006 (aged 65) Lisbon, Portugal
- Party: Socialist Party (1973–1997); Portuguese Communist Party (1963–1971)
- Occupation: Politician
- Profession: professor, journalist

Mário Augusto Sottomayor Leal Cardia (19 May 1941 – 17 November 2006) was a Portuguese journalist, professor and politician who served as Minister of Education and Culture from 1976 until 1978.

== Biography ==
Sottomayor Cardia was born in 1941 in Matosinhos. He was expelled from high school after supporting the secession of the Portuguese India. He studied Law in the University of Lisbon, later changing his studies to Philosophy.

He was supported Humberto Delgado's candidacy in the 1958 presidential election and, in 1963, joined the Portuguese Communist Party. He was a candidate in the 1965 and 1969 legislative elections within the CDE lists, being arrested by the PIDE in 1970. During his time in prison, he was tortured and brutally beaten, having suffered a lesion in his retina and become temporarily blind.

In 1971, Cardia left the PCP and was one of the founding members of the Socialist Party in 1973.

After the Carnation Revolution, he was elected to the Constituent Assembly and, in 1976, he joined Mário Soares' governments, firstly as Minister of Education and Scientific Investigation from 1976 until 1978, and then as Minister of Education and Culture in 1978.

Following the 1983 legislative election, he returned to the Assembly of the Republic. He started drifting apart from the Socialist Party during Vítor Constâncio's leadership, becoming more and more distant from Jorge Sampaio and António Guterres.

In March 1994, Sottomayor Cardia announced his candidacy for President in the 1996 presidential election, stating that he was the best candidate from the PS to beat Aníbal Cavaco Silva. He presented his candidacy in the São Bento Palace, with the presence of former Lisbon Mayor Aquilino Ribeiro Machado, but he ended up withrawing due to the lack of support of the party, which ended up supporting Jorge Sampaio.

Sottomayor Cardia died in 2006 in Lisbon, at 65 years old.
