= Margarida Marante =

Portuguese journalist (1959–2012)

Maria Margarida Marante Rodrigues Anjos, known as Margarida Marante (29 June 1959 – 5 October 2012) was a Portuguese journalist and television presenter known for interviewing major public Portuguese figures. She was married to the businessman Henrique Granadeiro, having previously divorced Emídio Rangel.

== Career ==
Marante began her career in 1976 at the weekly Tempo, before moving to RTP2 in 1978 and RTP1 in 1979. In 1989 she edited Elle Portugal, and in 1991 she joined Expresso. From 1992 to 2003 she was a presenter at Sociedade Independente de Comunicação (SIC).
