= 2nd Constitutional Government of Portugal =

Cabinet of Portugal in 1978, led by Mário Soares

II Constitutional Government of Portugal
- Cabinet of Portugal

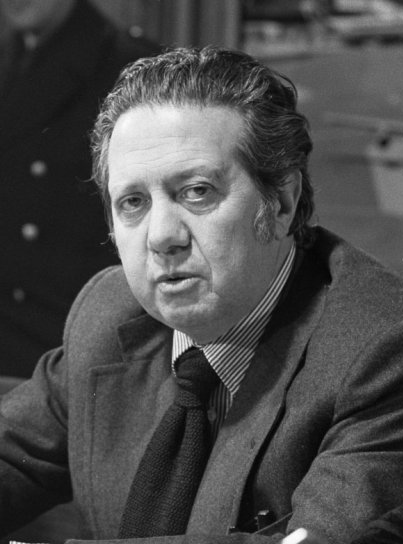
- Prime Minister Mário Soares
- Date formed: 23 January 1978
- Date dissolved: 29 August 1978

People and organisations
- President of the Republic: António Ramalho Eanes
- Prime Minister: Mário Soares
- Member parties: Socialist Party (PS); Democratic and Social Center (CDS)
- Status in legislature: Majority coalition government
- Opposition parties: Democratic People's Party (PPD); Portuguese Communist Party (PCP); Popular Democratic Union (UDP)

History
- Predecessor: I Constitutional Government of Portugal
- Successor: III Constitutional Government of Portugal

The II Constitutional Government of Portugal (Portuguese: II Governo Constitucional de Portugal) was the second government of the Third Portuguese Republic. It had Mário Soares as the Prime Minister and lasted from 23 January 1978 to 29 August 1978.

== Party breakdown ==
Party breakdown of cabinet ministers by the end of the government's time in office: (Prime Minister not included)

- Socialist Party
10
- Democratic Social Center
3
- Independents
4

== Composition ==
The government was composed of the Prime Minister, one Assistant Minister to the Prime Minister, and 14 ministries comprising ministers, secretaries and sub-secretaries of state. The government also included the Ministers of the Republic for the Autonomous Regions of Azores and Madeira.

Ministers of the II Constitutional Government of Portugal
Office	Minister	Party	Start of term	End of term
Prime Minister	Mário Soares	PS	23 January 1978	29 August 1978
Assistant Minister to the Prime Minister	António de Almeida Santos	PS	23 January 1978	29 August 1978
Minister of National Defence	Mário Firmino Miguel	Independent	23 January 1978	29 August 1978
Minister of Finance and Planning	Vitor Constâncio	PS	23 January 1978	29 August 1978
Minister of Justice	José Santos Pais	Independent	23 January 1978	29 August 1978
Minister of the Internal Administration	Alberto Oliveira e Silva	PS	23 January 1978	27 February 1978
Minister of the Internal Administration	Jaime Gama	PS	27 February 1978	29 August 1978
Minister of Foreign Affairs	Victor Sá Machado	CDS	23 January 1978	29 August 1978
Minister of Administrative Reform	Rui Pena	CDS	23 January 1978	29 August 1978
Minister of Agriculture and Fisheries	Luís Saias	PS	23 January 1978	29 August 1978
Minister of Industry and Technology	Carlos Melancia	PS	23 January 1978	29 August 1978
Minister of Commerce and Tourism	Basílio Horta	CDS	23 January 1978	29 August 1978
Minister of Labour	António Maldonado Gonelha	PS	23 January 1978	29 August 1978
Minister of Education and Culture	Mário Sottomayor Cardia	PS	23 January 1978	29 August 1978
Minister of Social Affairs	António Arnaut	PS	23 January 1978	29 August 1978
Minister of Transports and Communications	Manuel Ferreira Lima	PS	23 January 1978	29 August 1978
Minister of Housing and Public Works	António Sousa Gomes	PS	23 January 1978	29 August 1978
Minister of the Republic for the Autonomous Region of Azores	Octávio Galvão de Figueiredo	Independent	23 January 1978	29 August 1978
Minister of the Republic for the Autonomous Region of Madeira	Lino Miguel	Independent	23 January 1978	29 August 1978
