= Carlos Mota Pinto =

Portuguese professor and politician (1936–1985)

Prime Minister of Portugal
- In office 22 November 1978 – 1 August 1979
- President: António Ramalho Eanes
- Deputy: Manuel Jacinto Nunes
- Preceded by: Alfredo Nobre da Costa
- Succeeded by: Maria de Lurdes Pintasilgo

President of the Social Democratic Party
- In office 25 March 1984 – 10 February 1985
- Secretary-General: Francisco Antunes da Silva
- Preceded by: Nuno Rodrigues dos Santos
- Succeeded by: Rui Machete

Deputy Prime Minister of Portugal
- In office 9 June 1983 – 15 February 1985
- Prime Minister: Mário Soares
- Preceded by: Diogo Freitas do Amaral
- Succeeded by: Rui Machete

Minister of National Defence
- In office 9 June 1983 – 15 February 1985
- Prime Minister: Mário Soares
- Preceded by: Diogo Freitas do Amaral
- Succeeded by: Rui Machete

Minister of Commerce
- In office 25 March 1977 – 30 January 1978
- Prime Minister: Mário Soares
- Preceded by: António Barreto
- Succeeded by: Basílio Horta

Personal details
- Born: 25 July 1936 Pombal, Portugal
- Died: 7 May 1985 (aged 48) Coimbra, Portugal
- Party: Social Democratic (1974–1975; 1979–1985)
- Other political affiliations: Independent (1975–1979)
- Spouse: Maria Fernanda Correia
- Education: University of Coimbra
- Occupation: Jurist, professor

Carlos Alberto da Mota Pinto GCC GCIP (Portuguese pronunciation: [ˈkaɾluz alˈβɛɾtu ðɐ ˈmɔtɐ ˈpĩtu]; 25 July 1936 – 7 May 1985) was a Portuguese professor and politician who served as the prime minister of Portugal between November 1978 and August 1979.

Mota Pinto was one of the first members of the Social Democratic Party (PSD) in 1974. As an independent, he was minister of Commerce and Tourism in the first Constitutional Government of Portugal, between 1977 and 1978. In November 1978, also as an independent, he was appointed by President António Ramalho Eanes to be the prime minister in the IV Constitutional Government. In the following year, he resigned from the position and was succeeded by Maria de Lourdes Pintasilgo in August.

As a member of the PSD, he ran for prime minister in the 1983 legislative election, finishing second to Mário Soares, from the Socialist Party (PS). The two parties agreed on a coalition that became known as the Central Bloc, and Mota Pinto served as deputy prime minister and minister of National Defence in the IX Constitutional Government, between 1983 and 1985. A few months after leaving office, he died suddenly of an aneurysm at the age of 48.

== Career ==
He graduated as a licentiate in law and doctorate in judicial sciences from the Faculty of Law of the University of Coimbra. He was also a professor at the Portuguese Catholic University and several foreign universities. Still today, his doctrine is very influential in the Portuguese legal community, mainly in what comes to civil law.

After the Carnation Revolution, on 25 April 1974, he helped in the foundation, jointly with Francisco Sá Carneiro, Francisco Pinto Balsemão, Joaquim Magalhães Mota, João Bosco Mota Amaral, Alberto João Jardim, António Barbosa de Melo and António Marques Mendes, of the Popular Democratic Party (PPD, today PSD). He was elected Deputy to the Constituent Assembly and to the Assembly of the Republic (the name of the Assembly has its origins in a Mota Pinto's proposal) for PPD. Having distanced himself from Sá Carneiro, they would reconcile (at the time of Sá Carneiro's death they both supported the same presidential candidate, Soares Carneiro). He would again return to the party to serve as vice-president in 1983 and President in 1984 and 1985.

He was also Minister for Commerce and Tourism in the first Constitutional Government of Portugal (1976–1977), Prime Minister of the 4th Constitutional Government between 1978 and 1979 when he was appointed by then President António Ramalho Eanes, Vice-Prime Minister and Minister for Defense of the 9th Constitutional Government (the Central-Bloc Government) from 1983 to 1985.

He died suddenly in 1985, in Coimbra, days before the Congress that gave the Presidency of the party to Aníbal Cavaco Silva.

== Decorations ==
He was awarded with the Grand Crosses of the Order of Christ and the Order of Public Instruction.

== Family ==
He married Maria Fernanda Cardoso Correia and had three sons:

- Paulo Cardoso Correia da Mota Pinto (born Coimbra, 18 November 1966), a licentiate, doctorate, professor and renowned publicist of the Faculty of Law of the University of Coimbra;
- Nuno Cardoso Correia da Mota Pinto (born Coimbra, 18 September 1970), is the alternate executive director at the World Bank in Washington, D.C., married to Ianara Pedrosa;
- Alexandre Cardoso Correia da Mota Pinto (born 1971), a Doctor in Law from the Faculty of Law of the European University Institute of Florence and a Lawyer at Uría Menendez-Proença de Carvalho, married to Joana Ferraz.

== Electoral history ==
=== PSD Prime Ministerial candidate selection, 1983 ===
Ballot: 27 February 1983
Candidate	Votes	%
Carlos Mota Pinto		100.0
Turnout		
Source: PSD

=== Legislative election, 1983 ===
Ballot: 25 April 1983
Party	Candidate	Votes	%	Seats	+/−
PS	Mário Soares	2,061,309	36.1	101	+35
PSD	Carlos Mota Pinto	1,554,804	27.2	75	–7
APU	Álvaro Cunhal	1,031,609	18.1	44	+3
CDS	Lucas Pires	716,705	12.6	30	–16
Other parties		196,498	3.4	0	±0
Blank/Invalid ballots		146,770	2.6	–	–
Turnout		5,707,695	77.79	263	±0
Source: Comissão Nacional de Eleições

Political offices
Preceded by Alfredo Nobre da Costa	Prime Minister of Portugal; 1978–1979	Succeeded by Maria de Lourdes Pintasilgo
