= Salgado Zenha =

Portuguese politician (1923–1993)

Francisco Salgado Zenha GCL
- Zenha in 1976

Minister of Justice
- In office 16 May 1974 – 8 August 1975

Minister of Finance
- In office 19 September 1975 – 23 July 1976

Personal details
- Born: 2 May 1923 Braga
- Died: 1 November 1993 (aged 70) Lisbon

Francisco Salgado Zenha GCL (2 May 1923, Braga – 1 November 1993, Lisbon) was a Portuguese left-wing politician and lawyer.

== Career ==
As a student at the University of Coimbra, he was elected president of the Academic Association of Coimbra. He would be dismissed because he refused to support the Estado Novo regime. In 1945, he became one of the founders of the youth wing of the Movement of Democratic Unity (Portuguese: Movimento de Unidade Democrática – Juvenil or "MUD-J"), a movement that spanned all anti-Fascist opposition groups. His "subversive" actions got him imprisoned several times.

Later, he supported the presidential candidacy of Norton de Matos, following which he met Mário Soares. In the next election he supported Humberto Delgado. After that he joined several Socialist movements, and in 1973 he co-founded the Socialist Party. As a staunch anti-fascist, he gained popularity for defending people accused of supporting anti-fascism and anti-colonialism.

After the Carnation Revolution, he was the Minister of Justice in the first four democratic governments and Minister of Finance in the fifth.

He was a member of the commission which legalized divorce in Portugal in consultation with the Holy See. Between 1974 and 1982, he was a registered member of the Portuguese Socialist Party. From 1977 to 1983 he was a member of the European Parliament, representing Porto.

In 1980, he had a falling out with his old friend Mário Soares, stemming from the party supporting Ramalho Eanes in the presidential election.

In 1986, he stood as a presidential candidate with support from the Portuguese Communist Party and the Democratic Renovator Party. However, he failed to reach the second round and thereafter virtually disappeared from the political scene.

He died of cancer on 1 November 1993.

== Electoral history ==
=== Presidential election, 1986 ===
Ballot: 26 January and 16 February 1986
Candidate	First round		Second round	
Candidate	Votes	%	Votes	%
Mário Soares	1,443,683	25.4	3,010,756	51.2
Diogo Freitas do Amaral	2,629,597	46.3	2,872,064	48.8
Francisco Salgado Zenha	1,185,867	20.9		
Maria de Lourdes Pintasilgo	418,961	7.4		
Blank/Invalid ballots	64,626	–	54,280	–
Turnout	5,742,734	75.39	5,937,100	77.99
Source: Comissão Nacional de Eleições
