= Alfredo Nobre da Costa =

Portuguese engineer and politician (1923–1996)

Alfredo Nobre da Costa GCC

Prime Minister of Portugal
- In office 29 August 1978 – 22 November 1978
- President: António Ramalho Eanes
- Preceded by: Mário Soares
- Succeeded by: Carlos Mota Pinto

Minister of Industry and Technology
- In office 25 March 1977 – 30 January 1978
- Prime Minister: Mário Soares
- Preceded by: António Sousa Gomes
- Succeeded by: Carlos Melancia

Secretary of State for Heavy Industry
- In office 14 January 1976 – 23 July 1976
- Prime Minister: José Pinheiro de Azevedo
- Preceded by: Mário Cardoso dos Santos
- Succeeded by: Carlos Melancia

Personal details
- Born: 10 September 1923 Lapa, Lisbon, Portugal
- Died: 1 April 1996 (aged 72) Lisbon, Portugal
- Party: Independent
- Spouse: Maria de Lourdes de Carvalho e Cunha Fortes da Gama (m. 1951)
- Children: 1

Alfredo Jorge Nobre da Costa (Portuguese pronunciation: [ˈnɔβɾɨ ðɐ ˈkɔʃtɐ]; 10 September 1923 – 1 April 1996) was a Portuguese engineer and politician who briefly served as prime minister of Portugal from August to November 1978.

A moderate independent centre-left politician, he was appointed by President António Ramalho Eanes to serve as prime minister, which would finish the four-year legislative term which had been initiated in the 1976 Portuguese legislative election. His cabinet consisted of independents. However, it failed to gain a majority in the Assembly of the Republic, and Nobre da Costa resigned a few weeks after being sworn in. He was replaced by Carlos Mota Pinto. He was just the second head of government of Indian origin outside India, due to his patrilineal family being of Roman Catholic Brahmin lineage from Goa.

== Early life ==
He was the only son of Alfredo Henrique Andresen da Costa (born 4 November 1893), who was Portuguese of Italian, French, Danish and Goan ancestry, and Maria Helena Nobre. He graduated from Instituto Superior Técnico.

== Personal life ==
He married Maria de Lourdes de Carvalho e Cunha Fortes da Gama on 5 May 1951 and had a single daughter, Vera Maria Nobre da Costa (born 5 February 1952). He died in 1996 after a long illness. At the time of his death, he held the position of chairman at the engineering firm EFACEC.

== Honours ==
- Commander of the Order of Christ, Portugal (15 September 1961)
- Grand-Cross of the Order of Christ, Portugal (9 April 1981)
- Grand-Cross of the Order of Merit of the Italian Republic, Italy (11 April 1985)

Political offices
Preceded by Mário Soares	Prime Minister of Portugal; 1978	Succeeded by Carlos Mota Pinto
