= Maria de Lourdes Pintasilgo =

Portuguese politician (1930–2004)

Maria de Lourdes Pintasilgo GCC GCIH GCL
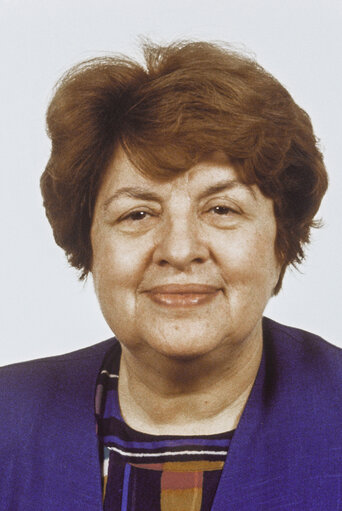
- Official portrait as an MEP, 1987

Prime Minister of Portugal
- In office 1 August 1979 – 3 January 1980
- President: António Ramalho Eanes
- Preceded by: Carlos Mota Pinto
- Succeeded by: Francisco Sá Carneiro

Minister of Social Affairs
- In office 17 July 1974 – 26 March 1975
- Prime Minister: Vasco Gonçalves
- Preceded by: Mário Murteira
- Succeeded by: Jorge Sá Borges

Secretary of State for Social Security
- In office 15 May 1974 – 17 July 1974
- Prime Minister: Adelino da Palma Carlos
- Preceded by: Joaquim Dias da Silva Pinto
- Succeeded by: Henrique Santa Clara Gomes

Member of the European Parliament
- In office 14 September 1987 – 24 July 1989
- Constituency: Portugal

Member of the Corporative Chamber
- In office 25 November 1969 – 25 April 1974
- Section: Administrative interests

Personal details
- Born: 18 January 1930 Abrantes, Portugal
- Died: 10 July 2004 (aged 74) Lisbon, Portugal
- Party: Socialist Party
- Other political affiliations: Democratic Renewal Party
- Education: Instituto Superior Técnico, University of Lisbon

Maria de Lourdes Ruivo da Silva de Matos Pintasilgo (Note: Portuguese pronunciation: [mɐˈɾiɐ ðɨ ˈluɾðɨʃ pĩtɐˈsilɣu]) GCC GCIH GCL (18 January 1930 – 10 July 2004) was a Portuguese chemical engineer and politician. She was the first and to date only woman to serve as Prime Minister of Portugal, and the second woman to serve as prime minister in Western Europe, after Margaret Thatcher.

== Early life ==
Maria de Lourdes Pintasilgo was born to a middle-class family in 1930. Her father, Jaime de Matos Pintasilgo (born Covilhã, Conceição, 9 December 1896 – died Lisbon, Socorro, 10 October 1959) was in the wool business, and her mother was Amélia do Carmo Ruivo da Silva, a native of Vendas Novas. Her parents married in Abrantes on 14 March 1929.

Her father, Jaime, abandoned the family and at school she tried hard to hide that, thus causing her to avoid usual relationships. At the age of seven, she was sent to the Liceu Filipa de Lencastre, a secondary school, in Lisbon. She distinguished herself in the Mocidade Portuguesa, a militaristic youth movement founded by Dictator Salazar. Later she joined Acção Católica (Catholic Action). During her years at the Instituto Superior Técnico from where she earned a degree in industrial chemical engineering, she joined and eventually led the Catholic's women's student movement.

== Early career ==
After graduating from University of Lisbon's Instituto Superior Técnico in 1953, at the age of 23, with an engineering degree in industrial chemistry she went into a graduate scholarship program with the national Nuclear Energy Board. After completing the program, she began working for a large Portuguese conglomerate with interests in cement plants, Companhia União Fabril, the "CUF". By 1954, she held the position of chief engineer of the studies and projects division. From that position she quickly moved to the position of project director, where she was in charge of the firm's documentation center and responsible for the company's technical journals. She held this position for seven years, until she left the company in 1960.

Pintasilgo had strong ties to the Roman Catholic Church. From 1952 to 1956, at Lisbon's Catholic University of Portugal, she was president of the women's group. In 1956 she became the international president of a movement of Catholic students, Pax Romana. In 1961, Pintasilgo joined the Grail (Graal), an international Catholic laywomen's movement. Two years after joining the Grail she led an international group working to improve the movement as well as establishing it in Portugal.

By 1965 she had become the Grail's international vice-president. She was also appointed by the Vatican and served as woman's liaison between the Roman Catholic Church and the World Council of Churches. After leaving Companhia União Fabril, she held a job in government until 1969 which was to run Portugal's program for development and social change. In 1970, she presided over government working groups involving women's affairs, as well as being a member of the Portuguese delegation to the United Nations, 1971–72. In 1974 she was appointed secretary of state for social welfare in the first provisional government following the revolution. She moved her way up to Minister of Social Affairs by early 1975. In 1975, Pintasilgo became Portugal's first ambassador to the United Nations Educational, Scientific and Cultural Organization, UNESCO.

== Tenure as prime minister and later career ==
In 1979 she was called on by General António Ramalho Eanes, the president of Portugal, to become prime minister. Pintasilgo was sworn in as the prime minister of the Portuguese caretaker government on 1 August 1979 with the term of three months in office. During her time in office she pushed to modernize the out-dated social welfare system. She left her mark by making social security universal and improving health care, education, and labor legislation in Portugal.

She contributed the piece "Daring to be different" to the 1984 anthology Sisterhood Is Global: The International Women's Movement Anthology, edited by Robin Morgan.

Pintasilgo was the first woman to run for president in 1986. She ran as an independent and received 7% of the votes. The following year she was elected to the European Parliament as a member of the Socialist Party which she held until 1989.

From 1992 and for almost a decade, she chaired the Independent Commission for Population and Quality of Life - ICPQL. Hosted by the United Nations Educational, Scientific and Cultural Organization, UNESCO, in Paris, the international commission was established by a coalition of governments and global foundations in order to make recommendations to be presented to the UN system and donors community. In her statement at the Cairo UN International Conference on Population and Development on Sept, 7, 1994, Maria de Lourdes Pintasilgo explained, "The ultimate goal of Population and Development is to accord an improved quality of life to the people of the world. Not only to count people but to ensure that people count in Development". The commission's report was published in 1996 under the title: "Caring for the Future, Making the Next Decades Provide a Life Worth Living", edited by Oxford University Press.

Maria de Lourdes Pintasilgo died of cardiac arrest at her home in Lisbon on 10 July 2004, aged 74. She was buried in Prazeres Cemetery, in Lisbon.

== Electoral history ==
=== Presidential election, 1986 ===
Ballot: 26 January and 16 February 1986
Candidate	First round		Second round	
Candidate	Votes	%	Votes	%
Mário Soares	1,443,683	25.4	3,010,756	51.2
Diogo Freitas do Amaral	2,629,597	46.3	2,872,064	48.8
Francisco Salgado Zenha	1,185,867	20.9		
Maria de Lourdes Pintasilgo	418,961	7.4		
Blank/Invalid ballots	64,626	–	54,280	–
Turnout	5,742,734	75.39	5,937,100	77.99
Source: Comissão Nacional de Eleições

=== European Parliament election, 1987 ===
Ballot: 19 July 1987
Party	Candidate	Votes	%	Seats
PSD	Pedro Santana Lopes	2,111,828	37.5	10
PS	Maria de Lourdes Pintasilgo	1,267,672	22.5	6
CDS	Lucas Pires	868,718	15.4	4
CDU	Ângelo Veloso	648,700	11.5	3
PRD	Medeiros Ferreira	250,158	4.4	1
PPM	Miguel Esteves Cardoso	155,990	2.8	0
Other parties		193,869	3.4	0
Blank/Invalid ballots		142,715	2.5	–
Turnout		5,639,650	72.42	24
Source: Comissão Nacional de Eleições

== Legacy ==
Maria de Lourdes Pintasilgo was a student at Instituto Superior Técnico (IST), a university in Portugal. Since 2016, IST promotes the Maria de Lourdes Pintasilgo Award aiming to recognize and reward annually two women that graduated at IST, as a way to promote the gender balance policy at IST as well as recognize the crucial role that women have in all fields of Engineering.

== Notes ==
Political offices
Preceded by Carlos Mota Pinto	Prime Minister of Portugal; 1979–1980	Succeeded by Francisco Sá Carneiro
