= List of regions and sub-regions of Portugal =

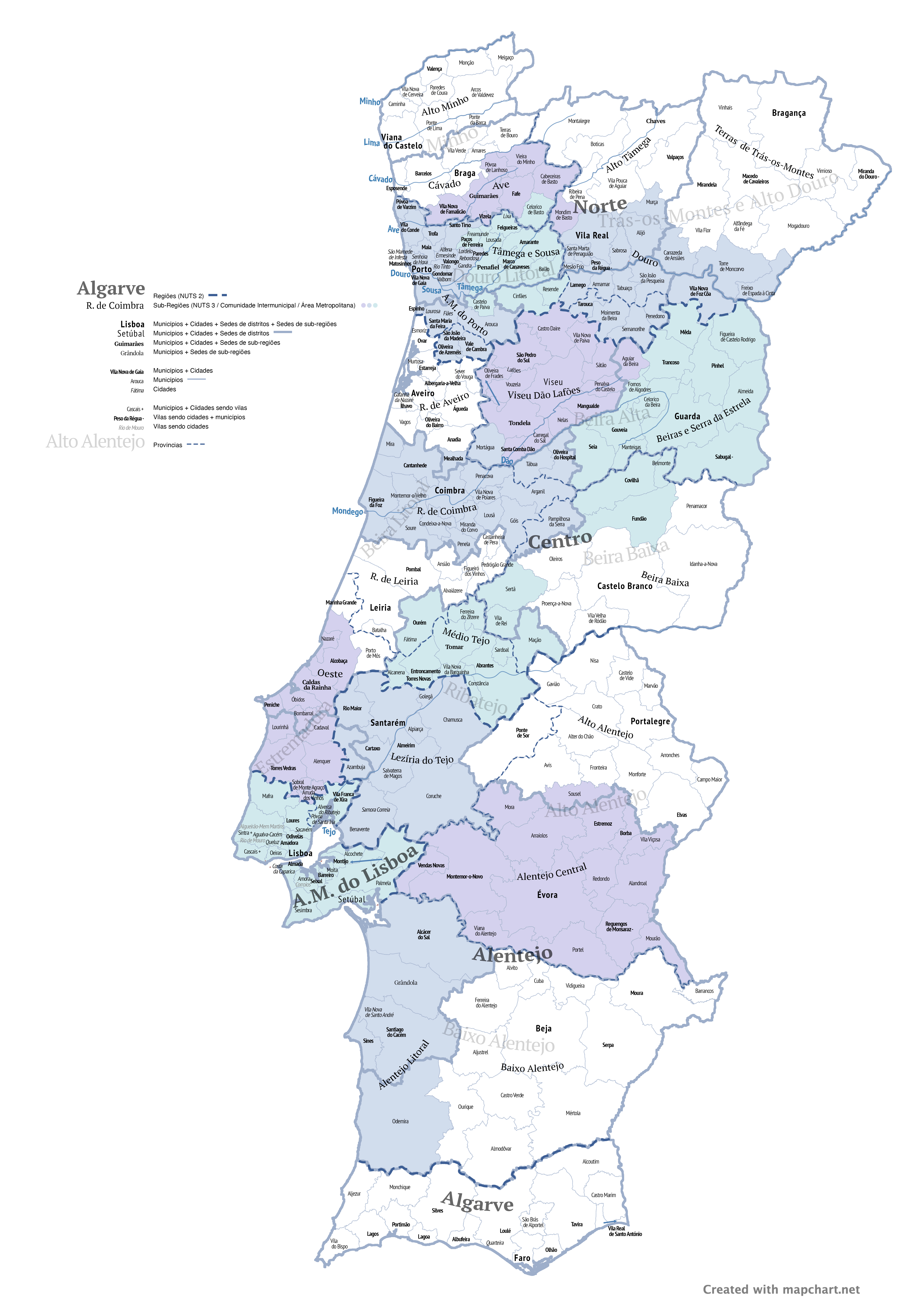
Administrative divisions of continental Portugal, including districts, NUTS and historical provinces.

This is the list of the municipalities of Portugal under the NUTS 2 and NUTS 3 format. The NUTS 3 regions were revised in 2015; since then, the subregions (NUTS 3) coincide with the intermunicipal communities. The current and the former compositions of the NUTS regions are given below, in the following format:

- NUTS 2 region [number of subregions]
  - NUTS 3 region [number of municipalities]
    - District (partially or fully belonging to that subregion) [number of municipalities]
      - Municipality

== After 2023 ==
=== Continental Portugal [7 regions] ===
- Norte Region (Northern Portugal) [8 subregions]
  - Porto metropolitan area [17]
    - Aveiro District [6]
      - Arouca
      - Espinho
      - Oliveira de Azeméis
      - Santa Maria da Feira
      - São João da Madeira
      - Vale de Cambra
    - Porto District [11]
      - Gondomar
      - Maia
      - Matosinhos
      - Paredes
      - Porto
      - Póvoa de Varzim
      - Santo Tirso
      - Trofa
      - Valongo
      - Vila do Conde
      - Vila Nova de Gaia
  - Alto Minho [10]
    - Viana do Castelo District [10]
      - Arcos de Valdevez
      - Caminha
      - Melgaço
      - Monção
      - Paredes de Coura
      - Ponte da Barca
      - Ponte de Lima
      - Valença
      - Viana do Castelo
      - Vila Nova de Cerveira
  - Alto Tâmega [6 municipalities]
    - Vila Real District [6]
      - Boticas
      - Chaves
      - Montalegre
      - Ribeira de Pena
      - Valpaços
      - Vila Pouca de Aguiar
  - Ave [8]
    - Braga District [7]
      - Cabeceiras de Basto
      - Fafe
      - Guimarães
      - Póvoa de Lanhoso
      - Vieira do Minho
      - Vila Nova de Famalicão
      - Vizela
    - Vila Real District [1]
      - Mondim de Basto
  - Cávado [6]
    - Braga District [6]
      - Amares
      - Barcelos
      - Braga
      - Esposende
      - Terras de Bouro
      - Vila Verde
  - Douro [19]
    - Bragança District [3]
      - Carrazeda de Ansiães
      - Freixo de Espada à Cinta
      - Torre de Moncorvo
    - Guarda District [1]
      - Vila Nova de Foz Côa
    - Vila Real District [7]
      - Alijó
      - Mesão Frio
      - Murça
      - Peso da Régua
      - Sabrosa
      - Santa Marta de Penaguião
      - Vila Real
    - Viseu District [8]
      - Armamar
      - Lamego
      - Moimenta da Beira
      - Penedono
      - São João da Pesqueira
      - Sernancelhe
      - Tabuaço
      - Tarouca
  - Tâmega e Sousa [11]
    - Aveiro District [1]
      - Castelo de Paiva
    - Braga District [1]
      - Celorico de Basto
    - Porto District [7]
      - Amarante
      - Baião
      - Felgueiras
      - Lousada
      - Marco de Canaveses
      - Paços de Ferreira
      - Penafiel
    - Viseu District [2]
      - Cinfães
      - Resende
  - Terras de Trás-os-Montes [9 municipalities]
    - Bragança District [8]
      - Alfândega da Fé
      - Bragança
      - Macedo de Cavaleiros
      - Miranda do Douro
      - Mirandela
      - Mogadouro
      - Vila Flor
      - Vimioso
      - Vinhais
- Centro Region (Central Portugal) [6] subregions]
  - Beira Baixa [8]
    - Castelo Branco District [8]
      - Castelo Branco
      - Idanha-a-Nova
      - Oleiros
      - Penamacor
      - Proença-a-Nova
      - Vila Velha de Ródão
      - Sertã
      - Vila de Rei
  - Beiras e Serra da Estrela [15]
    - Castelo Branco District [3]
      - Belmonte
      - Covilhã
      - Fundão
    - Guarda District [12]
      - Almeida
      - Celorico da Beira
      - Figueira de Castelo Rodrigo
      - Fornos de Algodres
      - Gouveia
      - Guarda
      - Manteigas
      - Mêda
      - Pinhel
      - Sabugal
      - Seia
      - Trancoso
  - Região de Aveiro [11]
    - Aveiro District [11]
      - Águeda
      - Albergaria-a-Velha
      - Anadia
      - Aveiro
      - Estarreja
      - Ílhavo
      - Murtosa
      - Oliveira do Bairro
      - Ovar
      - Sever do Vouga
      - Vagos
  - Região de Coimbra [8 municipalities]
    - Aveiro District [1]
      - Mealhada
    - Coimbra District [17]
      - Arganil
      - Cantanhede
      - Coimbra
      - Condeixa-a-Nova
      - Figueira da Foz
      - Góis
      - Lousã
      - Mira
      - Miranda do Corvo
      - Montemor-o-Velho
      - Oliveira do Hospital
      - Pampilhosa da Serra
      - Penacova
      - Penela
      - Soure
      - Tábua
      - Vila Nova de Poiares
    - Viseu District [1]
      - Mortágua
  - Região de Leiria [10]
    - Leiria District [10]
      - Alvaiázere
      - Ansião
      - Batalha
      - Castanheira de Pêra
      - Figueiró dos Vinhos
      - Leiria
      - Marinha Grande
      - Pedrógão Grande
      - Pombal
      - Porto de Mós
  - Viseu Dão Lafões [14]
    - Guarda District [1]
      - Aguiar da Beira
    - Viseu District [13]
      - Carregal do Sal
      - Castro Daire
      - Mangualde
      - Nelas
      - Oliveira de Frades
      - Penalva do Castelo
      - Santa Comba Dão
      - São Pedro do Sul
      - Sátão
      - Tondela
      - Vila Nova de Paiva
      - Viseu
      - Vouzela
- Oeste e Vale do Tejo (West and Tagus Valley) [3 subregion]
  - Lezíria do Tejo [11]
    - Lisbon District [1]
      - Azambuja
    - Santarém District [10]
      - Almeirim
      - Alpiarça
      - Benavente
      - Cartaxo
      - Chamusca
      - Coruche
      - Golegã
      - Rio Maior
      - Salvaterra de Magos
      - Santarém
  - Médio Tejo [11]
    - Santarém District [11]
      - Abrantes
      - Alcanena
      - Constância
      - Entroncamento
      - Ferreira do Zêzere
      - Mação
      - Ourém
      - Sardoal
      - Tomar
      - Torres Novas
      - Vila Nova da Barquinha
  - Oeste [12]
    - Leiria District [6]
      - Alcobaça
      - Bombarral
      - Caldas da Rainha
      - Nazaré
      - Óbidos
      - Peniche
    - Lisbon District [6]
      - Alenquer
      - Arruda dos Vinhos
      - Cadaval
      - Lourinhã
      - Sobral de Monte Agraço
      - Torres Vedras
- Lisboa Region [1 subregion]
  - Lisbon metropolitan area [9 municipalities]
    - Lisbon District [9]
      - Amadora
      - Cascais
      - Lisbon
      - Loures
      - Mafra
      - Odivelas
      - Oeiras
      - Sintra
      - Vila Franca de Xira
- Península de Setúbal (Setúbal Peninsula) [1 subregion]
  - Península de Setúbal [9 municipalities]
    - Setúbal District [9]
      - Alcochete
      - Almada
      - Barreiro
      - Moita
      - Montijo
      - Palmela
      - Seixal
      - Sesimbra
      - Setúbal
- Alentejo Region [4 subregions]
  - Alentejo Central [14 municipalities]
    - Évora District [14]
      - Alandroal
      - Arraiolos
      - Borba
      - Estremoz
      - Évora
      - Montemor-o-Novo
      - Mora
      - Mourão
      - Portel
      - Redondo
      - Reguengos de Monsaraz
      - Vendas Novas
      - Viana do Alentejo
      - Vila Viçosa
  - Alentejo Litoral [5]
    - Beja District [1]
      - Odemira
    - Setúbal District [4]
      - Alcácer do Sal
      - Grândola
      - Santiago do Cacém
      - Sines
  - Alto Alentejo [15]
    - Portalegre District [15]
      - Alter do Chão
      - Arronches
      - Avis
      - Campo Maior
      - Castelo de Vide
      - Crato
      - Elvas
      - Fronteira
      - Gavião
      - Marvão
      - Monforte
      - Nisa
      - Ponte de Sôr
      - Portalegre
      - Sousel
  - Baixo Alentejo [13]
    - Beja District [13]
      - Aljustrel
      - Almodôvar
      - Alvito
      - Barrancos
      - Beja
      - Castro Verde
      - Cuba
      - Ferreira do Alentejo
      - Mértola
      - Moura
      - Ourique
      - Serpa
      - Vidigueira
- Algarve [1 subregion]
  - Algarve [16 municipalities]
    - Faro District [16]
      - Albufeira
      - Alcoutim
      - Aljezur
      - Castro Marim
      - Faro
      - Lagoa
      - Lagos
      - Loulé
      - Monchique
      - Olhão
      - Portimão
      - São Brás de Alportel
      - Silves
      - Tavira
      - Vila do Bispo
      - Vila Real de Santo António

=== Overseas Portugal [2 regions] ===
- Azores, Autonomous Region of [1 subregion]
  - Azores [19 municipalities]
    - Angra do Heroísmo District [5]
      - Angra do Heroísmo
      - Calheta
      - Praia da Vitória
      - Santa Cruz da Graciosa
      - Velas
    - Horta District [7]
      - Corvo
      - Horta
      - Lajes das Flores
      - Lajes do Pico
      - Madalena
      - Santa Cruz das Flores
      - São Roque do Pico
    - Ponta Delgada District [7]
      - Lagoa
      - Nordeste
      - Ponta Delgada
      - Povoação
      - Ribeira Grande
      - Vila do Porto
      - Vila Franca do Campo
- Madeira, Autonomous Region of [1 subregion]
  - Madeira [11 municipalities]
    - Funchal District [11]
      - Calheta
      - Câmara de Lobos
      - Funchal
      - Machico
      - Ponta do Sol
      - Porto Moniz
      - Porto Santo
      - Ribeira Brava
      - Santa Cruz
      - Santana
      - São Vicente

== Before 2015 ==
=== Continental Portugal [5 regions] ===
- Norte Region (Northern Portugal) [8 subregions]
  - Alto Trás-os-Montes Subregion [14 municipalities]
    - Bragança District [8]
      - Alfândega da Fé
      - Bragança
      - Macedo de Cavaleiros
      - Miranda do Douro
      - Mirandela
      - Mogadouro
      - Vimioso
      - Vinhais
    - Vila Real District [6]
      - Boticas
      - Chaves
      - Montalegre
      - Murça
      - Valpaços
      - Vila Pouca de Aguiar
  - Ave Subregion [8]
    - Braga District[6]
      - Fafe
      - Guimarães
      - Póvoa de Lanhoso
      - Vieira do Minho
      - Vila Nova de Famalicão
      - Vizela
    - Porto District [2]
      - Santo Tirso
      - Trofa
  - Cávado Subregion [6]
    - Braga District [6]
      - Amares
      - Barcelos
      - Braga
      - Esposende
      - Terras de Bouro
      - Vila Verde
  - Douro Subregion [19]
    - Bragança District [4]
      - Carrazeda de Ansiães
      - Freixo de Espada à Cinta
      - Torre de Moncorvo
      - Vila Flor
    - Guarda District [1]
      - Vila Nova de Foz Côa
    - Vila Real District [6]
      - Alijó
      - Mesão Frio
      - Peso da Régua
      - Sabrosa
      - Santa Marta de Penaguião
      - Vila Real
    - Viseu District [8]
      - Armamar
      - Lamego
      - Moimenta da Beira
      - Penedono
      - São João da Pesqueira
      - Sernancelhe
      - Tabuaço
      - Tarouca
  - Entre Douro e Vouga Subregion [5]
    - Aveiro District [5]
      - Arouca
      - Oliveira de Azeméis
      - Santa Maria da Feira
      - São João da Madeira
      - Vale de Cambra
  - Grande Porto Subregion [9]
    - Aveiro District [1]
      - Espinho
    - Porto District [8]
      - Gondomar
      - Maia
      - Matosinhos
      - Porto
      - Póvoa de Varzim
      - Valongo
      - Vila do Conde
      - Vila Nova de Gaia
  - Minho-Lima Subregion [10]
    - Viana do Castelo District [10]
      - Arcos de Valdevez
      - Caminha
      - Melgaço
      - Monção
      - Paredes de Coura
      - Ponte da Barca
      - Ponte de Lima
      - Valença
      - Viana do Castelo
      - Vila Nova de Cerveira
  - Tâmega Subregion [15]
    - Aveiro District [1]
      - Castelo de Paiva
    - Braga District [2]
      - Cabeceiras de Basto
      - Celorico de Basto
    - Porto District [8]
      - Amarante
      - Baião
      - Felgueiras
      - Lousada
      - Marco de Canaveses
      - Paços de Ferreira
      - Paredes
      - Penafiel
    - Vila Real District [2]
      - Mondim de Basto
      - Ribeira de Pena
    - Viseu District [2]
      - Cinfães
      - Resende
- Centro Region (Central Portugal) [12 subregions]
  - Baixo Mondego Subregion [8 municipalities]
    - Coimbra District [8]
      - Cantanhede
      - Coimbra
      - Condeixa-a-Nova
      - Figueira da Foz
      - Mira
      - Montemor-o-Velho
      - Penacova
      - Soure
  - Baixo Vouga Subregion [12]
    - Aveiro District [12]
      - Águeda
      - Albergaria-a-Velha
      - Anadia
      - Aveiro
      - Estarreja
      - Ílhavo
      - Mealhada
      - Murtosa
      - Oliveira do Bairro
      - Ovar
      - Sever do Vouga
      - Vagos
  - Beira Interior Norte Subregion [9]
    - Guarda District [9]
      - Almeida
      - Celorico da Beira
      - Figueira de Castelo Rodrigo
      - Guarda
      - Manteigas
      - Mêda
      - Pinhel
      - Sabugal
      - Trancoso
  - Beira Interior Sul Subregion [4]
    - Castelo Branco District [4]
      - Castelo Branco
      - Idanha-a-Nova
      - Penamacor
      - Vila Velha de Ródão
  - Cova da Beira Subregion [3]
    - Castelo Branco District [3]
      - Belmonte
      - Covilhã
      - Fundão
  - Dão-Lafões Subregion [15]
    - Guarda District [1]
      - Aguiar da Beira
    - Viseu District [14]
      - Carregal do Sal
      - Castro Daire
      - Mangualde
      - Mortágua
      - Nelas
      - Oliveira de Frades
      - Penalva do Castelo
      - Santa Comba Dão
      - São Pedro do Sul
      - Sátão
      - Tondela
      - Vila Nova de Paiva
      - Viseu
      - Vouzela
  - Médio Tejo Subregion [11]
    - Portalegre District [1]
      - Gavião
    - Santarém District [10]
      - Abrantes
      - Alcanena
      - Constância
      - Entroncamento
      - Ferreira do Zêzere
      - Ourém
      - Sardoal
      - Tomar
      - Torres Novas
      - Vila Nova da Barquinha
  - Oeste Subregion (Western Portugal Subregion) [13]
    - Leiria District [6]
      - Alcobaça
      - Bombarral
      - Caldas da Rainha
      - Nazaré
      - Óbidos
      - Peniche
    - Lisbon District [7]
      - Alenquer
      - Arruda dos Vinhos
      - Cadaval
      - Lourinhã
      - Mafra
      - Sobral de Monte Agraço
      - Torres Vedras
  - Pinhal Interior Norte Subregion [14]
    - Coimbra District [9]
      - Arganil
      - Góis
      - Lousã
      - Miranda do Corvo
      - Oliveira do Hospital
      - Pampilhosa da Serra
      - Penela
      - Tábua
      - Vila Nova de Poiares
    - Leiria District [5]
      - Alvaiázere
      - Ansião
      - Castanheira de Pêra
      - Figueiró dos Vinhos
      - Pedrógão Grande
  - Pinhal Interior Sul Subregion [5]
    - Castelo Branco District [4]
      - Oleiros
      - Proença-a-Nova
      - Sertã
      - Vila de Rei
    - Santarém District [1]
      - Mação
  - Pinhal Litoral Subregion [5]
    - Leiria District [5]
      - Batalha
      - Leiria
      - Marinha Grande
      - Pombal
      - Porto de Mós
  - Serra da Estrela Subregion [3]
    - Guarda District [3]
      - Fornos de Algodres
      - Gouveia
      - Seia
- Lisboa Region [2 subregions]
  - Grande Lisboa Subregion [8 municipalities]
    - Lisbon District [8]
      - Amadora
      - Cascais
      - Lisbon
      - Loures
      - Odivelas
      - Oeiras
      - Sintra
      - Vila Franca de Xira
  - Península de Setúbal Subregion [9]
    - Setúbal District [9]
      - Alcochete
      - Almada
      - Barreiro
      - Moita
      - Montijo
      - Palmela
      - Seixal
      - Sesimbra
      - Setúbal
- Alentejo Region [5 subregions]
  - Alentejo Central Subregion [14 municipalities]
    - Évora District [13]
      - Alandroal
      - Arraiolos
      - Borba
      - Estremoz
      - Évora
      - Montemor-o-Novo
      - Mourão
      - Portel
      - Redondo
      - Reguengos de Monsaraz
      - Vendas Novas
      - Viana do Alentejo
      - Vila Viçosa
    - Portalegre District [1]
      - Sousel
  - Alentejo Litoral Subregion [5]
    - Beja District [1]
      - Odemira
    - Setúbal District [4]
      - Alcácer do Sal
      - Grândola
      - Santiago do Cacém
      - Sines
  - Alto Alentejo Subregion [14]
    - Évora District [1]
      - Mora
    - Portalegre District [13]
      - Alter do Chão
      - Arronches
      - Avis
      - Campo Maior
      - Castelo de Vide
      - Crato
      - Elvas
      - Fronteira
      - Marvão
      - Monforte
      - Nisa
      - Ponte de Sôr
      - Portalegre
  - Baixo Alentejo Subregion [13]
    - Beja District [13]
      - Aljustrel
      - Almodôvar
      - Alvito
      - Barrancos
      - Beja
      - Castro Verde
      - Cuba
      - Ferreira do Alentejo
      - Mértola
      - Moura
      - Ourique
      - Serpa
      - Vidigueira
  - Lezíria do Tejo Subregion [11]
    - Lisbon District [1]
      - Azambuja
    - Santarém District [10]
      - Almeirim
      - Alpiarça
      - Benavente
      - Cartaxo
      - Chamusca
      - Coruche
      - Golegã
      - Rio Maior
      - Salvaterra de Magos
      - Santarém
- Algarve Region [1 subregion]
  - Algarve Subregion [16 municipalities]
    - Faro District [16]
      - Albufeira
      - Alcoutim
      - Aljezur
      - Castro Marim
      - Faro
      - Lagoa
      - Lagos
      - Loulé
      - Monchique
      - Olhão
      - Portimão
      - São Brás de Alportel
      - Silves
      - Tavira
      - Vila do Bispo
      - Vila Real de Santo António

=== Overseas Portugal [2 regions] ===
- Azores, Autonomous Region of [1 subregion]
  - Azores [19 municipalities]
    - Angra do Heroísmo District [5]
      - Angra do Heroísmo
      - Calheta
      - Praia da Vitória
      - Santa Cruz da Graciosa
      - Velas
    - Horta District [7]
      - Corvo
      - Horta
      - Lajes das Flores
      - Lajes do Pico
      - Madalena
      - Santa Cruz das Flores
      - São Roque do Pico
    - Ponta Delgada District [7]
      - Lagoa
      - Nordeste
      - Ponta Delgada
      - Povoação
      - Ribeira Grande
      - Vila do Porto
      - Vila Franca do Campo
- Madeira, Autonomous Region of [1 subregion]
  - Madeira [11 municipalities]
    - Funchal District [11]
      - Calheta
      - Câmara de Lobos
      - Funchal
      - Machico
      - Ponta do Sol
      - Porto Moniz
      - Porto Santo
      - Ribeira Brava
      - Santa Cruz
      - Santana
      - São Vicente
