= 6 June 1975 Micalense Farmers' Protest =

Micalense Farmers' Protest
- Part of Carnation Revolution
- Date: 6 June 1975
- Location: Ponta Delgada, São Miguel, Azores
- Caused by: Demonstration over agricultural issues, with mixed reactions against the left-leaning policies on the continent, and the desire to prevent progressive reforms in São Miguel.
- Goals: Desire to prevent progressive reforms that included rural land rent policies and the adoption of agrarian reforms
- Methods: Civil protest, leaflet campaign, civil disobedience
- Result: Mass arrests, court trials

Parties
Civil Governor, MFA	Rural property-owners, right-wing factions

Lead figures
António Borges Coutinho, Álvaro Soares de Melo	José Franco, Luís Indio, Armando Goyannes, Luís Franco

Casualties
- Arrested: 29
- Detained: 3

The 6 June 1975 Micalense Farmers' Protest, or simply the 6 June (as it is known locally), was an organized protest by Micalense farmers, in Ponta Delgada, the capital of the then-Autonomous District of the same name, following the Carnation Revolution. Inspired by rural property-owners and right-wing factions, the protest forced the resignation of the civil governor and inspired a series of terrorist acts, that ultimately led to the creation of the Regional Junta of the Azores, and the basis of modern Azorean politics.

== History ==
The protest was organized by large property-owners and landed gentry of the island of São Miguel that united hundreds of protesters. The principal motive of the gathering was to demonstrate agricultural issues, but mixed reactions against the left-leaning policies on the continent, and the desire to prevent progressive reforms in São Miguel. In particular, was a proposal by the anti-fascist Civil Governor of the Autonomous District of the Azores, António Borges Coutinho, and President of the Junta Geral, Álvaro Soares de Melo (both members of the MDP/CDE), to implement the reform of rural land rent policies and, possibly, the adoption of agrarian reforms imposed by the Ministry of Agriculture (Portuguese: Ministério da Agricultura).

The possibility of freedom and democracy, promoted by the Movement of the Captains (Portuguese: Movimento dos Capitães) brought to the Azores a perception that the time to reclaim political autonomy or even independence was at hand for some. The radical politics in the continent, with the spectre of nationalization, contributed daily to the feeling of confrontation, in an archipelago that was openly hostile to communism and leftist ideologies.

The economic situation in the region was no better. In 1975, half of the population was involved in agriculture, and the nascent economy was asfixated by the price differential between the islands and the continent. Feed, fertilizer, cement and gas/oil were all influenced by cost of transport, inflation and the high margins fixed by commercial monopolies. High interest rates and low milk prices put the agricultural industries at risk: many of the farming families were desperate.

=== Event ===
Although the protest was prohibited in a joint communique by the Civil and Military Governors, it nonetheless went ahead. The Military Governor, General Altino Pinto de Magalhães, had indicated that a protest at that time was not prudent, owing to arrival of a NATO squadron at the city port, which could have been interpreted as a reaction to their presence. Members of the agricultural cooperatives were mobilized, with tractors and pickup trucks arriving from around the island, parading around the streets of Ponta Delgada. There were chants of "If you are Azorean come here!", including cries of "exploitation" and unequal treatment by continental Portuguese. The protest wound through streets, following the path of the annual festival of Senhor Santo Cristo dos Milagres, although veering off to the headquarters of the PCP at one point, to provoke the communists.

The idea was made by the leaders of the protest, José Franco, Luís Indio, Armando Goyannes and Luís Franco, among others, linked to the independence movements like MAPA and, later, FLA.

When the procession finally reached the Palace of Conceição, the first placards started to appear, appealing to Azorean freedom, mixed with cries of "Viva a independência dos Açores" (Long live the independence of the Azores). In addition, the main captains of the political arm of the FLA appeared, the lawyers Carlos Melo Bento and Abel Carreiro. It was at that time that the protest took on a character of separatism: "We need to be free...we need to demonstrate that the Azores are able to auto-govern themselves....This protest is for independence and is just"!

By this time, the first military interventions in the protest, in order to block the crowd, but protesters were able to enter the Civil Governor's offices. Within the Palace, after a few moments of tension, the protesters demanded the head of Governor Borges Coutinho, the political symbol of the "communist threat" from the continent. This was the main reason for Luís Franco, and other leaders of the protest: to demand his resignation.

António Borges Coutinho appeared at the top of the staircase, and received a delegation from the protesters to discuss their demands. During the course of this discussion, Coutinho was interrupted by the Military Governor, who affirmed that the Civil Governor should resign, in order to put an end to the protests. Coutinho, losing his power base by the Military Governor, therefore resigned publicly on the veranda of the Palace of Conceição.

=== Aftermath ===
A series of protests occurred in simultaneity with the events (but were likely planned earlier), including the occupation of the headquarters of the regional radio station (ERA) and the main post office, as well as the blockade of the runways of Ponta Delgada's airport.

The Military Governor ordered the imprisonment of the principal individuals allegedly responsible for the acts, resulting in the detention of approximately 29 of the participants. The majority of the people rounded up by local security forces were linked to the political right, some separatists/independentists or fascists, who were imprisoned in Angra do Heroísmo, including:

- Abel da Câmara Carreiro (1916–2006), a sexagenarian lawyer, who was apprehended in the morning at his home, on Rua Dr. Armando Cortes Rodrigues (Ponta Delgada), who was a jurist and founder of the Movimento de Autodeterminação do Povo Açoriano (Movement for the Auto-determination of the Azorean People), who participated along with General Altino de Maglhães in the forced resignation of the Civil Governor, in the Palace of Conceição (and tried to prevent violent reprisals);
- Aguinaldo da Silva Almeida Carneiro (26 June 1951 – 15 March 1999), captured at 3:30 in the morning, by soldiers who were once instructees, at his home on Rua Teófilo Braga in Ponta Delgada, even as his wife was expecting their first child. Noting the stress that this would cause, he proposed to the soldiers that they should arrest him on Rua da Vila Nova de Baixo, while she was sent to her father's home. He was an active organizer and protester during 6 June, who entered the Palace and took to the veranda with the Civil Governor, when he resigned;
- Álvaro Pereira Branco Moreira was arrested at home on Rua dos Prestes de Baixo, one of the few prisoners who were unjustly detained, in place of his brother Rui, who was intimately involved in the protest and FLA;
- António Brum de Sousa Dourado, from a monarchist family and anti-communist, was arrested at his home on Rua Carvalho Araújo in Ponta Delgada, for his involvement as an active protest organizer, founder of the MAPA and its signatory to its manifesto (while his son, painted in black, had improvised a fire in front of the barracks, in a provocative preparatory action before 6 June);
- Antônio Clemente Pereira da Costa Santos, Counsel of France, was also arrested at his home on Rua Dr. Bruno Carreiro (Ponta Delgada), in the presence of his wife and children, by soldiers who had followed the couple into their home (and bathroom). A relatively wealthy man, having inherited a great fortune, his role was small, although he was loathed by some local militants, he was one of the first to be freed after eight days of jail. During his sentence, the French crew of naval ship docking in Ponta Delgada were surprised, since the Counsel, who should have been waiting, was not in attendance: representatives traveled to the square in Angra do Heroísmo where they waited until he was freed;
- António José do Amaral was arrested at 2:00 in the morning, at Rua do Diário dos Açores by a Sergeant and PSP officer; member of the MAPA, he was contacted before the protest by Rainer Daehnart, art dealer and active supporter of anti-communists forces. He was interrogated in the barracks in Ponta Delgada various times, for comments, threats and digressions made about Azorean independence during a Christmas dinner party, where he was denounced by a lieutenant in Fiscal Guard;
- António Manuel Gomes de Menezes, captured on Rua Dr. Armando Narciso, in the Bairro da Vitória, by a platoon of 12 nervous armed soldiers, captained by a marine sergeant, son-in-law of Floriberto Rodrigues. When captured, he and his wife had returned after a dinner with António Costa Santos, and their children were already asleep: when arrested he was counseled to bring a razor. António Menezes, participated in the protests, was a member of MAPA and FLA, and days earlier had accompanied Commander Eduardo Pavão, when he distributed independence pamphlets around Ponta Delgada, aboard a small airplane of the Aeroclube de S. Miguel;
- António Nuno Alves da Câmara, a young Azorean ex-military, was spirited from his house in Abelheira (Fajã de Baixo), by armed military: an active member of FLA, Câmara and his father animated the protest on 6 June, with this popularity, but he always remained isolated and alone in his prison cell;
- Armando Guilherme Goyanes Machad, was arrested in his Rua de Santana home in Ponta Delgada, and was known for his visceral anti-communist leanings;
- Bruno Tavares Carreiro was the son of a historical autonomist, arrested with his father, open independentists and high within the hierarchy of the FLA, he reacted negatively while in prison and proudly criticizing severely the others responsible (particularly Magalhães and Ricou).
- Carlos Eduardo da Silva Melo Bento, a 33 lawyer, was captured after one in the morning, by various soldiers commanded by a sergeant from Ginetes, friend and supporter of Marcelo Caetano's ANP. He was taken from his four children and wife on Rua da Cruz in Ponta Delgada, and imprisoned aboard a lighthouse ship, before being transported to Terceira. Liberated 15 days later, from popular pressure, for several years he was dedicated to Azorean independence, joining FLA for some time: although he had no involvement in the protest, he did support the sentiments of the protesters.
- Commandant Eduardo José Pereira de Almeida Pavão (30 November 1946 – 7 July 1999) was a pilot for SATA Air Açores, and colleague of General Diogo Neto, member of the National Salvation Junta. He was imprisoned after being rounded-up on 10 June (along with Mont'Alverne and Tomás Caetano), around 1:00 in the afternoon by a sergeant and four soldiers. He was a member of the executive council of FLA, when José d'Almeida became its president, to whom he was loyal until his death: all the clandestine actions of FLA was signed off by him, including the protest. He was primarily responsible for the nationalist pamphlet campaign, flying his personal plane and dropping the pamphlets on the island;
- Fernando Manuel Mont'Alverne de Sequeira, also captured during 10 June round-up, he was picked up from his home on Rua de Lisboa, and imprisoned by armed forces at the PSP command post, along with Eduardo Pavão;
- Gualberto Borges Cabral, was an active organizer and proponent of the protest, as well as member of the FLA and right-wing monarchist, played a role in the Movimento Nacionalista Açoriano (Azorean Nationalist Movement). He was arrested at his residence on Rua Coronel Chaves, leaving behind his widowed mother in a state of despair, a fact that he never forgave his accusers.
- Gustavo Manuel Soares Palhinha Moura, journalist for Açoriano Oriental, was arrested after publicizing the acts of the event: he was arrested at night, at his residence along the Estrada Regional da Ribeira Grande;
- João Gago da Câmara, personally wealthy, the enthusiastic independentist, was apprehended at his home on Rua do Castilho; imprisoned, he eventually travelled to the United States, then returned, before holding the office of President of the municipality of Ponta Delgada for 10 years;
- João Luis Soares Reis Índio, a farmer, along with his father and brother, was responsible for requesting the Civil Governor announce his resignation on the balcony of the Palace of Conceição;
- João Manuel Furtado Rodrigues, businessman and farmer, was arrested in the early hours of the morning, along Rua do Colégio; although he eventually went to live in Brazil, his businesses and popular Café LYS were places used by the FLA conspirators;
- Técnico José Joaquim Vaz Monteiro Vasconcelos Franco (1929‑1988), was part of the founding members of the MAPA and FLA, and was arrested at his home on Rua dos Mercadoeres;
- José Manuel Duarte Dominques, was not apparently involved in organizing the protest, he did participate in clandestine independence meetings, in Cabouco, at the home of Paul de La Bletiére, a right-wing Franco-Algerian, but was more known for his graffiti tagged all over São Miguel, even as he defended the cause;
- José Nuno de Almeida e Sousa (1942–1980), a young lawyer, he was a conservative, anti-communist and jurist for the MAPA, arrested at this home on Ladeira de Santa Rita Fajã de Baixo by the army, witnessed by his family;
- Luis Manuel Duarte Domingues, along with his brother, was arrested for their anti-communist acts, and for occupying the regional ERA radio station (later RDP), along with Luís Franco, taking over the installation and broadcasting their manifesto, as well as several episodes of Azorean-flavored music;
- Luis Maria Duarte Moreira (1920–1996), anti-communist, was arrested at his home on Rua dos Manaias, even as he was a continental Portuguese, he defended Azorean independence, joining the "Royal" group, but inevitably living in the United States after the events of the protest;
- Luis Octávio dos Reis Índio, along with his father and brother, was arrested at his home in Pópulo, after participating with the group occupied the radio station, signing the manifesto and involving himself with the LYS group;
- Luis dos Reis índio (1918–1994), along with his sons, he entered the Palace of Conceição to pressure the Governor to resign, and participated in the negotiations with General Altino, at the garrison Fort of São Brás. He was arrested at his home in Pópulo, by a Sergeant and armed soldiers.
- Luís Ricardo Vaz Monteiro Vasconcelos Franco, along with his brother, he was one of the more active protestors: co-author of the groups manifesto, read out at the ERA radio station, and visible on the varanda of the Palace during the Governor's resignation. He was arrested in Atalhada, along Canada das Mercês, at four in the morning;
- Manuel Oliveira da Ponte, one of the organizers, he was arrested at this home along Rua Ilha Terceira in the Bairros Novos area of Ponta Delgada, for his role between José de Almeida and Paul de La Bletiére;
- Manuel da Ponte Tavares Brum (1924–1989), farmer and businessman, he was an active participant in the protest and apprehended at this home on Rua Bernardo Manuel da Silveira Estrela, in Ribeira Seca, for his role in occupying the airport;
- Valdemar de Lima Oliveira, who participated in the occupation of the radio station and the protests, he was present at the negotiations with General Altino, in his role for the MAPA and FLA;
- Tomaz Faria Caetano, a successful Portuguese émigré, Caetano returned from Canada, and constructed a chalet (Mountain Dream) in the hills atop Furnas. He was remembered for being the first to be liberated, owing to his Canadian citizenship, and the fact that he suffered from claustrophobia (forcing his jailers to keep the cell door open) and who wore a white suit, hat and shoes during the protest.
- Victor do Carmo Cruz, the highest-ranking Portuguese representative at the American consulate, who never hid his antipathy for the communists who had influence in the national government, supporting the Azorean manifesto.

In addition, a small band of friends were arrested on Terceira, aligned with the movement: José Manuel Rodrigues dos Santos (from FIAT), José Silvério Bispo (businessman and photographer from Praia da Vitória), Luís Soares Guiod de Castro (aristocrat and businessman from Angra do Heroismo) and Paulo Tadeu Mendes Brum Pacheco. The latter was able to convince his jailers to liberate him for the weekend, so that he could participate as best-man during a wedding.

Many of the arrested maintained a level of optimism and humor, even as there was no certainty that incarceration would be short-term. Although, much later, various detainees publicly assumed responsibility for their participation in subversive acts, their court cases were dismissed without proof and archived.

Meanwhile, the Civil Governor of the Autonomous District of Angra do Heroísmo, Oldemiro Cardoso de Figueiredo, also of the MDP/CDE, resigned a few weeks after the protests, in solidarity with Borges Coutinho. From June to August 1975, there was a rise of terrorist-oriented acts. Various deputies of the MDP/CDE and the PCP were obliged to abandon the Azores in August. The "deportation" of communist supporters to the continent was front-page news in the Diário de Notícias, then a mouthpiece of the government in Lisbon.

=== Autonomy ===
Despite the meaningful political environment on the Continent and the unequivocal condemnation of the demonstration organized by the "reactionary" islanders of São Miguel, the national government, then headed by General Vasco Gonçalves, determined the need to form a Regional Junta of the Azores, to replace the administration of the three districts of the Azores.

The creation of the Regional Junta of the Azores was originally proposed by the Grupo dos Onze (Group of Eleven), presided by former Civil Governor Borges Coutinho (in January 1975).

Though, not attributable to the protests, due to their reactionary nature, the events did not contribute positively to the process of autonomy, which would be discussed in the Constituent Assembly.

Later, antagonisms over the demonstrations only appeared on 19 March 1976, when deputy Vital Moreira (PCP) questioned Américo Natalino de Viveiros (PPD), as to the reason for a statement made, regarding the media of Ponta Delgada. Responding, Natalino de Viveiros stated:

"...the manifestation of 6 June, was to end the dictatorship that was located in the Azores, created by former Governor Borges Coutinho, ruling as a despot...without any respect for the popular will, and that is why this manifestation occurred,...and that is also why there existed those minorities that I mentioned, that could steer the people to take less worthy actions, that were not within the spirit of these populations."

These statements, after the PPD in São Miguel had not campaigned for the resignation of the Civil Governor after the 1975 elections, resulted in a response by Orlando Marques Pinto (MDP/CDE), against the insults made to Borges Coutinho, affirming his "anti-fascist resistant, paid for with many years in prison and permanent humiliation, while I do not know at that time what you "Mr. Deputy" did, with that affirmation."

The writer Christopher de Aguiar described the events of 6 June 1975 in his diary: "It is foolhardy to assume that three or four thousand voices shouting for more to do, in the name of a whole people or an entire island that has more than one hundred thousand inhabitants. This is reminiscent of last century's alevantes (1869) where the people defended the interests of their masters and not their own. Yet, 6 June was also, no exception. Three or four thousand protesters were, for the most part, gathered in rural areas by large landowners, to serve as echo (a sad vocation) to the interests of their lords and masters...Democracy, which cost "the eyes off your face" to be won, sometimes these have perverse effects. Indeed, the active minority that oppress and oppressed the people of São Miguel always existed...it was the same that expressed their side in Ponta Delgada on 6 June."

On 7 June 1978, José António Martins Goulart, leader of the PS parliamentary group in the Regional Legislative Assembly, affirmed:

"6 June...is a date [that affirmed] that nothing is [more] real and important to the people of these islands, and that [they] will have nothing to do with alleged spontaneous popular reactions...Rather, it represents the expression of a single totalitarian threat that was never eradicated from this earth. It represents, after yesterday, another stage of the liberation of a people, that on these islands know how to answer the melancholy of the past."

== Reaction ==
The director of the newspaper Açores, Gustavo Moura, former adherent of the Legião Portuguesa and Acção Nacional Popular, defended the protests, in an editorial in which the principal objective was the support for separatism, was also imprisoned (but he was never tried for his fascist rant nor forced to resign his post). The weekly newspaper O Açoriano Oriental, then directed by Luciano Mota Vieira, was more pragmatic, noting that the Civil Governor had requested to be replaced after the Portuguese Democratic Movement (MDP/CDE) lost local elections, and was demoted by the Minister of the Internal Administration, major António Arnão Metelo. Of the remaining newspapers, the daily Correio dos Açores, with the same fascist slant (and comprising former Salazarists Gaspar Henriques and Manuel Ferreira), supported the protest, as this excerpt suggests (reprinted on 6 June 2010): "...6 June 1975/Grandioso protest/Historic mark in the life of the Azores/Dr. Borges Coutinho requested to resign from the position of Civil Governor of the district...the population protested, in an unsophisticated way, its desire. Thousands of people, hundreds of vehicles, an entire island, raised their voices and, against all prohibitions, organized one of the more grandiose and significant protests in history. The cries of independence soon surpassed all other claims. The grave problems of farming, the demand for the resignation of the district chief, everything quickly became a backdrop to the cries for independence."

Meanwhile the Diário dos Açores and the weekly A Ilha were more pragmatic. The media in Lisbon, in comparison, condemned the protests.

A couple of days later, the same "independence"-oriented commentaries continued to permeate the Correio dos Açores, with characterizations of the psychological, linguistic, cultural, historical and economic differences between the Azores and the continent, justifying a break with Lisbon. Moreover, there was an indication that the social stratification and beliefs that existed between the two regions were distinct enough to talk of an Azorean people, whose moral authority was not convergent with the Portuguese people. This text went on to exclaim: "An exalted word of the moment will follow the words reflected at this historic hour we're living. And this will not be the final word of a few, but of all Azoreans who want it their endeavor and their ability, at present, to make the future."

The Socialist Party (PS), Portuguese Communist Party (PCP), the Portuguese Democratic Movement (MDP/CDE) and the MES condemned the protests, promoting a counter-protest for the following week, on 16 June. The Social Democratic Party (PPD), although a principal supporter of the original protest, also supported the counter-protest, to distance themselves from the subversive acts of 6 June demonstration.

The PS, released a public statement in the newspaper A Capital, in Lisbon, on 12 June 1975, distancing themselves from the "reactionary character that was imprinted on the untimely manifestation, that was so skillfully called for by some farmers on São Miguel...[while supporting]...the strong measures taken by the MFA, to ensure the continuity of the revolutionary process in São Miguel, neutralizing the harmful actions of reactionary minority groups who, treacherously plotted against national sovereignty." At the same time, the PS indicated their antagonism towards the MDP/CDE Civil Governors, named in the rest of the country.

The MDP/CDE, for its part, asked for an "immediate and severe punishment for the peoples responsible for the protest, and for the shameful disrespect that for a while had been verified, and had multiplied, and intensified after the demonstration on 6th."

The Popular Party (then forerunner of the PSD), through some of its more notable speakers, such as Américo Natalino de Viveiros (a militant on the extreme-right of the party, and involved in the protest), affirmed in the official communique:

"The people of São Miguel held a demonstration on 6 June, [with] as we believed, only with the intention of finding a solution to a number of problems, that had been dragging-on without having been resolved by the competent authorities." Referring to the objectives of the protest, the underlined that it was, "only opportunist groups, that distorted the purity of this mass movement, grafting on them the echo of prejudicial slogans harmful to the dignity of the Portuguese people." The PPD affirmed that "no to separatism, though we strive for an autonomous statute", appealing "to people to remain aware of reactionary maneuvering, to organize a popular surveillance and not to allow [this type] of vested interests, be they individuals or groups, or the economic policy of the landlords and property-owners in the district, that want to keep and maintain the exploitative privileges of the people."

It is necessary to understand that the Social Democratic Party was a center-left political party, and candidate for the Socialist International, since its interim leader (in the absence of Francisco Sá Carneiro) the professor Emídio Guerreiro, one of the major personalities of the democratic opposition in Portugal. Meanwhile, on São Miguel, the situation was dissimilar, since the PPD, under João Bosco Mota Amaral, was in practice a conservative and post-fascist party

=== Revisionism ===
Many of the regional right-wing reactionaries, especially those on São Miguel, sought to mystify the importance of the date, suggesting how they allegedly played a major role in bringing about political and administrative autonomy in 1976. But, even as the PS promoted their view in the press of Ponta Delgada, the media was dominated then by journalists linked to the political right, such as Gustavo Moura, who accomplished a lot while heading the Açores much like the Açoriano Oriental.

The Correio dos Açores, which was transformed into an official mouthpiece of PSD reactionary forces and the Micalense extreme-right separatists: during the directorship of Jorge do Nascimento Cabral (between 1981 and 1999), an avowed separatists member of the PSD, and Américo Natalino de Viveiros (after 1999).

Under the direction of Gustavo Moura, the Açoriano Oriental republished a commemorative 25th anniversary edition of the Açores (from 7 June 1975) on 6 June 2000, with the editorial that sent Moura to prison. In comparison, during the 25th anniversary celebrations of the Carnation Revolution, the newspaper never re-published the comparable facsimile celebrating the foundations of the democratic government. On 6 June 2000 editorial, headlined "Unity, An Example Not to Forget", where the author cited the Regional Government of the Azores, under PS leader Carlos César, for marking the protest date, he promoted the alleged "historical dimension" of the events.

For many, though, the date held some importance, as with the proposal by Ponta Delgada councilman Carlos Rego Costa (PSD), who succeeded in having the Rua dos Chagas renamed Rua 6 de Junho (approved in 1979), in direct opposition to opposition members of the Socialist Party (who voted against the measure). Yet, the name persisted and no move was made to replace it, since its adoption. On 29 September 2011, a Facebook page was started to promote the movement to replace the Rua 6 de Junho for Rua Marechal Humberto Delgado in Ponta Delgada, in reverence to the assassinated posthumous-Marshall of the Portuguese Estado Novo state, who was murdered by people associated with the Salazar government.

On 28 May 2012, members of the Frente de Libertação dos Açores (FLA) announced their intention to commemorate the 37 years following 6 June protests, to "show the strength of the Azoreans" and show homage "those who had contributed to liberty". Álvaro Lemos, during a press conference, stated "6 June was the cry of liberation for the Azorean population from a new dictatorship of the left", noting that thousands of people were mobilized on that date in a rare event to force the resignation of the Civil Governor, António Borges Coutinho. The independents' commemorations served to indicate "that autonomy is frayed" and the "disunity of the islands" suggesting that "political parties don't defend the Azores and only look at their navels...[while] autonomy is a certification for the incapacity of Azoreans to govern themselves appropriately."
