= Postage stamps and postal history of the Azores =

Postage stamps and postal history of the Azores surveys the postal history of the Portuguese archipelago, situated in the north Atlantic.

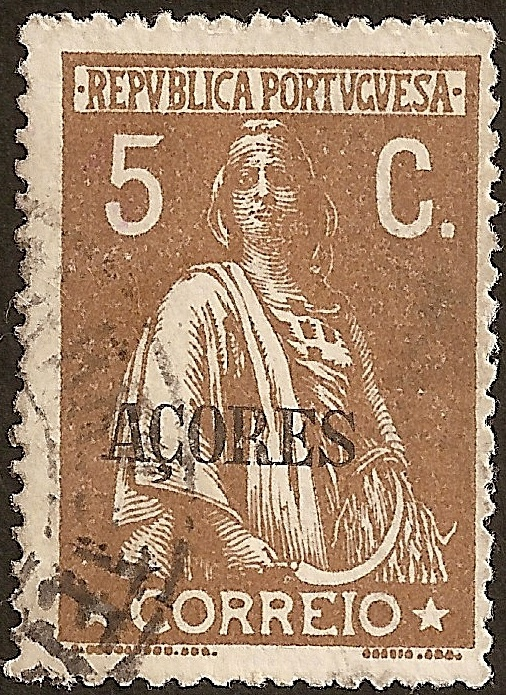
The Ceres series overprinted for the Azores in 1912

== Early history ==
The first stamps used in the Azores were Portuguese stamps issued in 1853 depicting the effigy of Queen D. Maria II, which were designed by Francisco de Borja Freire and printed by the Casa da Moeda. The stamps were inspired by English stamps issued between 1847 and 1848, presenting a bust of the Queen (similar to coin minted in the period) and printed one-by-one in sheets of 24 examples, without perforations and arranged irregularly. The first two stamps (that began circulating on 1 July 1853) had a facial cost of 5 and 25 réis. The following day, issues of 100 réis, and on 22 July 1853, 50 réis were available. Portugal was the 45th nation to adopt the use of postage stamp.

In the Azores, then known as the Ilhas Adjacentes (Adjacent Islands), stamps were cancelled with circular postmark between 1853 and 1869 (referred to as the First Reform) that included numerals corresponding to the localities:

- 48 – Angra do Heroísmo (Terceira)
- 49 – Horta (Fayal)
- 50 – Ponta Delgada (São Miguel)

Between 1869 and 1878 oval postmarks began to be used (the Second Postal Reform), with new postal designations:

- 42 – Angra do Heroísmo (Terceira)
- 43 – Horta (Faial)
- 44 – Ponta Delgada (São Miguel)

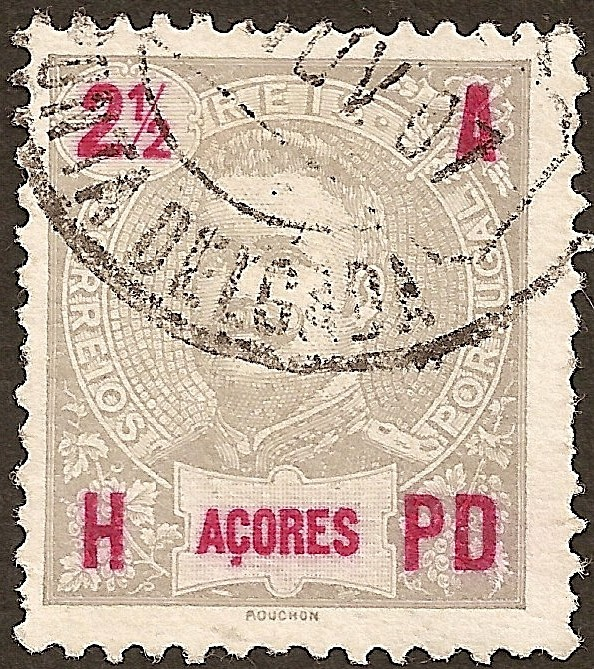
The 1906 King Carlos issue

== Stamp issues ==
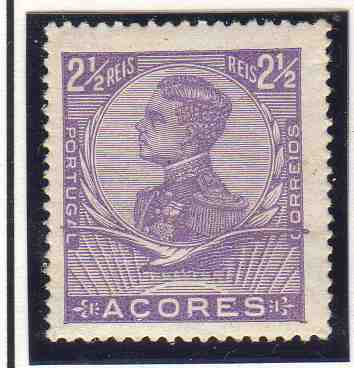
The 1910 King Manuel issue

The first stamps for the Azores appeared in 1868, and continued until 1930. Nearly all of the stamps issued in the Azores were Portuguese stamps overprinted with "AÇORES". The exceptions were the 1898 Vasco da Gama commemorative issue, the 1906 King Carlos issue, and the 1910 King Manuel issue (including revolutionary overprints on the Manuel issue). After 1930, Portuguese stamps were used in the Azores.

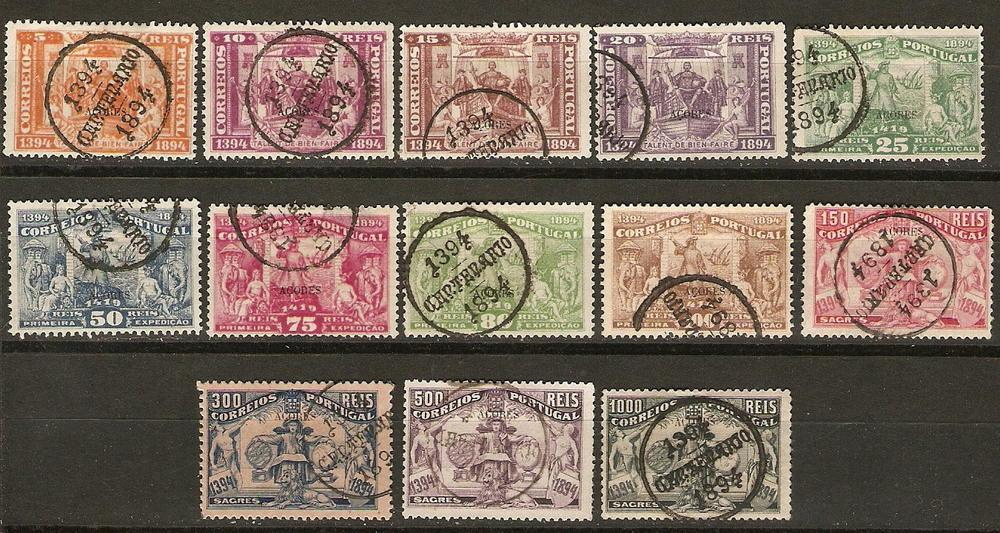
1894 issues

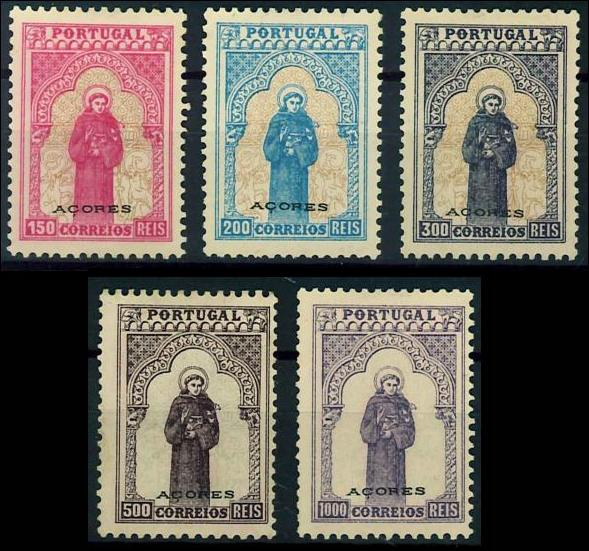
1895 issues

=== District issues ===
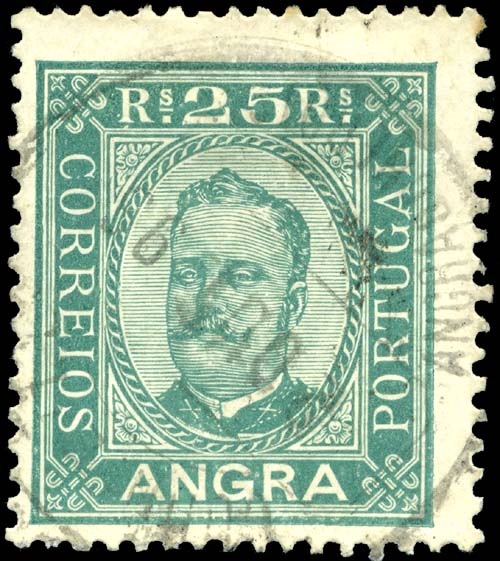
A 25 reis stamp with the image of King D. Carlos, issued in Angra (1892)

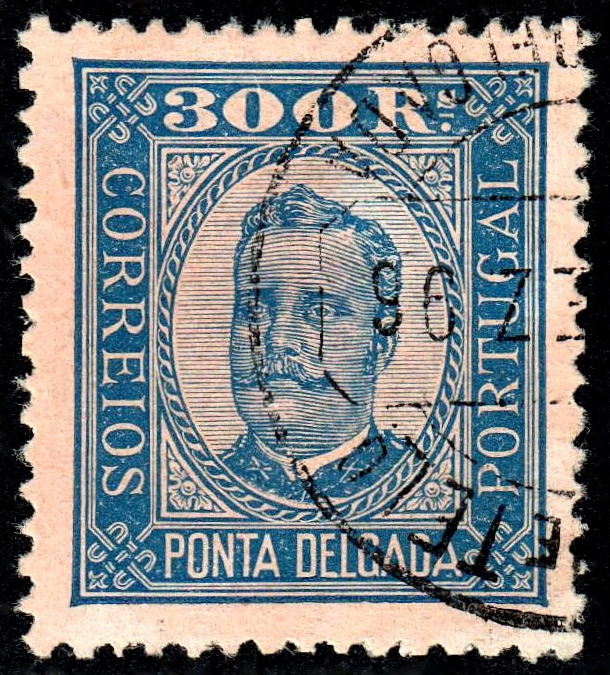
A 25 reis stamp with the image of King D. Carlos, issued in Ponta Delgada (1892)

Between 1892 and 1906, the three administrative districts of the Azores had stamps issued inscribed with their names: Angra, Horta and Ponta Delgada. The designs were identical to those of the regular Portuguese stamps (which were inscribed "CONTINENTE"), with the colors generally the same, although some were lighter or darker.

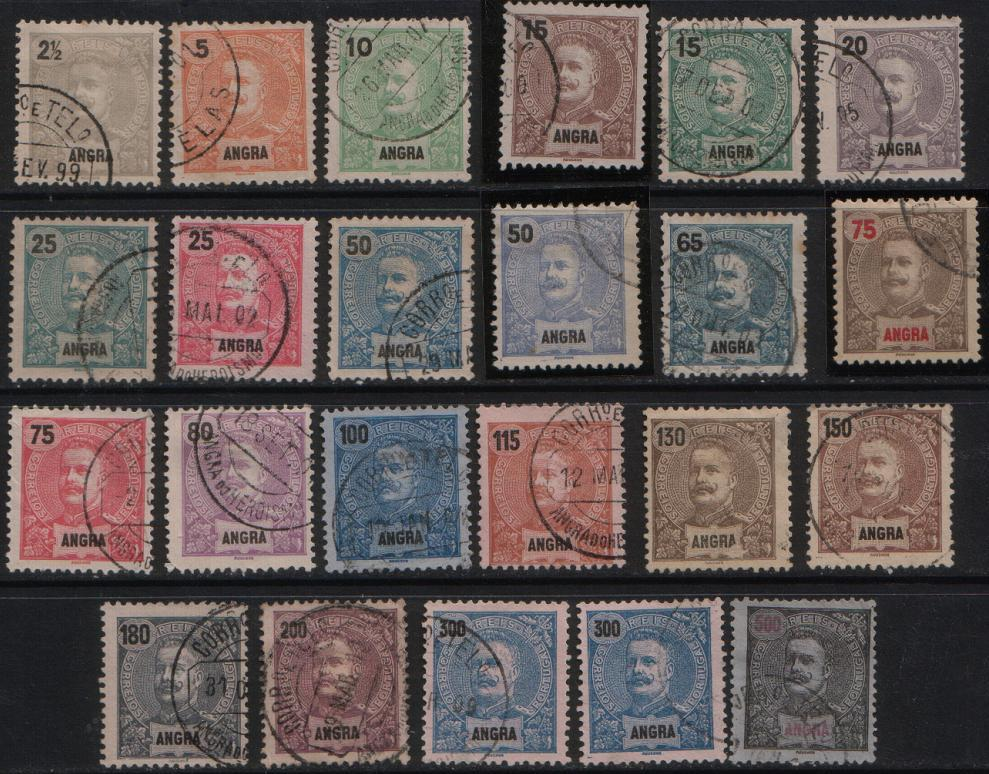
Angra 1897–1905

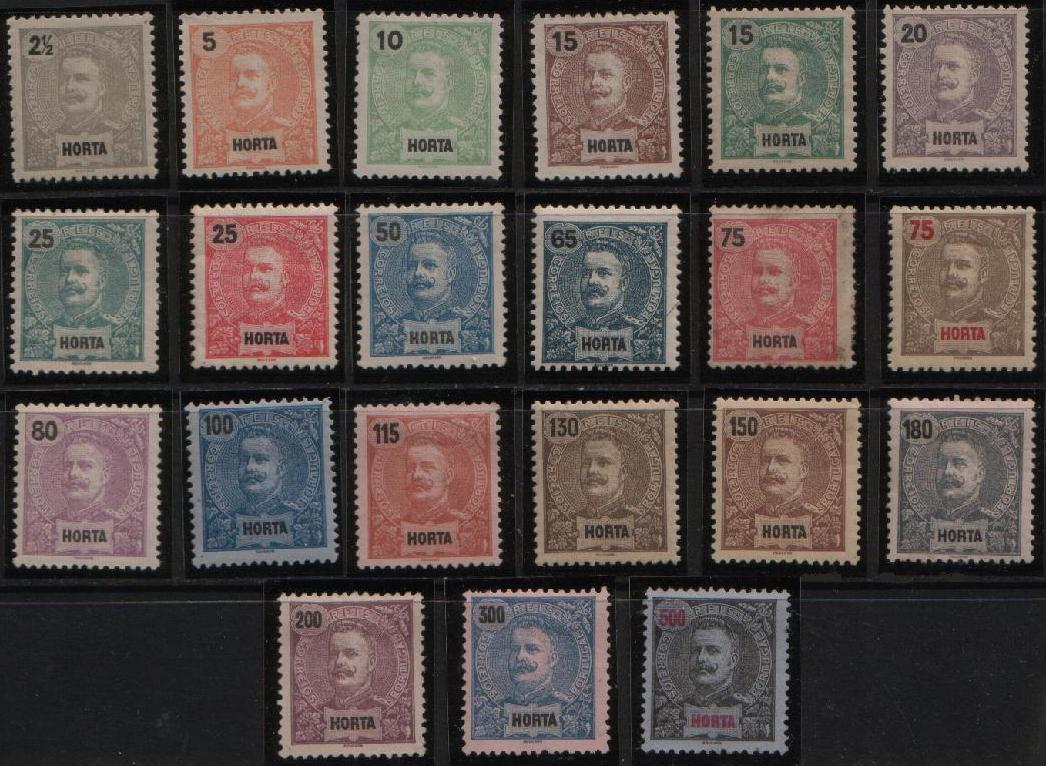
Horta 1897–1905

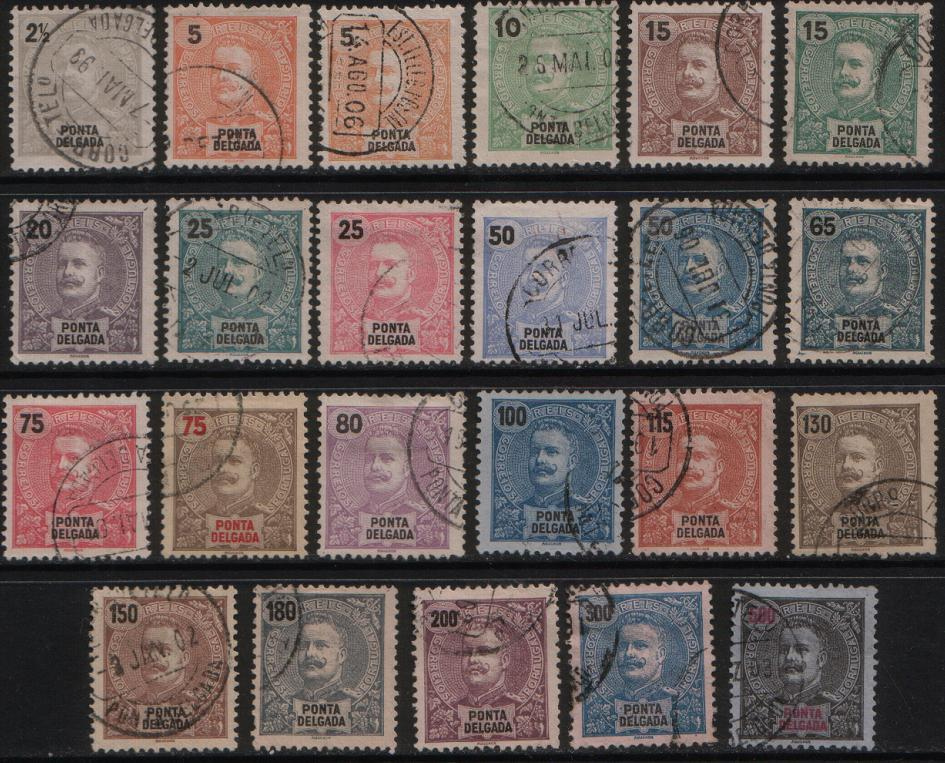
Ponta Delgada 1897–1905

== Modern issues ==
On 2 January 1980, the use of separate stamps for the Azores (and Madeira) were revived. The modern stamps are inscribed both "PORTUGAL" and "AÇORES".

Personalized and regional stamps began to be issued from 2008 by the Portuguese postal service. These stamps have no special purpose beyond the expression of local pride; all are sold and valid in Portugal. About 5–10 are issued each year, generally with themes relating to the Azores.
