= List of countries that have gained independence from Portugal =

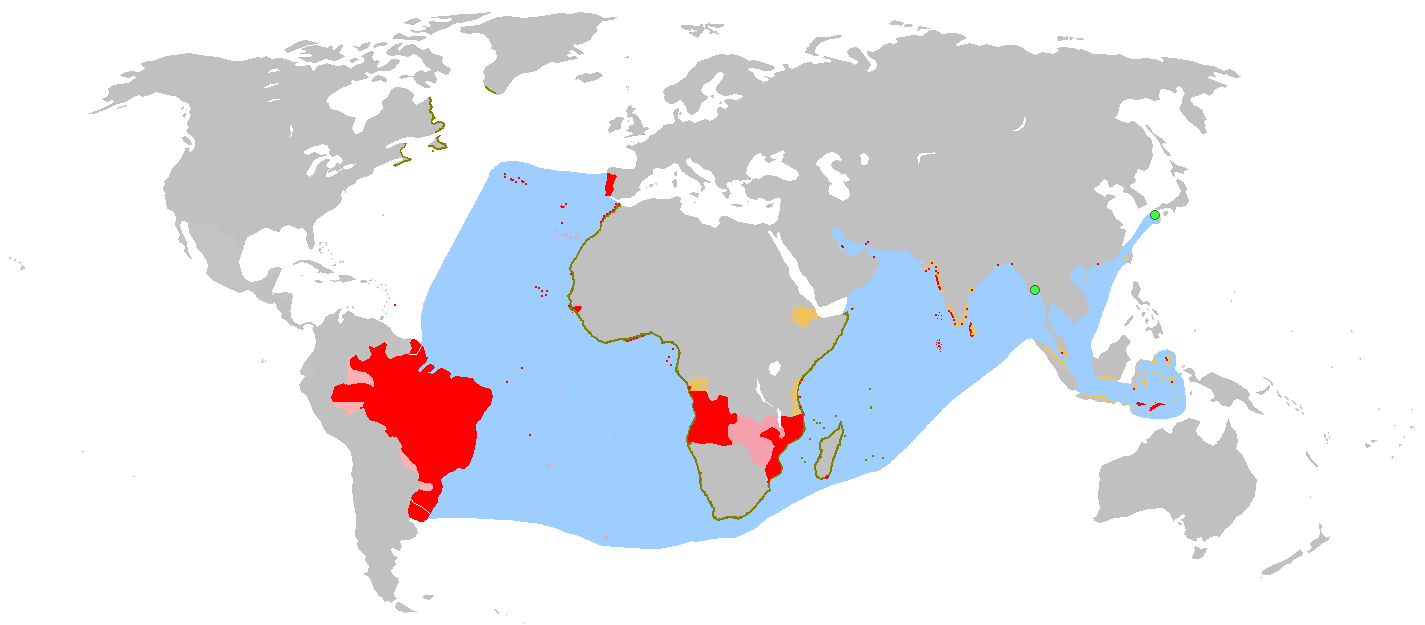
Map showing former land of the empire.

Below are several lists of the countries and territories that were formerly ruled or administered by Portugal or part of the Portuguese Empire at some point in the past. Additional information is provided along with their independence dates that may detail Portugal's recognition of that country's independence or any extenuating circumstances that may have complicated the independence process. These lists are split between official colonies and territories while also detailing any independence efforts that were tried and failed prior to successful independence.

== Colonies and overseas territories ==
Country	Pre-independence name (if different)	Date of independence or first stage		Notes
Country	Pre-independence name (if different)	Day & month	Year	Notes
Brazil	(Portugal) Kingdom of Brazil	29 August	1825	Declared independence under Dom Pedro I on September 7, 1822 but only recognized by Portugal in August 29, 1825 in the Treaty of Rio de Janeiro.
Guinea-Bissau	(Portugal) Portuguese Guinea	10 September	1974	Formally recognized as independent on September 10, 1974.
Angola	(Portugal) Portuguese Angola	11 November	1975	On November 11 NATO declared the independence of the People's Republic of Angola.
Mozambique	(Portugal) Portuguese Mozambique	25 June	1975	Independence for Mozambique was officially declared on June 25, 1975.
Cape Verde	(Portugal) Portuguese Cape Verde	5 July	1975	On 30 June 1975, Cape Verde elected a National Assembly which received the instruments of independence from Portugal on July 5, 1975.
São Tomé and Príncipe	(Portugal) Portuguese São Tomé and Príncipe	12 July	1975	Independence granted on July 12, 1975.
East Timor	(Portugal) Portuguese Timor	20 May	2002	Despite being invaded by Indonesia in 1975, the invasion was not recognized as legal by the United Nations, which continued to regard Portugal as the legal administering power of East Timor. East Timor finally achieved independence in 2002 following a UN-administered transition period.

== Territories ceded to other sovereign states ==
Territory	Recipient state	Date		Notes
Canary Islands	Crown of Castile	4 September	1479	Officially recognized Castilian sovereignty over the Canary Islands in the Treaty of Alcáçovas.
(Portuguese Empire) Bombay	Kingdom of England	Unknown	1661	Marriage Treaty
(Portuguese Empire) Tangier	Kingdom of England	Unknown	1661	Given to king Charles II of England.
(Portuguese Empire) Ceuta	(Spain) Spanish Empire	13 February	1668	Treaty of Lisbon (1668)
(Portuguese Empire) Equatorial Guinea	(Spain) Spanish Empire	26 November	1778	Treaty of El Pardo (1778)
(Portugal) Portuguese Macau	China	20 December	1999	Handover of Macau

== Territories lost through conquest or expulsion ==
Territory	Successor state	Date		Notes
(Portuguese Empire) Tamão	Ming dynasty	8 September	1521	Battle of Tunmen
(Portuguese Empire) Agadir	Saadi Sultanate	September	1541	Fall of Agadir
(Portuguese Empire) Lakshadweep	Natives	Unknown	1545	Expelled by the natives in 1545.
(Portuguese Empire) Malé	Sultanate of Maldives	Unknown	1573	Expelled by Mohamed Thakurufaanu in 1573.
(Portuguese Empire) Bahrain	Safavid Iran	Unknown	1602	Expelled from the island in 1602.
(Portuguese Empire) Insulindia	Dutch East India Company	22 February	1605	Capture of Amboina
(Portuguese Empire) Hormuz	Safavid Iran	4 May	1622	Anglo-Persian capture of Hormuz
(Portuguese Empire) Hooghly	Mughal Empire	24 September	1632	Siege of Hooghly
(Portuguese Empire) Portuguese Malacca	Dutch East India Company	14 January	1641	Siege of Malacca (1641)
(Portuguese Empire) Portuguese Gold Coast	Dutch West India Company	Unknown	1642	Expelled from the region by 1642.
(Portuguese Empire) Portuguese Ceylon	Dutch East India Company	June	1658	Portuguese Ceylon
(Portuguese Empire) Cochin	Dutch East India Company	Unknown	1663	Conquered by the Dutch in 1663.
(Portuguese Empire) Chittagong	Mughal Empire	27 January	1666	Mughal conquest of Chittagong
(Portuguese Empire) Bassein	Maratha Confederacy	16 May	1739	Battle of Vasai
(Portuguese Empire) Chaul	Maratha Confederacy	Unknown	1740	Annexed by the Maratha Confederacy in 1740.
(Portuguese Empire) Mangalore	Kingdom of Mysore	Unknown	1763	Conquered by Hyder Ali in 1763.
(Portuguese Empire) Mazagan	Sultanate of Morocco	11 March	1769	Siege of Mazagan (1769)
(Portugal) Dadra and Nagar Haveli	India	11 August	1954	Annexation of Dadra and Nagar Haveli
(Portugal) Goa, Daman and Diu	India	19 December	1961	Annexation of Goa

== Abandoned territories ==
Territory	Modern-day	Year	Notes
(Portuguese Empire) Newfoundland	Canada	1502	Last expedition in 1502.
(Portuguese Empire) Safi, Azemmour, Alcácer-Ceguer and Asilah	Morocco	1540s	Territories abandoned by King João III in the 1540s.
(Portuguese Empire) Matatana	Madagascar	1553	Last known missions in 1553.
(Portuguese Empire) Cape Breton	Canada	1570	Fishing colony last mentioned in 1570.

== Unsuccessful independence and resistance movements ==
Territory	Date		Notes
Minas Gerais	Unknown	1789	Inconfidência Mineira
Pernambucan rebels	Unknown	1817	Pernambucan revolt
(Portugal) Goa (India) Satyagraha	15 August	1955	Satyagraha movement in Goa
Azores; FLA	6 June	1975	6 June 1975 Micalense Farmers' Protest
Madeira; FLAMA	1975	1978	Movement dissolved in 1978.
