= Districts of Portugal =

District
- Category: 1st-level administrative division
- Location: Portugal
- Created: 1835
- Number: 18
- Populations: 108,485 (Portalegre District)–2,655,832 (Lisbon District)
- Areas: 2,255–10,225 km^{2}
- Government: None
- Subdivisions: Municipality; Parish

The districts (Portuguese: distritos) are the most important first-level administrative subdivisions of continental Portugal. Currently, mainland Portugal is divided into 18 districts.

As an administrative division, each district serves mainly as the area of jurisdiction, having previously had a civil governor who acted as the local delegate of the Central Government of Portugal, a post extinguished in 2011.

== Overview ==
The Districts of Portugal were established by a royal decree of 18 July 1835. On the Portuguese mainland, they correspond to the current districts, with the exception of Setúbal District, which is the result of a split of Lisbon District in 1926. This decree did not affect the then extensive colonial empire.

The 1976 Portuguese Constitution specifies that Portugal has only, as first-level divisions, the autonomous regions (Azores and Madeira) and the administrative regions (to be created in mainland Portugal). According to the Constitution, the districts shall be disestablished in territories in which an autonomous or administrative region has been created.

The districts were abolished in Azores and Madeira in 1976, when the autonomous regions were created. In 1998, a proposal was submitted to referendum to create eight administrative regions in mainland Portugal, and so to extinguish the districts. The proposal was rejected at the ballot box and so the districts continued to exist in mainland Portugal. Despite their abolition in the autonomous regions, the areas of the three former districts of Azores are still used as areas of jurisdiction of some government and non-government entities, like the district finance directorates (Tax Authority regional offices) and the district football championships.

However, the importance of the districts has been decreasing. In recent years, some administrative, financial and political competencies have been delivered to the CCDRs (Comissão de Coordenação e Desenvolvimento Regional, English: Commission for Regional Coordination and Development) and to the municipalities, to the detriment of the districts. In 2003, the Portuguese municipalities were allowed to organize themselves into intermunicipal communities (comunidades intermunicipais) and metropolitan areas (áreas metropolitanas), which allowed for a lessening in the importance of the districts.

Also, the abolition of the districts is a subject that returned to discussion in Portuguese society. In 2009, during the campaign for the legislative election of 2009, the leader of the Socialist Party, José Sócrates, promised a new referendum to the administrative regions and therefore, the abolition of districts, if he won the election. Other personalities support the creation of administrative regions and therefore the abolition of districts.

Despite being in the process of being phased out by the decentralisation policies of the government, the districts still remain the most relevant subdivision in the country by serving as a basis for a series of administrative divisions such as electoral constituencies, police, and civil protection regional commands; sports district associations; and championships.

On September 8, 2011, a decree from the Portuguese Government de facto extinguished all the offices of civil governor by transferring most of their functions to other bodies. As the existence of the civil governors is still included in the Portuguese Constitution, its de jure extinction may occur only after a constitutional amendment.

== Present purpose ==
In mainland Portugal, for administrative purposes, the districts are still used as the areas of jurisdiction of the local branches and field offices of several Government ministries and agencies. Some of the bodies that have each district as their jurisdiction area are:

- District and metropolitan commands of the Public Security Police;
- Territorial commands of the Portuguese National Republican Guard;
- District rescue operations commands of the National Civil Protection Authority;
- Finance directorates of the Ministry of Finance / Tax and Customs Authority (in this case, including the former districts of Azores, that are still used as the jurisdiction areas for the three finance directorates existing in this autonomous region);
- District Social Security centers of the Portuguese Social Security;
- District motor vehicle delegations of the Mobility and Land Transports Institute;
- District archives of the Directorate-General of Archives;
- Regional delegations of the Estradas de Portugal (Road Agency).

Furthermore:

- The area of each of the 18 electoral constituencies (círculo eleitoral, electoral circle) of mainland Portugal coincides with the area of each district;
- In the new judicial division of Portugal, the area of each of the comarcas (first instance judicial districts) of mainland Portugal coincides with the area of an administrative district (with the exception of the comarcas of Greater Lisbon and Greater Porto).

For non-Government purposes, the districts are used as the area of jurisdiction of many entities, including:

- The regional organizations of the major political parties,
- The regional organizations of most of the Portuguese sports federations (football, athletics, roller skating, etc.) and its district championships (including the three former districts of Açores);
- Regional federations of trade unions;
- District delegations of the Institutions of Engineers.

== List ==
District	Municipalities	Parishes	Pop. (2021)	Pop. (2025)	Area (km^{2})	Density (/km^{2})
Azores (autonomous region)	19	156	236,413	245,328	2,322	106
Aveiro	19	174	700,787	748,716	2,798	268
Beja	14	84	144,401	169,810	10,229	17
Braga	14	371	846,293	901,282	2,706	333
Bragança	12	226	122,804	123,642	6,608	19
Castelo Branco	11	128	177,962	189,090	6,675	28
Coimbra	17	161	408,551	438,242	3,947	111
Évora	14	75	152,444	161,642	7,393	22
Faro	16	76	467,343	578,032	4,960	117
Guarda	14	245	142,974	138,823	5,518	25
Leiria	16	116	458,605	514,503	3,505	147
Lisbon	16	141	2,275,385	2,655,832	2,761	962
Madeira (autonomous region)	11	54	250,744	266,130	801	332
Portalegre	15	72	104,923	108,485	6,065	18
Porto	18	275	1,785,405	1,906,626	2,408	792
Santarém	21	150	424,973	469,361	6,747	70
Setúbal	13	60	874,806	1,012,127	5,064	200
Viana do Castelo	10	213	231,266	244,343	2,255	108
Vila Real	14	200	185,695	187,197	4,328	43
Viseu	24	282	351,292	364,820	5,007	73
Total Portugal	308	3,259	10,343,066	11,424,031	92,097	124

== Former districts of Portugal ==
=== Azores ===
- Angra do Heroísmo District – 1835 to 1976
- Horta District – 1835 to 1976
- Ponta Delgada District – 1835 to 1976

=== Madeira ===
- Funchal District – 1835 to 1976

=== Mainland Portugal ===
- Lamego District – in 1835 only. Renamed into Viseu District that year.

== Former districts of the Portuguese overseas provinces ==
Following the model of European Portugal, the major Portuguese overseas territories (Angola, Mozambique and Portuguese India) were also divided in districts. In these territories, each district was headed by a district governor, subordinated to the governor-general. In Angola and Mozambique, the former district areas mostly coincide with the modern province areas. In the former Portuguese India, the Damão and Diu districts are still divisions of the present union territory of Daman and Diu, while the present state of Goa (former Goa District) is now divided into two districts.

=== Angola ===
- Bengo
- Benguela District
- Bié
- Cabinda
- Cuando-Cubango District
- Cuanza Norte District
- Cuanza Sul District
- Cunene
- Huambo District
- Huíla
- Luanda District
- Lunda Norte District
- Lunda Sul District
- Malanje District
- Moxico
- Moçâmedes District
- Uíge District
- Zaire District

=== Mozambique ===
- Niassa District
- Cabo Delgado District
- Nampula District
- Zambézia District
- Tete District
- Manica District
- Sofala District
- Gaza District
- Inhambane District
- Lourenço Marques District

=== Portuguese India ===
- Goa District
- Damão District
- Diu District

== See also ==
- Ranked list of Portuguese districts
- Subdivisions of Portugal
