= João Soares de Albergaria de Sousa =

Portuguese politician, property owner, and author

João Soares de Albergaria de Sousa (Velas, São Jorge, 16 January 1776–Velas, São Jorge, 1 February 1875), frequently referred to as João Soares de Albergaria, was a liberal politician, rural landowner, and author of the 1822 manifesto Corografia Açórica, the first thesis on Azorean regional sovereignty.

== Biography ==
João Soares de Albergaria de Sousa was born on 16 January 1776 in Velas, São Jorge Island, in the Portuguese archipelago of the Azores. He was the oldest son of Inácio Soares de Albergaria e Sousa—a militia colonel—and Isabel Delfina da Silveira Pereira de Lemos, members of the rural aristocracy and rich property owners on São Jorge. He attended school in Velas. He joined the local militia, attaining the rank of ensign in 1814. In 1818 at the age of 42, he traveled to the Royal Court in Rio de Janeiro in an attempt to obtain royal confirmation of privileges and titles for his family.

=== Liberal politician ===
Albergaria de Sousa remained at the Royal Court until the beginning of 1820, then traveled to Lisbon, arriving in Portugal as the Liberal Revolution began in Porto. He encountered the formation of the Constituent Cortes of 1820, a parliamentary group debating Portugal's form of government in the post-Napoleonic Era. Albergaria de Sousa became involved in the politics of Lisbon, becoming a member of the Sociedade Patriótica Filantropia ("Patriotic Philanthropic Society") and congregating with a likeminded group of Azoreans who were participating in the Cortes. He ultimately assumed this Azorean group's leadership and helped instill in it the notion that the Portuguese Constitution of 1822 could introduce a new democratic government in the Azores that would abandon the old colonial administration and system imposed by the Captaincy-General of the Azores.

During this period he collaborated with three other elected deputies and intellectuals on what would become the Corografia Açórica, ou Descripção Phísica, Política e Histórica dos Açores, por um cidadão açorense, M. da Sociedade Patriótica Phylantropya n'os Açores. This document flowed from his political conversations and constituted a clear manifesto of the political orientation of the Azorean members of the Cortes. The document argued for Azorean autonomy. In Lisbon, conversations on how this was to be achieved fragmented into internal disputes between members of each island (especially those from São Miguel, Faial, and Terceira). Reconciliation proved elusive and Albergaria de Sousa remained in Lisbon until 1827 before returning to São Jorge, where he assumed his place in his family's business.

=== Liberal traitor ===
The situation changed in 1828, when the Liberal cause came under attack. On 16 May 1828 Miguel I of Portugal was acclaimed absolute king by monarchist counter-revolutionaries in opposition to the Liberal constitution in Angra do Heroísmo. João Soares was now on the losing side of the political climate.

The Captain-General of Angra, Manuel Vieira de Albuquerque Touvar, ordered all residents of the Azores to pay homage and express fealty to the new monarch. When the ship carrying the orders arrived in Velas on 11 June 1828 (as part of its declaration in the "lower islands"), the authorities encountered residents hesitant to accept the orders. Soares de Albergaria pressured military governor José Maurício Rodrigues to delay any meeting. Finally, on 15 June, an improvised meeting was called but Soares de Albergaria (as the head of several local Liberals) argued the orders should come from a Royal Decree, and not the Captain-General. Through his eloquent style and influence, Soares de Albergaria was able to impede the declaration. A few days later, on 22 June, a revolt in Angra by the 5th Battalion proclaimed Terceira's fealty to "D. Maria da Glória and her illustrious father Sir D. Pedro," but it was not a complete victory since pockets of resistance on Terceira and some forces on the island of São Miguel still remained loyal to Miguel. The government in São Miguel finally received a formal Royal Decree ordering the acclamation of D. Miguel, and liberals on São Jorge accepted the call on 28 October 1828. Soares de Albergaria participated in this acclamation meeting and swore loyalty to the crown under military duress, as the military governor had sent troops to the island to guarantee their loyalty. Later, for this action João Soares's political adversaries would accuse him of cowardice.

Owing to his power and local influence, Soares de Albergaria escaped an immediate sanction of treason. However, on 4 March 1829, a decree arrived in the hands of magistrate Francisco José Pacheco demanding the punishment of those responsible for fomenting resistance to the new king (including Freemasons), causing the systematic arrest of many liberals on 6 November 1829. As author of the Corografia Açórica and member of the Constituent Cortes of 1820, Soares de Albergaria could not publicly defend himself, was detained on 14 November, and sent to Ponta Delgada where a special tribunal had been established to punish seditious liberals. Summarily judged, he was sentenced to five years in Angola. His sentence was commuted on 25 May to five years in Elvas prison, and he was transported there on 25 June 1830. Between 1830 and 1834 he remained imprisoned in Elvas—and later Almeida—suffering harsh conditions while his properties at home were confiscated and sold off at bargain rates.

=== Later life ===
Albergaria de Sousa achieved freedom in 1834 when troops under the Duke of Terceira captured prisons and released their prisoners. He returned to São Jorge in 1835, encountering his possessions in disorder; his properties were returned in terrible condition. Ironically, he returned to a municipality where many of his enemies were in power in the municipal offices as respectable "liberals". Soares de Albergaria would begin a political career to the left of these "liberals" in the Septemberist Revolution (1836–1842) and the Partido Histórico. He became a legislative representative in 1837 and 1838 in support of the revolution and new constitution. He held many posts in municipal government and supported the charitable works of the local Santa Casa da Misericórdia das Velas ("Holy House of Mercy of Velas").

After a prolonged sickness he died on 1 February 1875 in Velas, short of his 100th birthday.

== Published work ==
Corografia Açórica, ou Descripção Phísica, Política e Histórica dos Açores, por um cidadão açorense, M. da Sociedade Patriótica Phylantropya n'os Açores (Lisbon, Impressão de João Nunes Esteves, 133 pp., 1822), was Albergaria de Sousa's most important contribution to the history of the Azores. Since its initial publication, it has been reedited and republished twice: in 1975 by the quasi-fascist, Azorean separatist group FLA (Frente de Libertação dos Açores); and in 1995 by the Jornal da Cultura publishing house with updated graphics and a preface by José Guilherme Reis Leite (ISBN 9727550134).
