= Regional Junta of the Azores =

Year-long provisional governing body of the Azores

Regional Junta of the Azores Junta Regional dos Açores

History
- Founded: August 22, 1975
- Disbanded: September 8, 1976
- Succeeded by: 1st Regional Legislature

Leadership
- President: Altino Pinto de Magalhães

Structure
- Seats: 43
- Legislative Assembly political groups: Socialist Party, Social Democratic Party, Independent

Elections
- Legislative Assembly voting system: Nomination
- Voting system: Party-list proportional representation D'Hondt method
- Last Legislative Assembly election: N/A

Meeting place
- Angra do Heroísmo, Terceira (Azores), Portugal

The Regional Junta of the Azores (Portuguese: Junta Regional dos Açores) was the governing body created under Decree-Law 458-B/75 (22 August 1975), to substitute the Civil Governors of the autonomous districts of Ponta Delgada, Angra do Heroísmo and Horta and their individual General Juntas (Portuguese: Juntas Gerais). The Regional Junta was initially proposed by the Group of 11 (Portuguese: Grupo dos Onze, presided by the Civil Governor of the autonomous district of Ponta Delgada, António Borges Coutinho, in January 1975. Ironically, its creation was attributed to the events on 6 June 1975. The Regional Junta of the Azores governed for little more than a year, between 22 August 1975 and 8 September 1976.

== History ==
Until the 19th century, the governing bodies of the Azores and Madeira were independent entities and treated as overseas territories by the national government in Lisbon.

After 2 March 1895, the Azores and Madeira began to operate as autonomous territories of Portugal, and was institutionalized in the Portuguese Constitution. The Azores functioned as autonomous districts under the administration of district General Juntas, the upper-tier institution responsible for fiscal policy and with the competencies to manage the regional economy. In practice, though, the Azores was abandoned politically and neglected from development programs, with emigration becoming the only "exit strategy" for local overcapacity and poverty. This autonomy and economic status remained until 1974. Yet, progressively, after 1910, many of these territory's rights and responsibilities were gradually reduced.

== Regional government ==
The Regional Junta functioned as a dependency of the Prime Minister and was composed of a president and six representatives. The Military Governor of the Azores was by default the president of the Regional Junta, with the representatives nominated by the national government. The other members of this organ included representatives for:

- Economic coordination;
- Local administration, equipment and the environment;
- Social services, work and emigration;
- Education and scientific investigation, social communication and culture;
- Agriculture, fishing and industry;
- Transport, commerce, communication and tourism.

The Governing Junta of the Azores (Portuguese: Junta Governativa dos Açores) was nominated on 22 August 1975, and presided by Altino Amadeu Pinto de Magalhães, who at that time was the Military Governor. Representatives were selected from between political personalities of great importance, from the electoral results of the April 1975 Constituent Assembly, that included:

- Assuntos Sociais, Trabalho e Emigração (Social Services, Work and Emigration)

Henrique Aguiar Rodrigues (PPD).

- Coordenação Económica e Finanças (Economic and Financial Coordination)

José Adriano Borges de Carvalho, later substituted for Dr. Álvaro Pereira da Silva Leal Monjardino (PPD).

- Transportes, Comércio, Comunicações e Turismo (Transport, Commerce, Communication and Tourism)

José Pacheco de Almeida (PPD).

- Educação, Investigação Científica, Comunicação Social e Cultura (Education, Scientific Investigation, Social Communication and Culture)

José António Martins Goulart (PS).

- Administração Local, Equipamento Social e Ambiente (Local Administration, Social Equipment and Environment)

Leonildo Garcia Vargas (PS).

- Agricultura, Pescas e Indústria (Agriculture, Fishing and Industry)

António de Albuquerque Jácome Corrêa (Independent).

The Regional Junta was the provisional government in the Azores, which tried to resolve many of urgent problems in the region, in addition to begin the process of administrative and political unification, following 150 years of the effects of the district system.

Among some of its relevant tasks, the Regional Junta established a commission that elaborated the judicial statuate that established Azorean autonomy. The multi-party commission elaborated a counter-proposal that, even today, was considered polemic: the political equalization of voting power between islands and decentralization of governmental departments. From this proposal, the redistribution of electoral seats between the nine electoral circles (representing the nine islands) using a mixed system. This integrated model provided for a minimum number of representatives (two) and an additional representative for each 7500 registered voters, or greater than 1000. This allowed each island to have at least two elected representatives and that the island of São Miguel (with 54% of the population) could never have more than 50% of the elected seats. Within each mandate (each island) the distribution of seats would be made by the Hondt method, which benefited minorities.

The Regional Junta was extinguished with the establishment of the first Regional Government of the Azores, on 9 September 1976, wherein all the competencies, property and responsibilities were transferred to its title.
