= Corografia Açórica =

First political document supporting Azorean autonomy

Corografia Açórica is a political document first published in 1822. Its full title is Corographia Açorica, ou Descripção Phísica, Política e Histórica dos Açores, por um cidadão açorense, M. da Sociedade Patriótica Phylantropya n'os Açores (literally, Azorean Chorography or Physical, Political and Historic Descriptions of the Azores for the Azorean Citizen by the Patriotic Philanthropic Society in the Azores). It was written in 1822 by Azorean politician João Soares de Albergaria de Sousa and is considered the first political manifestation of Azorean sovereignty or autonomy relative to the Kingdom of Portugal.

The 133-page manifesto first appeared in Lisbon in 1822–João Soares de Albergaria de Sousa lived there at the time—where it was published by João Nunes Esteves. In 1975, Rainer Daehnhardt of the separatist Frente de Libertação dos Açores created 500 copies of the document. A more recent 1995 edition released by the publisher Jornal de Cultura in Ponta Delgada has a preface by José Guilherme Reis Leite.

== Themes ==
Apart from its descriptions of history and geographical contexts, the document is a political manifesto. Generally, it proposes solutions for social and class issues in Azorean society and traces the origins of the pro-regional autonomy position that emerged in the 19th century. The author demonstrated a liberal conviction that was politically radical for the time. He proposed a political ideology "against absolutism and despotism". The social groups most referenced by the author were the "traditionally dominant classes":

...the stupid, tepid, and above all incapable, the noble class and especially the military class.

He extended his "criticisms to the intellectual class", in particular to lawyers, public magistrates, and businessmen, but spared the working class.

The middle class is the depository of principal virtues: moderate by habit, very laborious, the propensity for all professional arts, in particular as seamen.

The "farmer or rural class" is eulogized for its "excellent qualities". According to the author, these people also had deficiencies:

[they're] little patriotic, and very superstitious, because they still live in ignorance.

Portuguese historian Maria Isabel João suggests Albergaria de Sousa believed this ignorance was caused by despotism and lack of education. Public education in the form practiced in the Azores of the time was miserable: there were no secondary schools and educational institutions provided few social services. The idea of the "Fatherland" in Albergaria de Sousa's Corographia Açorica reflects the conception most common during that era: a person's birthplace, and in the context of the Azores, the island where they were born. The patriot, therefore, is a person who demonstrates the capacity to defend their territory. The text refers various times to the "general interest of the Fatherland" when talking about the Azores, and uses the term "Government of the Fatherland" to designate local Azorean governments. Maria Isabel João writes that the notion of the Azores and Azoreans as a separate nation and nationality permeates the Corographia Açorica. The idea of integrating the Azores into the larger Portuguese nation is not present in the document.

The author refers to "colonies and metropoles" to express the idea of slavery or servitude of Azoreans to the Kingdom of Portugal. He believes a lack of patriotism renders Azoreans passive. It is clear that the Corographia articulates three basic concepts: Fatherland, colony, and metropole. However, it does not contain the modern concepts of a separatist manifesto. First, the concept of Fatherland is limited to tradition, and does not connote opposition to Portuguese nationalism. Second, the terms metropole and colony, although common during the era, had different meanings. On 26 February 1771, the Azores were designated a province of Portugal, but the administration continued to be exercised by the State, as was the case for other colonial possessions.
