= Ranked list of Portuguese districts =

Portugal has 18 districts and 2 autonomous regions (Azores and Madeira). Population figures are from the 2021 census.

== By population ==
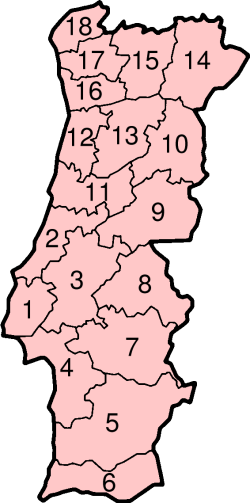
Map of Districts of Portugal

| Rank | District | Population | % | Population Density |
|---|---|---|---|---|
| 1 | Lisbon (1) | 2,275,385 | 22.0% | 824.1 |
| 2 | Porto (16) | 1,785,405 | 17.3% | 745.5 |
| 3 | Setúbal (4) | 874,806 | 8.5% | 172.8 |
| 4 | Braga (17) | 846,293 | 8.2% | 316.6 |
| 5 | Aveiro (12) | 700,787 | 6.8% | 249.6 |
| 6 | Faro (6) | 467,343 | 4.5% | 94.2 |
| 7 | Leiria (2) | 458,605 | 4.4% | 130.5 |
| 8 | Santarém (3) | 424,973 | 4.1% | 63.0 |
| 9 | Coimbra (11) | 408,551 | 3.9% | 103.5 |
| 10 | Viseu (13) | 351,292 | 3.4% | 70.2 |
| 11 | Madeira | 250,744 | 2.4% | 314.6 |
| 12 | Azores | 236,413 | 2.3% | 101.3 |
| 13 | Viana do Castelo (18) | 231,266 | 2.2% | 102.6 |
| 14 | Vila Real (15) | 185,695 | 1.8% | 42.9 |
| 15 | Castelo Branco (9) | 177,962 | 1.7% | 26.7 |
| 16 | Évora (7) | 152,444 | 1.5% | 20.6 |
| 17 | Beja (5) | 144,401 | 1.4% | 14.1 |
| 18 | Guarda (10) | 142,974 | 1.4% | 25.9 |
| 19 | Bragança (14) | 122,804 | 1.2% | 18.6 |
| 20 | Portalegre (8) | 104,923 | 1.0% | 17.3 |
| | Portugal | 10,343,066 | 100% | 112.3 |

== By area ==
| Rank | District | Area (km²) | % | Population Density |
|---|---|---|---|---|
| 1 | Beja (5) | 10,255 | 11.1% | 14.1 |
| 2 | Évora (7) | 7,393 | 8.0% | 20.6 |
| 3 | Santarém (3) | 6,747 | 7.3% | 63.0 |
| 4 | Castelo Branco (9) | 6,675 | 7.2% | 26.7 |
| 5 | Bragança (14) | 6,608 | 7.2% | 18.6 |
| 6 | Portalegre (8) | 6,065 | 6.6% | 17.3 |
| 7 | Guarda (10) | 5,518 | 6.0% | 25.9 |
| 8 | Setúbal (4) | 5,064 | 5.5% | 172.8 |
| 9 | Viseu (13) | 5,007 | 5.4% | 70.2 |
| 10 | Faro (6) | 4,960 | 5.4% | 94.2 |
| 11 | Vila Real (15) | 4,328 | 4.7% | 42.9 |
| 12 | Coimbra (11) | 3,947 | 4.3% | 103.5 |
| 13 | Leiria (2) | 3,515 | 3.8% | 130.5 |
| 14 | Aveiro (12) | 2,808 | 3.0% | 249.6 |
| 15 | Lisbon (1) | 2,761 | 3.0% | 824.1 |
| 16 | Braga (17) | 2,673 | 2.9% | 316.6 |
| 17 | Porto (16) | 2,395 | 2.6% | 745.5 |
| 18 | Azores | 2,333 | 2.5% | 101.3 |
| 19 | Viana do Castelo (18) | 2,255 | 2.4% | 102.6 |
| 20 | Madeira | 797 | 0.9% | 314.6 |
| | Portugal | 92,104 | 100% | 112.3 |

== By population density ==
| Rank | District | Population | Area (km²) | Population Density |
|---|---|---|---|---|
| 1 | Lisbon (1) | 2,275,385 | 2,761 | 824.1 |
| 2 | Porto (16) | 1,785,405 | 2,395 | 745.5 |
| 3 | Braga (17) | 846,293 | 2,673 | 316.6 |
| 4 | Madeira | 250,744 | 797 | 314.6 |
| 5 | Aveiro (12) | 700,787 | 2,808 | 249.6 |
| 6 | Setúbal (4) | 874,806 | 5,064 | 172.8 |
| 7 | Leiria (2) | 458,605 | 3,515 | 130.5 |
| 8 | Coimbra (11) | 408,551 | 3,947 | 103.5 |
| 9 | Viana do Castelo (18) | 231,266 | 2,255 | 102.6 |
| 10 | Azores | 236,413 | 2,333 | 101.3 |
| 11 | Faro (6) | 467,343 | 4,960 | 94.2 |
| 12 | Viseu (13) | 351,292 | 5,007 | 70.2 |
| 13 | Santarém (3) | 424,973 | 6,747 | 63.0 |
| 14 | Vila Real (15) | 185,695 | 4,328 | 42.9 |
| 15 | Castelo Branco (9) | 177,962 | 6,675 | 26.7 |
| 16 | Guarda (10) | 142,974 | 5,518 | 25.9 |
| 17 | Évora (7) | 152,444 | 7,393 | 20.6 |
| 18 | Bragança (14) | 122,804 | 6,608 | 18.6 |
| 19 | Portalegre (8) | 104,923 | 6,065 | 17.3 |
| 20 | Beja (5) | 144,401 | 10,255 | 14.1 |
| | Portugal | 10,343,066 | 92,104 | 112.3 |
