= António Borges Coutinho =

Portuguese lawyer (1923–2011)

António Borges Countinho

Civil Governor of the Autonomous District of Ponta Delgada
- In office 21 August 1974 – 6 June 1975
- Preceded by: António Joaquim da Fonseca
- Succeeded by: -
- Constituency: Autonomous District of Ponta Delgada

Personal details
- Born: António Eduardo Borges Coutinho de Medeiros; 3 May 1923 Lisbon, Portugal
- Died: 3 February 2011 (aged 87) Lisbon, Portugal
- Citizenship: Portuguese
- Party: Oposição Democrática (MDP/CDE)

António Borges Coutinho GOL (3 May 1923 in Lisbon – 3 February 2011 in Lisbon) was a Portuguese lawyer and politician.

== Biography ==
António Eduardo Borges Coutinho de Medeiros was born in Lisbon on 3 May 1923, the second son of the third Marquis of Praia e Monforte. He was the youngest brother of Duarte Borges Coutinho, who was president of sports club S.L. Benfica.

He obtain his degree in Law, from the Faculty of Law, at the University of Coimbra in 1948, but was not associated with the Democratic Opposition during his university career.

=== Career ===
In 1950, he settled in São Miguel, becoming an intern with lawyer Carlos Bettencourt. His political indoctrination and ideology was influenced by the socialist António Sérgio and theories of Agostinho da Silva. During a difficult political era, he was the sole member of the District Commission to support the presidential candidacy of General Humberto Delgado, in 1958, obtaining 4.8% of the votes in the district of Ponta Delgada.

He was imprisoned in 1961, after trying to alert public opinion to the true significance of the caso Santa Maria, through inscriptions on walls. It was at this time that he became a member of the district Oposição Democrática, along with Melo Antunes, during the thaw in Marcelista spring of 1969.

He became a member of the Portuguese Democratic Movement in the National Assembly, for the district of Ponta Delgada, in 1969, along with Manuel Barbosa and João Silvestre Pacheco (obtaining 22.2% of the votes, the best results for an opposition, candidates). He was a candidate in 1973 election, but the list of candidates were disqualified due to irregularities.

=== Civil Governor ===
He was selected to be Civil Governor of the Autonomous District of Ponta Delgada, following the Carnation Revolution (25 April 1974). He took office on 21 August 1974, succeeding the Madeirense Augusto Branco Camacho, who had been in the post since 1950.

In January 1975, he joined the Grupo dos Onze (Group of 11), with elements of the Social Democratic Party, Socialist Party and Portuguese Democratic Movement, who developed an autonomy project for the Azores, presupposing the Junta Regional.

But, after the clamorous defeat of the Portuguese Democratic Movement in the constituent assembly elections that occurred on 25 April 1975, he presented himself at the disposal the minister of Internal Administration (Portuguese: Ministro da Administração Interna), major António Arnão Metelo, who insisted he remained and continued in his position.

One of his principal objectives, along with the President of the Junta Geral, the Faialense Álvaro Soares de Melo, was the implementation of the Lei do Arrendamento Rural (Rural Landrent Law), a rental property law for agriculture that protected renters from the arbitrary and unjust practices of property-owners.

These policies lead to the 6 June 1975 Micalense Farmers' Protest, that was organized by his political adversaries, many linked to the old regime. Unsupported by the Military Governor of the Azores, General Altino Pinto de Magalhães, during negotiations with protesters, he was forced to publicly resign on the balcony of the Palace of Conceição.

=== Later life ===
Following his stay in the Azores, he established his residence in São João do Estoril, maintaining links to regional and national politics. Although not a Marxist he became an active follower of the PCP in 1978, and between 1977 and 1979 became director of the Leftist newspaper Farol das Ilhas, in Lisbon.

On 3 September 2001 he received the title of Grand Official of the Order of Liberty (Ordem da Liberdade).

António Borges Coutinho died in Lisbon, on 3 February 2011.

Notice of his death appeared on the bottom of the last page of the Açoriano Oriental in the Azores. Similarly, condolences left by the Legislative Regional Assembly of the Azores, was not approved by majority, with the Socialist Party, Social Democratic Party, Left Bloc and PPM approving and the People's Party, under the direction of Artur Lima, abstaining. The same acts of condolence for Jorge do Nascimento Cabral of the Social Democratic Party, who supported separatism for the Azores in the regional parliament the year earlier, was approved by majority.
