= Madeira Archipelago Liberation Front =

Portuguese paramilitary organisation

- Frente de Libertação do Arquipélago da Madeira
- FLAMA's flag
- Dates active: 1975-1978
- Country: Portugal
- Ideology: Anti-communism; Madeiran separatism
- Political position: Right-wing to far-right
- Status: Extinct
- Wars: PREC

The Madeira Archipelago Liberation Front (Portuguese: Frente de Libertação do Arquipélago da Madeira), or FLAMA (which could be read as an archaic Portuguese word for "flame", flama), was a right-wing paramilitary organisation from Madeira, whose main goal was to achieve Madeira's independence from mainland Portugal.

== History ==
FLAMA carried out around 200 bomb attacks between 1974 and 1976, during the revolutionary period that followed the Portuguese Carnation Revolution (April 25, 1974). The Carnation Revolution effectively changed the Portuguese regime from an authoritarian dictatorship (the Estado Novo) to a democracy (the Third Republic), but only after two years of a transitional period known as PREC (Processo Revolucionário Em Curso, Portuguese for Ongoing Revolutionary Process), characterized by social turmoil and power disputes between left- and right-wing political forces. During this period the new government withdrew from Angola and Mozambique, the last Portuguese colonies in continental Africa. Some in Madeira thought that their area should be the next to separate.

FLAMA's demands were more a right-wing political reaction by some of the regional elites to the left-wing nature of the Revolution and its main actors, than a truly ethnic or nationalist separatist goal. The group is thought to have been made up of young, anti-communist students.

A similar group in the Azores Archipelago, called Frente de Libertação dos Açores, established contact in October 1975. After the normalization of the Portuguese political system, early in 1976, and the constitutional grant of autonomy to the Portuguese North Atlantic archipelagos of Madeira and Azores, the organization slowed down. However, the end of the organization is thought to have taken place in 1978, which was confirmed by one of its most prominent members Daniel Drumont, "The movement ended in 1978, (...) when Portugal was walking towards a communist dictatorship, but now it's extinct".

=== Known members ===
- João Batista de Sá
- João Costa Miranda
- José Carvalho
- Daniel Drumond

João Costa Miranda and Daniel Drumond are still vocal about FLAMA's recent controversies, trying to dissociated themselves from recent events, but after the end of the organisation in 1978, their names and roles were not known and so no legal prosecution was pursued. Afterwards, the members have recused themselves from the bombings, stating that "there were people who made use of FLAMA's brand".

José Carvalho, an outspoken ex-director of FLAMA, died in 2018.

== Flag ==
The FLAMA flag is composed of a blue-yellow-blue vertical triband, and in the yellow sections there are five small shields. The blue represents the environment that characterizes the island and represents nobility and serenity. The yellow mirrors the climate of the Archipelago, a symbol of richness, strength, faith and purity. The five shields, which are also present in the Portuguese flag stand for the five wounds of Christ (Portuguese: Cinco Chagas de Cristo) when crucified, and are typically associated with the legend in which Count Afonso Henriques (future Afonso I) "killed the five Moorish kings of the Seville, Badajoz, Elvas, Évora and Beja taifas. Hence, in gratitude to Jesus, he incorporated five shields arranged in a cross—representing his divine-led victory over the five enemy kings—with each one carrying Christ's five wounds in the form of silver bezants. The sum of all bezants (doubling the ones in the central shield) would give thirty, symbolizing Judas Iscarot's thirty pieces of silver".

The flag was first raised on 20 July 1975, in FLAMA's first high-profile act.

== Main events ==
On 20 July 1975, FLAMA's first high-profile action took place when several walls in Funchal, Madeira's main city, were sprayed with phrases and expressions such as "Independence for Madeira" and "Out With The Portuguese", which FLAMA's signature at the bottom. One of the common expressions in the graffiti that became FLAMA's signature action, was the expression "Cubans" to describe the mainland Portuguese. This came from the fact that Otelo Saraiva de Carvalho, a well-known Portuguese military officer and main strategist of the 1974 Carnation Revolution, was an admirer of Fidel Castro's communist policies in Cuba.

In the beginning of August 1975, FLAMA released several statements in which it promised violent acts in case no action was taken to start the process of independence. The expression "Friday, it's João's birthday" (Portuguese: "Sexta-feira, o João faz anos") was supposed to be a code for violent acts that were going to be taken. As a response, Madeira's military forces launched operation "Happy Birthday" (Portuguese: parabéns), in which 200 military officers and police officers were given orders to find the group. At 2:45am of 9 August, a Saturday, a bomb attack was perpetrated and its target was the national news station, Emissora Nacional. The attackers made use of 200 grams of dynamite, but the attack did not cause much damage and was intended to serve as a warning.

On 23 August, FLAMA struck Emissora Nacional once again, and at 3:16am, a bomb exploded at its headquarters in Funchal. The organization stated that it viewed the news station as "leftist propaganda". Following that attack, whose main aim was to neutralize the electronic equipment of the station and therefore stop the news casting, a series of other attacks followed. Less than 24 hours later, another explosion took place at a bakery. The next bomb attack took place on 29 August, when a car from a well known politically left-oriented banker was the target of the explosion. On that same day, FLAMA releases pamphlets stating its intentions to start a provisional government of Madeira and asking for the recognition of FLAMA "as the true representative of the will of Madeira's people". However, the director of FLAMA at the time, José Carvalho, has stated that the move was "pure propaganda". Another attack followed, in the morning of 31 August, when another banker's car, João Abel Azevedo, was the target of the bomb attack. This attack led to the detention of a number of suspects by the local police forces, and when the news of the detentions was released on 2 September, FLAMA retaliated and a firecracker was thrown at São Lourenço Palace.

One of FLAMA's most controversial moments however, came on the night of 28 August, when 6 young men aged 15 to 17 sprayed slogans in support of FLAMA and Madeira's independence on the walls of a tourist complex named Matur, located in the municipality of Machico. They were detained by the police forces, due to the security cameras at the site, and once the news spread regarding their detention, there was popular outrage against their actions. However, as minors, they were released, but the event, which captured significant media attention, became known as the "Popular Trial of Machico".

A demonstration against FLAMA and its actions was called on 18 September, and it turned into a protest against independence with banners reading "Death to FLAMA". The following morning, two firecrackers were fired, the attacks were perpetrated by FLAMA, the first aimed at a car, the second bomb aimed at the house of a known syndicalist on the island. Several attacks took place in the following days, and after an occupation of another news broadcaster by a group of expatriates who had returned to Portugal following the war for independence of Angola and Mozambique and who demanded higher standards of living. Three more attacks took place on 10, 12, 15 and 21 October.

After establishing contact with FLA, FLAMA's boldest attack took place on November 13. At the Santa Catarina airport, there were three planes, including a military aircraft called Noratlas of the Portuguese Air Force. At the time, there were rumors that the military plane was supposed to carry a sum of money out of Madeira and to the mainland, and at 4:10, a bomb exploded under the plane's cockpit, which caused significant damage to the plane and a fire at the airport. No suspects were detained due to lack of evidence.

After a period of conversation and turmoil on the mainland, where elections had just taken place and plans of institutional autonomy for the Azores, FLAMA was behind another attack which took place on 14 January 1976. This was followed on 19 February by the visit of José Baptista Pinheiro de Azevedo, Prime Minister at the time, to start the talks with the local governmental authorities regarding the region's autonomy. On 20 February, following an explosion on a road in which the car of the Prime-Minister was passing, the documents granting a provisional government to the region of Madeira were signed.

Although FLAMA's activities became more sparse, the organization was still active. In the following months, merchandise featuring FLAMA's flag was distributed along with a new currency named "zarco", which was supposed to act as Madeira's new currency. On 24 March, FLAMA decided to take on a political and organized approach, and so the Political Association of the Madeira Archipelago was founded.

On 2 April, the Portuguese Constitution was approved in the Parliament, and in it, there were 10 articles which granted political and administrative autonomy to the Azores and Madeira.

FLAMA's most complex operation of the time took place in June. Involving 25 people and a bomb weighing 12 kilograms of gelignite, the bomb was placed under a bridge in Água-de-Pena, whose target was the then presidential candidate Otelo Saraiva de Carvalho. However, the bomb was defused when it was known that a bus of 20 children would be travelling with the commission travelling with the presidential candidate at the time.

Following several strikes at the beginning of 1977 due to the delays in the transfer of administrative powers to the regional governments and the visit of then President Ramalho Eanes, another bomb was placed on 26 August in the offices of the Portuguese National Airline, TAP. While other minor incidents followed that one, arson became the new FLAMA strategy. The targets were the cars of university professors, syndicalists, members of parliament and journalists. However, this new phase of FLAMA "escaped the control" of the directory members, with one member in particular setting fires which were no longer under FLAMA's ideological motivations. He was identified as Eduardo Mendonça.

At the end of 1977, the Portuguese Judiciary Police (from the Portuguese: Polícia Judiciária) counted 14 bombings in Madeira, perpetrated by FLAMA.

On 15 February 1978, 3 suspects were detained and accused of terrorism and 219 objects used in bombing devices were found. As a reaction to the detentions, FLAMA left two firecrackers in the Palace of Justice (Portuguese: Palácio da Justiça) in Funchal. On 5 April, two police officers and two tourists were injured in a car explosion set by FLAMA.

FLAMA's first deadly attack took place on 23 August 1978, when a car bomb was set and the 19 year-old operational, João Alberto, who was installing it was killed. Another member, Alírio Paulo Fernandes, committed suicide while detained by the police. However, suicide was never confirmed as the cause of death which led to protests during his funeral, where independents accused the police of abuse of power. Following this event, FLAMA dispersed and there are no more records of any bombings.

== Recent controversies ==
While it is said in multiple sources that the organization vanished due to its diminishing importance after 1976 and the establishment of Madeira as an autonomous region, recent news indicates the opposite.

Allegedly one of FLAMA's most important activists was the controversial Alberto João Jardim, the former President of the regional government of Madeira, co-founder of the Madeiran branch of the popular centre-right-wing Portuguese party PSD and former Vice-president of the European People's Party. However, he has denied any connection to FLAMA, stating that “contrary to what my political adversaries have accused me of- it's not that FLAMA was dishonourable, on the contrary actually-, I not only have never belonged to its organizations, as I also never established any contact with them. Everyone had their role in defending democracy. Mine was ensuring the survival of PSD and of Madeira's Newspaper.” This accusation is supported by a photo in which Albert João Jardim is wearing a shirt that states "Madeira, my Homeland".

On 1 July 2011, the Region's Autonomy Day, fifty FLAMA flags were raised in several locations across the islands, and a statement was released claiming once again the Archipelago's independence. The statement released to the press was the following: “Today, 1 July 2011, the day of the autonomy that doesn't deserve to be celebrated, Madeira's people woke up to an archipelago “dressed up” with its flag, and, after 35 years, it is a good time to reflect on what FLAMA has always proposed and what was accepted with open arms by some and questioned by others". This was followed by a member of Parliament, António Fontes, displaying a FLAMA flag in Parliament to prove that displaying such a flag was a crime, as that was the “flag of bombs”.

== Successor movement ==
In 1997, the Forum for Madeira's Autonomy, or FAMA (Portuguese: Fórum para a Autonomia da Madeira), was created, which advocated for more autonomy. Although they rejected FLAMA's claims for independence, one of its members, Jaime Ramos, stated “Total autonomy” in reference to the archipelago. The organization was dissolved in October 2015.

In 2014, the Scottish Referendum for independence, revived the conversation about the Archipelago's independence. In Funchal, FLAMA's president, Gabriel Drumond, reaffirmed that the Madeira people have the right to be free from Portugal and that “no one could, democratically, stop them from holding a referendum”. Alberto João Jardim questioned “What has the Portuguese State given to Madeira so far, or what has it promised to Madeira?”.
