= Diário dos Açores =

- Type: Daily newspaper
- Format: Berliner
- Founder: Manuel Augusto Tavares de Resende
- Founded: 5 February 1870
- Language: Portuguese
- Website: www.diariodosacores.pt

The Diário dos Açores (Diary of the Azores) is a Portuguese-language newspaper, and one of the oldest daily newspapers in the Azores, having been published continuously from 5 February 1870 to the present.

== History ==
The Diário dos Açores was founded by Manuel Augusto Tavares de Resende (1849-1892) in 1870, influenced by the publication five years before, in Lisbon of the Diário de Notícias. He headed the newspaper until his death in 1892. Tavares de Resende was a "self-made man", who began as a typographer, then bought his own printing press and began the Diário, becoming a pioneer in the Azores with his dedication and innovation.

Operating a daily newspaper was difficult (previous newspapers had been fortnightly) not only in technical terms, but also because, from a monetary point of view, many people thought the enterprise would fail. In an environment where literacy was poor, it was difficult to providing a constant circulation, with limited graphics capabilities and limited overseas news sources. To attract subscribers and readers, Tavares de Resende offered gifts and cash through a lottery. He also set up a network of correspondents throughout the island of São Miguel, the Azores archipelago, and outside the region.

By the beginning of the 20th century, the Diário dos Açores was already situated along a line of traditional 19th century journalism. The paper was journalistically compromised, not just ideologically oriented or supporter of defined political parties, but that its role was political. The paper obtained much of its prestige from progressive supporters of local monarchist intelligentsia.

In 1892 when Tavares de Resende died, his nephew Manuel Resende Carreiro (? - 1939) succeeded him as director, remaining for the next 47 years, during which time he introduced the children's supplement Miau in 1934, which introduced many readers to the newspaper.

During the tenure of Manuel and Carlos (Manuel's brother) Carreiro, the Diário dos Açores witnessed a renaissance. The newspaper was the first São Miguel newspaper to use mechanical composition, introducing the Intertype machine in 1965, and by 1970 two such machines were in use. The Carreiro brothers also had the honour of preparing the commemorative edition, Bodas de Diamante, in 1945, which according to many surpassed the best special editions of the metropolitan newspapers.

In 1970 Manuel Cabral de Melo wrote a special supplement commemorating the newspaper's centennial.

== Notes ==
Notes

Sources

- "Pág. Diário dos Açores na Enciclopédia". TioSam.com. Archived from the original on 4 February 2013.
- Tavares, Conceição; Carneiro, Ana; Diogo, Maria Paula; Simões, Ana (28–30 May 2009), "A imagem pública das Ciências e da Tecnologia na Imprensa Portuguesa (1900-1901)", A História da Imprensa e a Imprensa na História (PDF) (in Portuguese), University of the Azors
