= Correio dos Açores =

Portuguese newspaper in the Azores

- Type: Daily newspaper
- Format: Berliner
- Owner(s): Gráfica Açoreana, Lda.
- Founder(s): Francisco Luís Tavares; José Bruno Tavares Carreiro
- Publisher: Gráfica Açoreana, Lda.
- Editor-in-chief: Santos Narciso
- Editor: Américo Natalino Viveiros
- Associate editor: João Paz
- Photo editor: Pedro Monteiro
- Founded: May 1, 1920
- Political alignment: Portuguese Republican Party
- Language: Portuguese
- Headquarters: Rua Dr. João Francisco de Sousa, 14; Ponta Delgada (Azores), Portugal
- Circulation: 4600
- Website: www.correiodosacores.pt

Correio dos Açores (Azores Post) is a Portuguese newspaper, published daily from Ponta Delgada, in the archipelago of the Azores.

== History ==
The periodical had its beginnings in the founding of the newspaper República, established 1910 by Republican sympathizers in the city of Ponta Delgada, following the establishment of the First Portuguese Republic. The republican Francisco Luís Tavares was the director of this newspaper, and after nine years, on 1 May 1920, along with the monarchist Dr. José Bruno Tavares Carreiro founded the Correio dos Açores, maintiaing a similar editorial style:

"...patent to the public the guidance of the new authorities and their motivation towards the successive problems derived from the national and international evolution."

It was a period of ideological confrontations within the First Republic, especially leading to the First World War, when Republicans and nationalists were divided about the direction the young democracy should follow. The newspaper was also the principal Azorean organ involved in the "Autonomy Campaign of 1924-1928", finding itself the centre of various currents of opinion, and whose editors consisted of members of the Azorean elite. Among its collaborators were the autonomist Aristides Moreira da Mota and Montalverne Sequeira, the newspaper's director José Bruno Carreiro, and partners from the other islands, including Luís da Silva Ribeiro and Alfredo Mendonça (from the island of Terceira), musician Francisco Lacerda (from the island of São Jorge), and from the continent Luís Ataíde and Linhares de Lima.

Those who were involved in the newspaper organized the Visita dos Intelectuais (Visit of the Intellectuals) to the archipelago in 1924. Similarly, its members contributed to the Autonomy Decree of 16 February 1928, that suggested a small decentralization of services to the Junta Geral do Distrito Autónomo de Ponta Delgada. Within the same context, it launched an appeal to Madeira autonomists, in order to vet ideal opinions, to which the Madeiran press responded with the editorial A Madeira quer.

With the establishment of the Estado Novo, the Correio defended the unity and autonomy of the Azores. Through its mobilization of public opinion, the paper mounted the first Azorean Congress in 1938, in order to "delineate a project of unity for the islands".

Following the Carnation Revolution, the headquarters of the paper was occupied in 1975 by its workers, who would go on to work in partnership with the newspaper. Eventually, in 1976, the newspaper was purchased by a group of individuals that included Américo Natalino Viveiros, who become director.

== See also ==
- List of newspapers in Portugal
