= Azores Liberation Front =

Portuguese political party

- Frente de Libertação dos Açores
- The flag used by the FLA
- Other name: FLA
- Leader: Rui Medeiros
- Founded: 8 April 1975
- Country: Azores (Portugal)
- Ideology: Separatism; Nationalism; Anti-communism
- Size: >100

The Azores Liberation Front, more commonly known as the FLA (Portuguese: Frente de Libertação dos Açores) was a right-wing paramilitary organization with the goal of forceful independence of the Azores, appearing right after the Carnation Revolution and whose actions included violent attacks on political opponents in 1975. It has remained a dormant organization since, with occasional press releases on political issues of the islands.

In 2006 Rui Medeiros became president of the group, and has stated in a 2016 interview that the group is no longer pursuing violent means. Medeiros claims that the group has a membership in the hundreds. The founder of the group, José de Almeida, died in 2014.

== History ==
The FLA was founded by José de Almeida in London, on April 8, 1975. Almeida, a former representative of the Acção Nacional Popular (English: Popular National Action Party) in the National Assembly, modeled his actions on the Madeira Archipelago Liberation Front (FLAMA).

The Azorean independentistas are not 'Che Guevaras'. It is not ideology that motivates us, we never fell to that temptation. What mobilizes us is the Azores and remains the Azores.

— José de Almeida

In the beginning, the movement was responsible for violent intimidation tactics groups or organizations counter to their own political sensibilities.Although it was supported by the local merchants and entrepreneurs on the island of São Miguel, fearful of the possible nationalization of businesses, the group was sociologically popular with the agrarian-classes on the island, having its origin in the seigneur system of inheritances that had existed in the archipelago during its settlement. There was some fear that the lean towards socialism on the continent would result in the loss of land rights and personal possessions in a presumed collectivization. As the Portuguese communist party accumulated more power, fear of Portugal becoming a pro-Soviet puppet state started to grow and was nourished by the right-wing political movements. Around the same time, the tumultuous transition to democracy (with its nationalization policies) became very unpopular among Azorean farmers and industrialists, mostly from São Miguel island who organized themselves to resist the "red danger".

From an economic perspective, the FLA based their success on a future re-negotiation of the air base lease in Lajes, Terceira and the use of geothermal energy to maintain their local economy, during the initial isolation following a declaration of independence and economic support from the Azorean diaspora. Even though the organization gained some support for some time, it was virtually dead by the end of the 70's. Autonomy was granted to the Azores and Madeira (where a similar organization existed, the Madeira Archipelago Liberation Front) by the Constitution of 1976, cooling the explosive situation, and the communist threat was slowly eroding.

=== Recognition ===
José de Almeida attempted repeatedly to negotiate with the U.S. Department of State, in order to gauge support for Azorean independence in the administration. Unfortunately for the FLA, after November 25th the proposal was rejected by the administration as unrealistic. Covert actions of the Frente de Libertação dos Açores were possible, though, through nascent support.

=== Protest ===
Members of the FLA in Ponta Delgada, along with right-leaning members of the PPD and CDS and property-owners hoping to cause a change in government policy, associated with price of milk, meat, canned goods and potential agrarian reform, organized a protest on the 6 June 1975. Rapidly, the protest degenerated and the crowd marched on the Palace of Conceição, to demand the resignation of Civil Governor António Borges Coutinho, with cries of "Viva a Independência" and "A FLA basta para o MFA" heard. The Military Governor, General Altino Pinto de Magalhães did not intervene in the protests and the Governor resigned. What became known as the Micalense Farmers' Protest was the first political success for the members of the Front, but was short-lived: within a period of 24 hours members of the FLA, as well as sympathizers, were rounded-up throughout the islands and imprisoned. They were eventually released and prosecutions were dropped through lack of evidence. The protests would lead to the establishment of the Regional Junta of the Azores.

On 12 August, members of the FLA stated that the movement would use violence in order to obtain its objectives of an independent archipelago. The group then approved several internal motions to force the transfer of members of the PCP and their sympathizers (including 3 parish priest) off the islands. Already, the movement had created a military far-right wing, during a meeting in the Canaries, even as they had indicated their desire to abandon the armed struggle if Portugal followed the Grupo dos Nove. A day later (19 August 1975) the headquarters of the PCP in Ponta Delgada and PCP MDP/CDE and MES in Angra do Heroísmo were destroyed.

By 21 October, the FLA was denounced by their critics as acting with impunity on the islands of Terceira and São Miguel, with the support of civil and military authorities. Around this time the FLA's manifesto was proclaimed across the Radio Clube in Angra, resulting in some citizens banding together to create an Esquadrão da Noite for self-defense against the FLA.

=== Decline and subsequent revival ===
Even though the organization gained support for some time, it entered a state of dormancy beginning in the late 1970s. Autonomy was granted to the Azores and Madeira (where a similar organization existed) by the Constitution of 1976, cooling the explosive situation, and the communist threat slowly eroded. The geo-political strategic importance of the Azores continues to be debated by regional and international interests. The FLA elected a new president in 2006, Rui Medeiros. The group began to make press statements regarding various political issues on the islands. Medeiros stated in an interview that "armed combat today would make no sense," and wishes for the group to be represented as a political party. It is still a clandestine organization, and has not disclosed its membership numbers, though Medeiros claimed that the FLA consists of "hundreds" of members.

Owing to economic issues resulting from the Portuguese financial crisis, during the late 20th century and early 21st century, FLA graffiti began to appear in many of the islands of the archipelago. Although not a political support of the party, the graffiti was seen as an anti-establishment instigation by youth and party faithful.
