= Açoriano Oriental =

- Front page, 11 June 2013
- Type: Daily newspaper
- Format: Berliner
- Owner(s): Açormédia, S.A.
- Founder: Manuel Vasconcelos
- Publisher: Impraçor
- Editor: Luís Pedro Silva
- Managing editor: Ana Carvalho Melo
- Founded: 18 April 1835; 191 years ago
- Language: Portuguese
- Headquarters: Rua Dr. Bruno Tavares Carreiro, 34/36; Ponta Delgada (Azores), Portugal
- Circulation: 3,662 (2010)
- ISSN: 0874-8705
- Website: www.acorianooriental.pt

Açoriano Oriental (meaning The Eastern Azorean in English) is a Portuguese language newspaper published daily from Ponta Delgada, in the archipelago of the Azores, Portugal.

== History and profile ==
The Açoriano Oriental was founded on 18 April 1835, a period when national and international newspapers dominated public communication. It was its founder, Manuel António de Vasconcelos, born in Pilar da Bretanha, who first decided to publish a weekly newspaper with a regional character for the island of São Miguel, which mixed the public service and community aspects with politics and journalism.

Manuel António was a liberal, and a vigorous defender of his principles, who used his paper as a vehicle for political battles that occurred on the national stage in the period. It was a combative and debate-oriented newspaper that supported the principles espoused by the constitutional monarchists of the time, while supporting the local agrarian populous on the island. Four months prior to founding of the Açoriano Oriental, the first law that addressed press freedoms were introduced in Portugal; Manuel António de Vasconcelos quickly established his paper to take advantage of these public liberties.

Over the next 175 years, the paper took on various forms, aligning itself to political idealism on the island, and reinvented itself during periods of crisis. Manuel Ferreira de Almeida, for over thirty years and with great sacrifice, maintained the Açoriano Oriental in publication, until it was eventually acquired by Impraçor, when on 1 January 1979 it became a daily newspaper.

In November 1996, the Açoriano Oriental was integrated into Açormedia, consisting of the original shareholders of Impraçor and Grupo Lusomundo, dominated by Controlinveste Media (today the majority stakeholder).

Its local role and several years of publication, provided it with the honour of the oldest Portuguese newspaper, one of the ten oldest continuously published daily newspapers and longest surviving papers by name. These accolades allowed the newspaper to be recognized by the Portuguese State in 1999, with the honorary membership to the Order of Prince Henry.

In 2011, US President Barack Obama invited the members of Açoriano Oriental to participate at the commemorative ceremonies at the annual 11 September ceremonies: the invitation was extended to a select number of newspapers worldwide.

== Circulation ==
The circulation of Açoriano Oriental was 3,945 copies in 2009 and 3,662 copies in 2010.

== See also ==
- List of newspapers in Portugal
