= Altino Pinto de Magalhães =

Portuguese politician (1922–2019)

Altino Amadeu Pinto de Magalhães

President of the Regional Junta of the Azores
- In office 22 August 1975 – 29 August 1976
- Preceded by: Office created
- Succeeded by: Mota Amaral (as President of the Government of the Azores)

Military Governor of the Azores
- In office 6 January 1975 – 29 August 1976

Governor of Uíge District
- In office 1972–1974

Personal details
- Born: Altino Amadeu Pinto de Magalhães; 8 May 1922 Ribalonga, Carrazeda de Ansiães, Portugal
- Died: 24 January 2019 (aged 96) Oeiras, Portugal
- Party: Independent
- Education: Portuguese Military Academy
- Profession: Army officer

Military service
- Allegiance: Portugal
- Branch/service: Portuguese Army
- Rank: General

Altino Amadeu Pinto de Magalhães Portuguese pronunciation: [alˈtinu ɐmɐˈðɛw ˈpĩtu ðɨ mɐɣɐˈʎɐ̃jʃ]; 8 May 1922 – 24 January 2019) was a Portuguese commissioned army officer in the Portuguese Armed Forces and politician who served as a deputy Minister of Defence. He was the President of the Junta Regional of the Azores. He served as a general in the Portuguese Armed Forces, who, while having a conservative style, supported the Carnation Revolution of 25 April 1974.

== Career ==
During his time at the Army Academy, Altino studied Infantry, Transmission and Information, the general and complementary courses in Officers training, as well as taking an aviation course to provide tourist services.

He was promoted to ensign in March 1943 while in Lamego, and served with the 9th Regimental Infantry in São Miguel and Terceira. He served in Portuguese Angola between 1946 and 1948, where he was promoted to lieutenant before serving in Braga. Before returning to Angola, where he served between 1949 and 1953, he was made promoted to captain in December 1948. He served in the Ministry of the Army between 1953 and 1961, becoming a major by December 1957 and later lieutenant-colonel by May 1961, before being transferred to Madeira (Funchal). He returned to the Ministry between 1963 and 1969, being invested as colonel in 1968. He joined the Quartel General da Região Militar (Military Regional General Garrison) in Angola in 1969–71, serving in the Estado Maior do Exército (Army Staff) and regional command, advancing to the position of Brigadier by August 1973.

=== Presidency of the Azores ===
Pinto de Magalhães was nominated to the position of Military Governor and Commander-in-Chief of the Armed Forces in the Azores on 6 January 1975 (a function that he served until 29 August 1976).

He arrived in Ponta Delgada during a period of heightened tensions after the Revolution, during a political crisis and ideological conflict between anti-communists and separatists. On 6 June 1975 a protest in Ponta Delgada was held, in direct and conscious defiance of a law prohibiting such political gatherings. Quickly the protest turned into a separatist manifestation. The military tried to block protesters from descending on the Conceição Palace, which at the time was the residence of the Civil Governor (António Borges Coutinho). Magalhães met with Coutinho, but in the middle of the confusion, Coutinho abruptly resigned. The news of this event provoked a wave of cheers from the protesters and demands for the Azores' complete independence. What followed were negotiations between the commander-in-chief and a group of protesters. After the protesters had calmed-down, orders were sent to arrest some of the personalities considered responsible for the subversive acts related to the agitation, and they were deported to Terceira.

As a consequence of these events, a Junta Governativa Regional (Governing Regional Junta) was established under decree-law 458/B/75 on 22 August 1975. The Junta was presided over by the military Commandant, allied to a civilian council that included representatives of the leading non-communist political parties (Social Democrats, Socialists and Democratic-Centrists). It operated as a provisional government of the Azores, until the new Portuguese Constitution established the Regional Government of the Azores.

Between 26 August 1975 and 29 August 1976 Magalhães served as the president of the Junta Regional dos Açores (Azores Regional Junta). Prior to his abandoning the position of president, in February 1976, he was promoted to General.

== Later life ==
During his career Magalhães held the highest level roles in his military postings, attaining many of the functions in the military hierarchy. Similarly, he exercise civilian functions: District Governor of Uige (1972–74); Representative of the Governing Junta in Angola (1974) and as President of the Regional Junta of the Azores (1975–76). Between 1976 and 1979 he served in the Army's Planning Directorate, and later the Armed Forces Planning Directorate (1979–1984), attaining the post of four-star General by July 1979.

He was the President of the Central Committee of the Combatants League (Portuguese: Presidente da Direcção Central da Liga dos Combatentes) between 1986 and 1996. His military career included fifteen command-level accreditation, as well as in Governing and Ministerial postings. In addition, he received eight national medallions, in addition to commendations and honours from Brazil (six), France (one) and Yugoslavia (one). His national honors included three (silver and gold) Service Distinctions with Palm and a Grand Cross in the Military Order.

He became President of the Executive Commission established to by the National Association of Overseas Combatants (Portuguese: Associação Nacional dos Combatentes do Ultramar) to guide the building of national monument to overseas troops in 1986. He held this position until about 1996.

In 1985, he became a candidate for the Presidency of Portugal.

Magalhães died on 24 January 2019 of natural causes. His body lay at the São João de Deus church in Lisbon prior to his funeral on 26 January.
