= Ponta Delgada District =

Ponta Delgada Distrito Autónomo de Ponta Delgada
- District
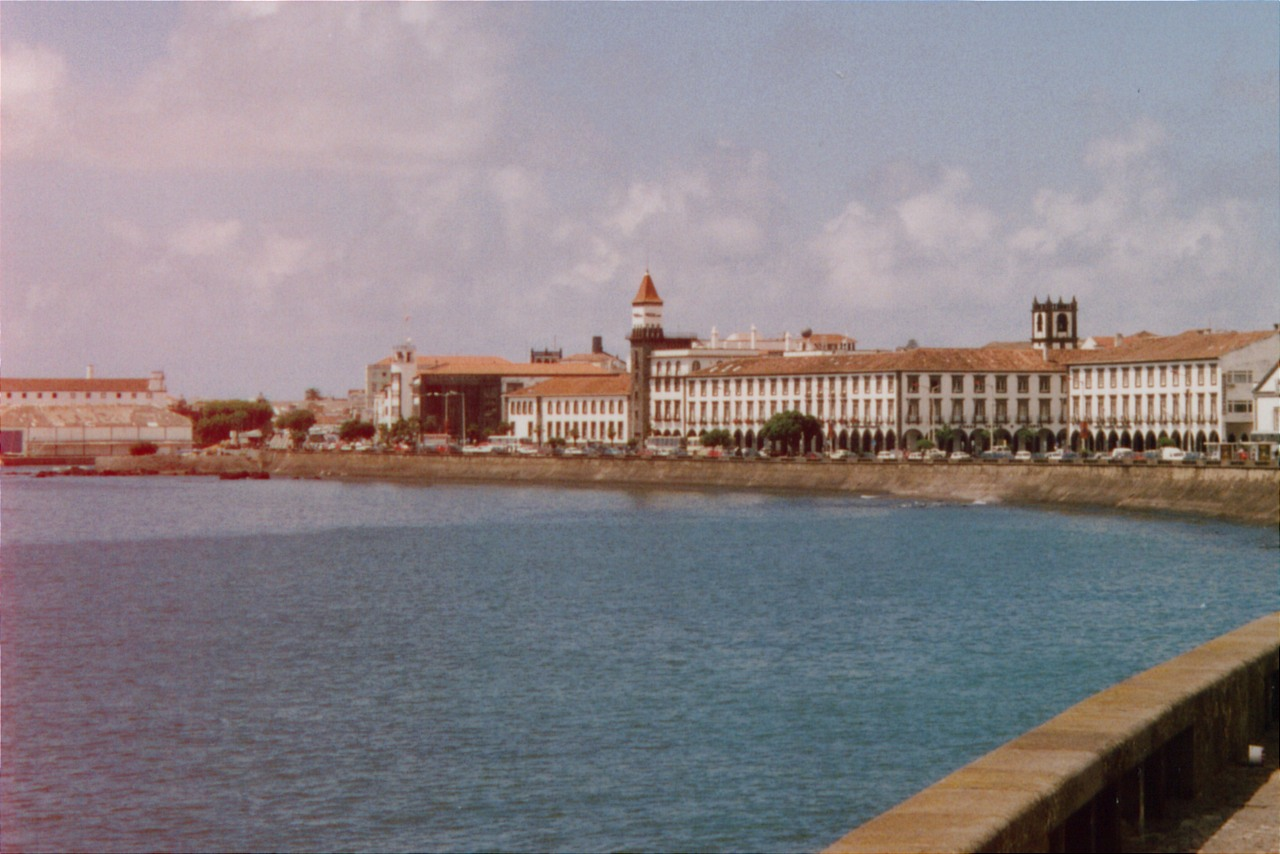
- The district capital of Ponta Delgada, located on the island of São Miguel
- Interactive map of Ponta Delgada
- Country: Portugal
- Province: Ilhas Adjacentes
- Region: Azores
- Established: 1835
- Extinguished: 22 August 1975
- Municipalities: Lagoa, Ponta Delgada, Povoação, Nordeste, Ribeira Grande, Vila Franca do Campo, Vila do Porto

Government
  - Type: Autonomous District
  - Body: District Administration
  - Mayor: António Borges Coutinho

Area
  - Total: 800 km^{2} (310 sq mi)
- Time zone: UTC-1 (Azores)
  - Summer (DST): UTC0 (Azores)

The District of Ponta Delgada was a district of the Ilhas Adjacentes (the former collective name for the Azores and Madeira), consisting of the dependent eastern islands of the Azores, located in the Atlantic Ocean. The district of Ponta Delgada, not to be confused with the modern municipality of Ponta Delgada, existed from 1835 until 1976 when it was abolished in the favour of the autonomy charter of the 1975 Portuguese Constitution.

== History ==
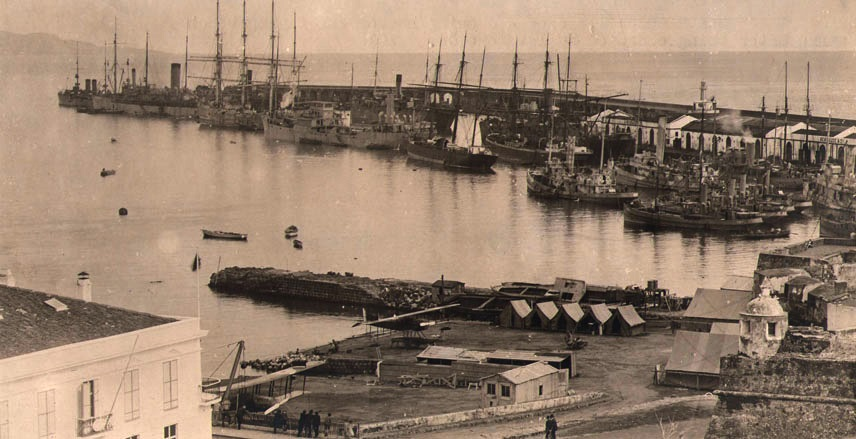
The district capital of Ponta Delgada at the end of the First World War

By decree, on 18 July 1835, Mouzinho da Silveira established the districts of the Ilhas Adjacentes as part of his administrative reforms of local government. The provinces were extinguished, and the administrative and fiscal districts were created that included the eastern and western groups of islands: centred on Angra do Heroísmo and Ponta Delgada. This was followed in 1833 by an independence movement by the recently promoted centre of Horta, forcing by 28 March 1836 division the Azorean territory into three districts. During this process Ponta Delgada did not change, and remained defined by the two eastern islands and islets of the Formigas.

During the Estado Novo regime of António de Oliveira Salazar the region obtained autonomy as a district, especially after 1940.

Following the Hot Summer of 1975, a protest in the centre of Ponta Delgada, comprising property-owners and farmers challenged the government of António Borges Coutinho, who was charged with implementing land reforms after the Carnation Revolution. The Micalense Farmers' Protest, forced his resignation, and inspired a series of terrorist acts that plunged the Azores into political turmoil. After a round-up of arrests and detentions by the Military Governor, the Autonomous District of Ponta Delgada was extinguished, along with the other districts (Horta and Angra do Heroísmo) on 22 August 1975, with the establishment of theJunta Regional dos Açores (Regional Junta of the Azores), the provisional government that assumed the competencies of the administration during the region's transition to constitutional autonomy.

With regional autonomy, the districts were completely abolished: the 1976 Portuguese constitution defined in law the status of Autonomous Region without the existence of districts. Local government authority and administration fell to the upper-level Local Administrative Units(the municipalities) and second-tier LAU IIs (the civil parishes).

== Geography ==
The district covered about 800 km^{2} and included the two islands of Santa Maria and São Miguel and the small islets of the Formigas. It included the seven municipalities of:

- Lagoa
- Nordeste
- Ponta Delgada (former capital)
- Povoação
- Ribeira Grande
- Vila Franca do Campo
- Vila do Porto
