= Horta District =

Horta Distrito Autónomo da Horta
- District
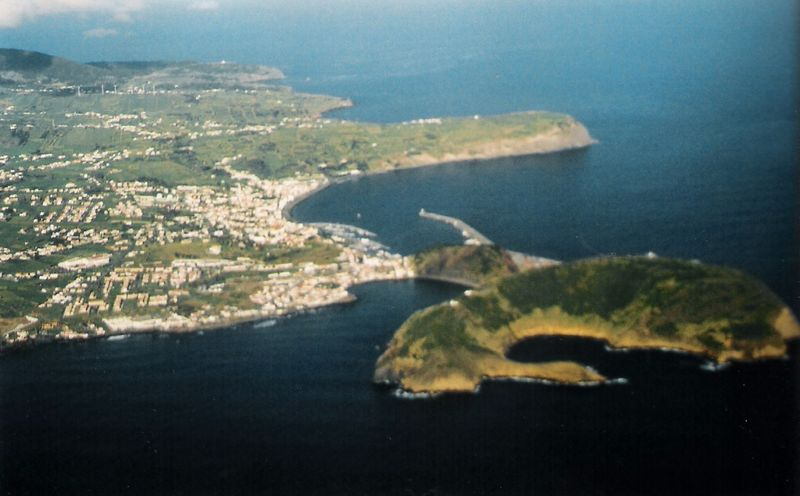
- The district capital of Horta, which includes the parishes of Conceição, Matriz and Angústias
- Interactive map of Horta
- Country: Portugal
- Province: Ilhas Adjacentes
- Region: Azores
- Established: 28 March 1836
- Extinguished: 22 August 1975
- Municipalities: Vila do Corvo, Horta, Lajes das Flores, Lajes do Pico, Madalena, São Roque do Pico

Government
  - Type: Autonomous district
  - Body: District administration
  - Mayor: Rui Vasco de Vasconcelos e Sá Vaz

Area
  - Total: 776.17 km^{2} (299.68 sq mi)
- Time zone: UTC-1 (Azores)
  - Summer (DST): UTC0 (Azores)

The District of Horta was a district of the Ilhas Adjacentes (Adjacent Islands, the former collective name for the Azores and Madeira), consisting of the dependent western islands of the Azores, located in the Atlantic Ocean. The district of Horta, not to be confused with the modern municipality of Horta, existed from 1836 until 1976 when it was abolished in favour of the autonomy charter of the 1975 Portuguese Constitution.

== History ==
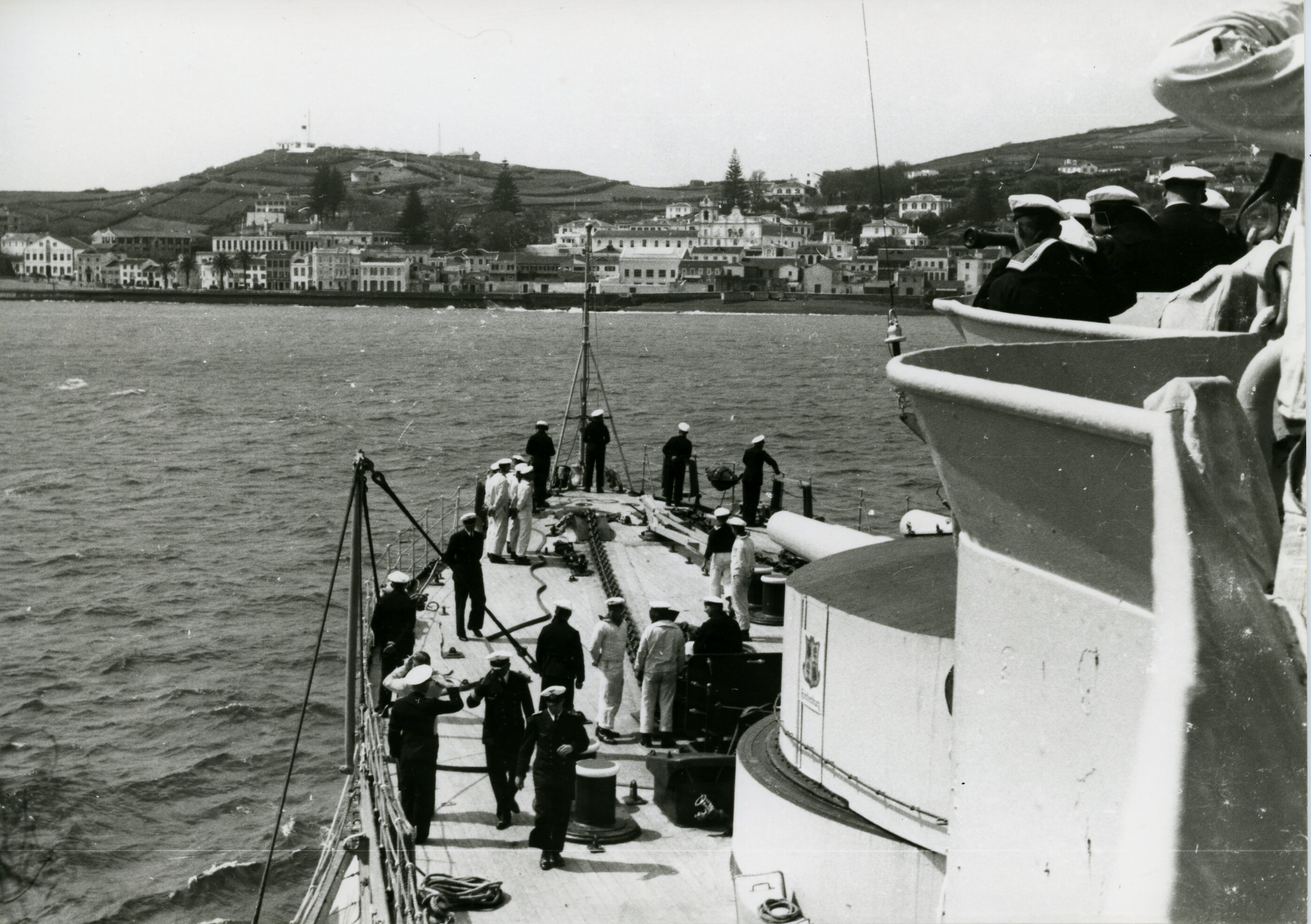
View of the district seat of Horta from the World War II era warship SMS Schlesien

Officially referred to as the Distrito Autónomo da Horta (Autonomous District of Horta) since 31 December 1940, it was originally established after the Liberal administrative reforms of Mouzinhos da Silveira on 28 March 1836. During these reforms the Azores were redesignated dependencies of Portugal as the constitutionally-designated Ilhas Adjacentes (Adjacent Islands). The district's creation resulted from the division of the Província Ocidental dos Açores (Western Province of the Azores), its seat in the district capital of Angra do Heroísmo, into two areas with the latter's seat in Horta.

District autonomy was established during the Estado Novo regime of António de Oliveira Salazar in 1940.

The Autonomous District of Horta was extinguished, along with the Districts of Ponta Delgada and Angra do Heroísmo on 22 August 1975, with the establishment of the Junta Regional dos Açores (Regional Junta of the Azores), the provisional government that assumed the competencies of the administration during the region's transition to constitutional autonomy. With regional autonomy the districts were completely abolished: the 1976 Portuguese constitution defined in law the status of Autonomous Region without the existence of districts. Local government authority and administration fell to the upper-level local administrative units (the municipalities) and second-tier LAU IIs (the civil parishes (freguesias)).

== Geography ==
The district of Horta included the western and the southern central islands of the Azores: Corvo, Flores, Faial and Pico. This region includes a land area of 776.17 km^{2} of islands and islets, and the following municipalities:

- Corvo
- Horta
- Lajes das Flores
- Lajes do Pico
- Madalena
- Santa Cruz das Flores
- São Roque do Pico
