= Angra do Heroísmo District =

Angra do Heroísmo Distrito Autónomo de Angra do Heroísmo
- District
- Country: Portugal
- Province: Ilhas Adjacentes
- Region: Azores
- Established: 28 March 1836
- Extinguished: 22 August 1975

Government
  - Type: Autonomous district
  - Body: District administration

Area
  - Total: 239.00 km^{2} (92.28 sq mi)
- Time zone: UTC-1 (Azores)
  - Summer (DST): UTC0 (Azores)

The District of Angra do Heroísmo (after 6 October 1898 the Autonomous District of Angra do Heroísmo), was a district of the Ilhas Adjacentes (the former collective name for the Azores and Madeira), consisting of the dependent central islands of the Azores. The district of Angra, not to be confused with the modern municipality of Angra do Heroísmo, existed until 1976 when it was abolished in the favor of the autonomy charter of the 1976 Portuguese Constitution.

== History ==
It was created in 1835, with its seat in the city of Angra do Heroísmo, and included the islands of Terceira, São Jorge and Graciosa. Like its counterparts in Horta and Ponta Delgada, it was extinguished on 22 August 1975, with the creation of the Junta Regional of the Azores (which superseded the competencies of those institutions).

With constitutional autonomy of the Azores, the districts were definitively extinguished. The constitution of the Portuguese Republic of 1976 installed a politico-administrative statute that invested power in a regional government.

== Geography ==
The district of Angra do Heroísmo included the northern central islands of the Azores: Graciosa, Terceira and São Jorge. This region includes a land area of 239 km^{2}, and the following municipalities:

- Santa Cruz da Graciosa
- Angra do Heroísmo
- Praia da Vitória
- Calheta
- Velas
