= Fernando de Quintanilha e Mendonça Dias =

Portuguese Navy admiral & colonial governor (1898-1992)

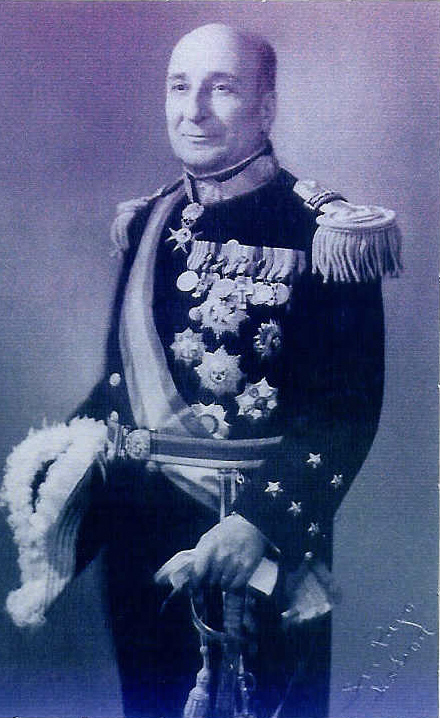
- Portrait of Vice Admiral Fernando de Quintanilha e Mendonça Dias

Governor of the Portuguese India
- In office 1948–1952
- Preceded by: José Alves Ferreira
- Succeeded by: Paulo Bénard Guedes

Navy Minister
- Incumbent
- Assumed office 1958 to 1968
- Preceded by: Américo Tomás
- Succeeded by: Manuel Pereira Crespo

Personal details
- Born: 15 November 1898 Chaves, Portugal
- Died: 9 June 1992 (aged 93) Lisbon, Portugal
- Resting place: Cemitério do Alto de São João

Military service
- Allegiance: Portugal
- Branch/service: Portuguese Navy
- Rank: Vice admiral

Fernando de Quintanilha e Mendonça Dias (Chaves, 15 November 1898 - Lisbon, São Vicente de Fora, 9 June 1992) was an officer of the Portuguese Navy, and a political and colonial administrator during the Estado Novo and Minister of the Navy from 1958 to 1968. In this role he was instrumental in the creation of the Hydrographic Institute.

In 1947, following the independence of India, he played an important role in the defense of Goa against the economic blockade that was imposed by leaders of neighboring Indian states. He was also general-governor of the Portuguese State of India (Estado da Índia) from 1948 to 1952.

== Biography ==
=== Family ===
Born in Chaves, Portugal in the parish of Santa Maria Maior, on 15 November 1898, he died in Lisbon, in São Vicente de Fora parish, on 6 September 1992, and was buried in the Field of Combatants (Talhão dos Combatentes) in the Cemitério do Alto de São João.

He was the son of Jose Antonio Dias, a businessman and landlord in Chaves, and his wife Ermelinda Júlia Lopes da Silva de Quintanilha e Mendonça, daughter of Pascal Lino Quintanilha e Mendonça, finance inspector, and his wife Joan Valézia Lopes da Silva; and paternal granddaughter of Francisco José de Quintanilha e Mendonça, administrator of the former municipalities of Alhambra, Alverca do Ribatejo, and Moita, and his wife Maria José Adelaide Moura.

He married twice, first in Chaves on 3 July 1923, to Irene da Encarnação de Morais Pereira, the daughter of José Afonso Pereira, an infantry major in charge of the government of the Congo in 1917, and governor of Mexico in 1919 among other positions, and his wife Carmelina da Glória de Morais.

His second marriage took place in Lisbon on 12 March 1932, to the sister of his first wife, Carmelina da Glória de Morais Pereira.

Two of his daughters married in Goa, in the chapel of the Palácio do Cabo (the governor's residence), during his tenure. Irene Maria, daughter from his first marriage, in March 1950 married Fernando Simões Coelho da Fonseca (1926-2006), later vice-admiral and president of the Geographical Society of Lisbon in 1975-1978. Fernanda Maria, a daughter from his second marriage, married in March 1951, to Joaquim Arrais do Lago Torres de Magalhães (1922- ), later brigadier general and commander of the Artillery School in 1974.

He was a relative of Capitão-de-Mar-e-Guerra Veríssimo José de Quintanilha e Mendonça (1843-1917), knight of the Royal Household, the fifth and final Lord of Morgadio do Sardoal, senior official of the Navy Ministry and founding partner of the Portuguese Naval Military Club, and younger brother of Raimundo José de Quintanilha e Mendonça (1850-1935), General of the Division and Director of Public Works in India, Macau and Timor.

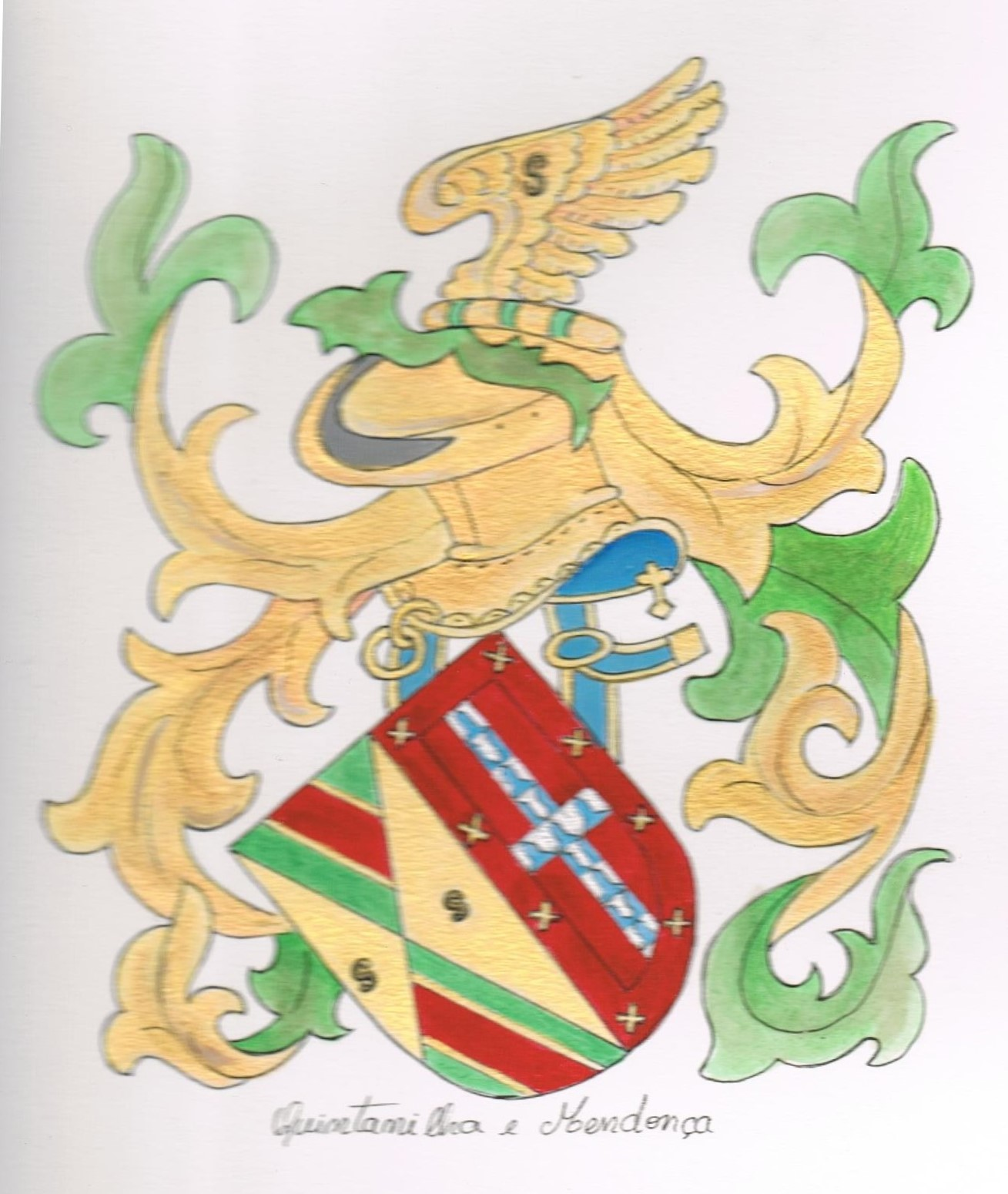
The coat of arms belonging to Veríssimo José de Quintanilha e Mendonça, designed and painted by Carlota Menezes

== Professional career ==
Quintanilha e Mendonça Dias enlisted in 1916. He was promoted to second lieutenant (segundo-tenente) in 1920, first lieutenant (primeiro-tenente) in 1924, captain-lieutenant (capitão-tenente) in 1935, lieutenant commander (capitão-de-fragata) in 1940, the captain of sea and war (capitão-de-mar-e-guerra) in 1946 and commodore in 1953. He was promoted to rear admiral (equivalent to the current rank of vice admiral, which was only introduced in 1977) in 1958.

In 1921 he embarked as the ship's chief of the Portuguese Navy battleship Vasco da Gama. In 1922 he was in charge of the navigation cruiser NRP República (of the Carvalho Araújo class) during the first air crossing of the South Atlantic by Gago Coutinho and Sacadura Cabral from Lisbon to Rio de Janeiro. He was commander of the NRP Pedro Nunes in 1941, and NRP Bartolomeu Dias in 1952, having among other missions represented the Portuguese Navy in the ceremonies of the coronation of Queen Elizabeth II of the United Kingdom in June 1953.

He was also the deputy chief of navy staff in the years 1953-1955 and deputy chief of the armed forces general staff in 1957-1958. Between 1954 and 1958 he also taught at the Naval School of War.

== Political and administrative Career ==
Quintanilha e Mendonça Dias was appointed captain of the port of Chinde, Mozambique, and was also responsible for the hydrographic survey of its sandbar and harbour. From 1925 he was intendant of the government of Chinde, having also acted as captain of Cabo Delgado Province and port of Quelimane (1935). He was also governor of Niassa Province in 1935, and in charge of the Zambezia government in 1937.

In 1940, he was chief of staff of the Naval Force exercises and the Naval Force of the Metropolis; in 1941-1943 he was involved in the maritime defense of Lisbon, and acting deputy chief of staff and liaison officer with the Ministry of War.

=== Governor of Portuguese India ===
Later, in Portuguese India, Quintanilha e Mendonça Dias was chief of India's State Marine Services in 1944, as well as chairman of the Board of Directors of Autonomous Portuguese India Navigation Services. He was a member of the state government of the Council of India, then vice-president of this Council in 1946.

On 15 August 1947 British India became independent, which made it difficult to predict the future of the (Portuguese) Estado da Índia. Three days earlier, Quintanilha e Mendonça Dias was placed in charge of the government of Portuguese India in an interim regime, a position that he would occupy until the end of June of the following year.

The office of governor-general was first offered to Gabriel Teixeira, then governor-general of Mozambique, a man with extensive experience in the East, having been governor of Macau from 1940 to 1946. When Teixeira declined the offer, Quintanilha e Mendonça Dias, "[...] an official with colonial experience, able, hardworking, resourceful and skillfully [...]" in the words of the minister of colonies to António de Oliveira Salazar, was appointed governor-general of the State of India in 1948.

Also in 1947, following the independence of India, the acting governor had an important role to play in the defense of Goa against the economic blockade imposed by leaders of neighboring Indian states. The role he played in his attempts to overcome the nationalist movement in Goa has been debated; some claim that he only reaped the benefits of the efforts of the previous governor-general.

Soon after its independence, India wanted to start negotiations with Portugal on the fate of the Portuguese Estado da Índia. One of the most contentious issues was the old right of the Padroado Português — which allowed the Portuguese to appoint bishops to suffragan dioceses in what was now independent India. In 1948, the English prelate of Bombay insisted on resigning. Under the 1928 agreement between Britain, Portugal and the Holy See, this post had alternating between a Portuguese prelate and an English one. Hence, a Portuguese prelate should have been appointed — something that already independent India was unwilling to tolerate. The Padroado crisis that followed, from 1948-1953, went along with the government of Quintanilha e Mendonça Dias. As a result, the governor-general officially excluded Archbishop Patriarch José da Costa Nunes, Patriarch of the Indies — who had celebrated the weddings of both his daughters in 1950 and 1951—from the Council of the State of India (Conselho do Governo do Estado da Índia), because India accused the Portuguese Padroado of being a political instrument of the regime in Lisbon. The protests of the Patriarch of the Indies to António de Oliveira Salazar over this maneuver proved fruitless.

While he was governor-general, he got involved in the transfer of large sums of money through the Reserve Bank of India which caused a scandal because of his close links to wealthy businessmen. He also became infamous after being physically attacked in the Governor’s palace by Goan lawyer Bruta da Costa from Margao, when he was caught eavesdropping on a conversation between da Costa and Manuel Maria Sarmento Rodrigues in 1952.

Governor General Quintanilha e Mendonça Dias had a difficult relationship with infantry major Carlos Alves Roçadas, then chief of the armed forces of the Estado da Índia. The solution, found by the Minister of Colonies in 1950, was to appoint Alves Roçadas as governor of Cape Verde, another Portuguese-ruled territory.

While in India, the then captain-of-sea-and-war (capitão-de-mar-e-guerra) collated a collection of over three hundred old books on Portuguese India and the Portuguese in the East. This collection was acquired after his death by the University of Chicago Library and is now a part of the Southern Asian Collection of the Regenstein Library.

=== Navy Minister ===
Back to the metropolis, the captain-of-sea-and-war (capitão-de-mar-e-guerra) Quintanilha e Mendonça Dias was the attorney of the Corporate Board by appointment of the Corporate Council and Advisory Council of the Presidency between 1953 and 1958. During that period he was also professor at the Higher Naval Institute of War and acting director of the Institute.

In 1958, Admiral Américo Tomás, Minister of the Navy since 1944, was the candidate of the União Nacional to replace General Craveiro Lopes as presidential candidate in the elections of that year, against General Humberto Delgado. One of the candidates to succeed Tomás in the Navy was Henrique Tenreiro, the "Fisheries Boss", who had long insisted on the creation of a Ministry or Secretary of State for Fisheries. However Salazar preferred "[...] a man whose political profile walked close to the Tenreiro, while less controversial and most prestigious within the Navy, considering the merits of his naval career and important places that occupied the colonial administration [...] ". Fernando Quintanilha e Mendonça Dias was thus named minister of the navy in 1958.

As Minister of the Navy, he supported the Estado Novo regime during the "Abrilada de 1961" or Botelho Moniz coup.

That same year, 1961, saw the beginning of overseas conflicts. According to NATO's naval strategy, of which Portugal was a founding member in 1949, the role of the Portuguese Navy in the 1950s was essentially to contain the submarine threat of the Soviet Union in the North Atlantic. With the outbreak of conflicts overseas, the Navy's attention turned from the "blue waters" of the Atlantic to the "brown waters" of the African coast. The war, and the coastal geography and climate of Africa, demanded other types of vessels and equipment, compared to those which the navy had at the time.

To meet the new requirements, Admiral Quintanilha e Mendonça Dias embarked on an ambitious program to modernize the Portuguese Navy. The French ambassador in Lisbon, Bernard de Menthon, reported to the Quai d'Orsay that the minister of the navy "[...] sought to see the president of the Council of the need to start the restructuring program as soon as possible [.. .]." In the years 1961-1974 the Portuguese Navy saw the old ships of World War II replaced by 65 new units, including among other classes: monitoring boats (Class Bellatrix and Class Argos (1963)), patrol vessels (class Cacine), corvettes (John Coutinho class), frigates (João Belo class and class Admiral Pereira da Silva), and four new submarines (Albacora class).

Most of these ships were built in foreign shipyards. Only the lack of capacity and urgent need for delivery meant that some vessels had to be built in foreign shipyards, particularly in Spain, France and Germany. In the ten years in which Quintanilha e Mendonça Dias occupied the Navy portfolio, France and Germany, replaced Portugal's traditional ally -England— as political allies and arms suppliers. Of all the new ships, the João Coutinho-class corvette, designed by naval engineer and Rear Admiral Roger d'Oliveira, gained international recognition thanks to the quality of the project.

Fernando de Quintanilha e Mendonça Dias also played a decisive role in creating the Hydrographic Institute in 1960. He was minister of the Navy until 1968. In the exercise of this office, he was one of the signators of the new Portuguese Civil Code of 1966.

He was also the acting minister of Overseas in 1959, and member of the Empire Bar Council until 1969.

== Main office held ==
Ministro da Marinha (15 August 1958 – 19 August 1968). (Navy Minister)

Governador-Geral of the Estado Português da Índia (23 December 1948 – 11 October 1952). Governor General

Subchefe do Estado-Maior daArmada (12 July 1957 – 14 August 1958) e Subchefe do Estado-Maior Naval (8 July 1953 – 22 November 1955). Deputy Chief of the General Staff of the Navy

Director Interino do Instituto Superior Naval de Guerra (27 July 1954 – 13 July 1955). Acting Director of Naval Institute of War

Professor do Curso Superior do Instituto Superior Naval de Guerra (1954-1958). Professor.

Procurador à Câmara Corporativa (VI e VII Legislaturas)(1953-1958) e Assessor do Conselho da Presidência. Attorney to Corporate Board (VI and VII Legislatures) (from 1953 to 1958) and Advisor to the Council of Presidency.

== Decorations ==
Among others, Vice Admiral ernando de Quintanilha e Mendonça Dias was awarded the following decorations and Portuguese Orders:

- Oficial da Ordem Militar de Avis de Portugal (21 December 1929)
- Comendador da Ordem Militar de Avis de Portugal (28 August 1941)
- Grande-Oficial da Ordem Militar de Avis de Portugal (22 March 1943)
- Grande-Oficial da Ordem do Império de Portugal (15 April 1952)
- Grã-Cruz da Ordem do Infante D. Henrique de Portugal (3 January 1961)
- Grã-Cruz da Ordem Militar de Cristo de Portugal (2 September 1961)
- Grã-Cruz da Ordem Militar de Avis de Portugal (16 September 1968)

Honours from overseas:

- Queen Elizabeth II Coronation Medal (24 June 1953)
- Medalha de Mérito Naval de Serviços Distintos do Brasil (7 September 1957)

His name was given to two streets in Chinde, and a residential district in Daman, which are respectively known as Comandante Quintanilha, Almirante Quintanilha Dias and Comandante Quintanilha. He was named an honorary citizen of the municipality of Goa, the village Chinde, and the city of New Orleans, USA, and an honorary member and his name was given to a room in the Institute Vasco da Gama. He was a member of honor of the Instituto de Estudos e Investigações de Ávila, and "Gran Duque de Alba" (Institute for Studies and Investigations) and was awarded the Gold Medal of Tavira.
