= Américo Tomás =

President of Portugal from 1958 to 1974

His Excellency Admiral Américo Tomás OSE ComA GOA ComC GCC GCoITE
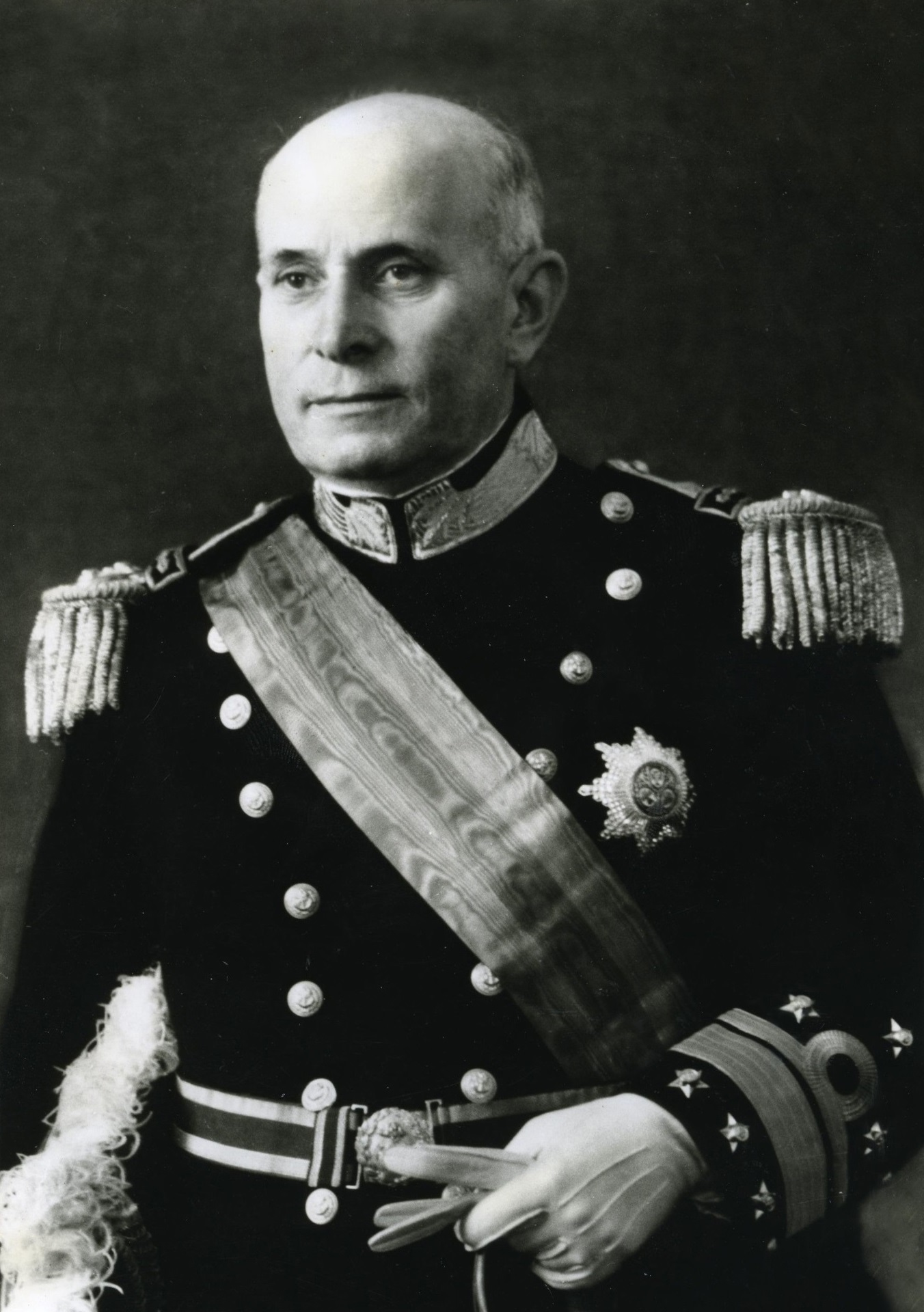
- Official portrait, 1958-1960

President of Portugal
- In office 9 August 1958 – 25 April 1974
- Prime Minister: António de Oliveira Salazar; Marcelo Caetano
- Preceded by: Francisco Craveiro Lopes
- Succeeded by: António de Spínola

Minister of the Navy
- In office 6 September 1944 – 10 May 1958
- President: Óscar Carmona; Himself
- Prime Minister: António de Oliveira Salazar
- Preceded by: Manuel Ortins de Bettencourt
- Succeeded by: Fernando de Quintanilha e Mendonça Dias

Minister of Defence
- Acting; 22 May 1957 – 29 June 1957
- President: Francisco Craveiro Lopes
- Prime Minister: António de Oliveira Salazar
- Preceded by: Fernando dos Santos Costa
- Succeeded by: Fernando dos Santos Costa

Minister of the Colonies
- Acting; 9 June 1945 – 14 November 1945
- President: Óscar Carmona
- Prime Minister: António de Oliveira Salazar
- Preceded by: Marcello Caetano
- Succeeded by: Marcello Caetano

Personal details
- Born: Américo de Deus Rodrigues Tomás; 19 November 1894 Lisbon, Kingdom of Portugal
- Died: 18 September 1987 (aged 92) Cascais, Portugal
- Party: National Union
- Spouse: Gertrudes Ribeiro da Costa
- Children: 2
- Education: Portuguese Naval School
- Profession: Naval officer
- Awards: Order of St. James of the Sword; Order of Aviz; Order of Christ; Order of the Tower and Sword

Military service
- Allegiance: Portugal
- Branch/service: Portuguese Navy
- Years of service: 1914–1974
- Rank: Admiral
- Battles/wars: First World War; Portuguese Colonial War

Américo de Deus Rodrigues Tomás (Note: Portuguese pronunciation: [ɐˈmɛɾiku ðɨ ˈðewʒ ʁuˈðɾiɣɨʃ tuˈmaʃ]) OSE ComA GOA ComC GCC GCoITE (19 November 1894 – 18 September 1987) was a Portuguese Navy officer and politician who served as the president of Portugal from 1958 to 1974. He was the last president of the authoritarian and corporatist Estado Novo.

== Biography ==
=== Early life ===
Américo de Deus Rodrigues Tomás (also Thomaz) was born in Lisbon to his parents António Rodrigues Tomás and Maria da Assumpção Marques. He married Gertrudes Ribeiro da Costa in October 1922. The couple had two children, Maria Natália Rodrigues Tomás (born 1923) and Maria Magdalena Rodrigues Tomás (born 1925). Tomás entered high school at Lapa, Portugal in 1904, completing his secondary education in 1911. He then attended the Faculty of Sciences for two years (1912–1914), after which he joined the Naval Academy as a midshipman.

=== Military career ===
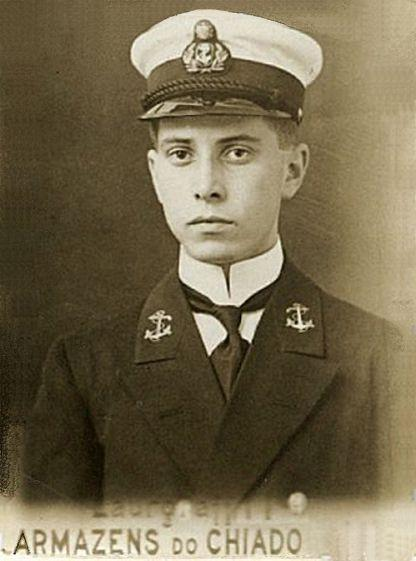
Américo Tomás as a Navy Cadet, in 1915.

After Tomás graduated from the Naval Academy in 1916, he was assigned to the Portuguese coast escort service on Vasco da Gama and later assigned to the Pedro Nunes and the destroyers Douro and Tejo during World War I. In 1918, he received a promotion to Lieutenant.

On 17 March 1920, he was placed on the survey vessel 5 de Outubro, where he served for the next sixteen years. During this time, he was assigned to the survey mission of the Portuguese coast and was a board member of the Technical Commission for Hydrography, Navigation and Nautical Meteorology and a member of the Council for Studies of Oceanography and Fisheries. Tomás was also a member of the International Permanent Council for the Exploration of the Sea.

Tomás was appointed chief of staff to the Minister of the Navy in 1936, President of the Merchant Marine National Junta from 1940 to 1944, and Minister of the Navy from 1944 to 1958.

During his term as Minister of the Navy, he was responsible for the total reconstruction of the Portuguese commercial navy organized under Dispatch 100. Fifty-six ships were ordered, with a total of more than 300,000 tons of displacement. The dispatch included statutes that also allowed the formation of what is now the modern shipbuilding industry in Portugal. Tomás' actions while serving as Minister of the Navy won him a positive reputation in the marine community, unlike the infamy acquired by several of his colleagues in the Portuguese Armed Forces (FAP) and the government of Portugal during their respective tenures.

=== Presidency ===
In 1958, Tomás was chosen by then-Prime Minister António Salazar as the candidate of the ruling National Union party for the presidency of the republic, succeeding Francisco Craveiro Lopes. He ran against the opposition-backed Humberto Delgado. It initially appeared that the election ended as soon as Tomás was nominated. The electoral system was so heavily rigged in favor of the National Union that he could not possibly be defeated. However, in an unusually spirited contest, Tomás was ultimately credited with 76.4 percent of the vote to Delgado's 23.5 percent. Most neutral observers believed, however, that Delgado would have won had Salazar allowed an honest election. Salazar was alarmed enough that he pushed through a constitutional amendment transferring the election of the president to the legislature, which was firmly controlled by the regime. As a result, Delgado was the only opposition candidate in the history of the Second Republic (including its first incarnation as the Ditadura Nacional) to stay in the race until Election Day. Tomás was re-elected twtice by the legislature, in 1965 and 1972, as the only candidate.

Although vested with sweeping constitutional powers, Tomás functioned largely as little a figurehead during his first decade in office, while Salazar, as prime minister held the real power for most of the Estado Novo's existence Salazar had reportedly selected Tomás as a successor to Craveiro Lopes because the latter had displayed an independent streak that Salazar found undesirable. Tomás' limited authority relegated him largely to ceremonial role at inaugurations and public events, a position reinforced by his limited skill as a public speaker, which made him a frequent subject of jokes.

In September 1968, Salazar was incapacitated by a coma. Believing that Salazar did not have long to live, Tomás dismissed Salazar and appointed Marcelo Caetano to succeed him, ending Salazar's 36 years of authoritarian rule. For all intents and purposes, the president's power to dismiss the prime minister had been the only check on Salazar's power. However, he never informed the recovered Salazar that he had been removed as leader of the regime he had largely created. Reportedly, when Salazar died two years later, he still believed that he was prime minister.

Tomás' ouster of Salazar would be the only time he exercised his presidential prerogatives during his first decade in office. In contrast, Tomás took a much more active role in the government after Caetano took power. While he had given Salazar more or less a free hand, he was not willing to do the same for Caetano. Eventually, Tomás became the rallying point for hardliners who opposed Caetano's efforts to open up the regime. Caetano's reforms did not go nearly far enough for a populace that had no memory of the instability and chaos that had preceded Salazar. For instance, he left the presidential election in the hands of the regime-dominated legislature, which re-elected Tomás unopposed in 1972. However, Caetano had to expend nearly all of his political capital to wrangle even these meagre reforms out of Tomás and the hardliners. He was thus in no position to resist when Tomás and the other hardliners forced the end of the reform experiment a year later.

Tomás, unlike his predecessor, lived in his private residence while President of the Republic, using the Belém Palace only as an office and for official ceremonies.

=== Later life ===
On 25 April 1974, the Carnation Revolution ended 48 years of authoritarian rule in Portugal. After being removed from power, Tomás was exiled to Brazil; in 1978, President António Ramalho Eanes allowed his return to Portugal. In 1981, his eldest daughter, Natália, suddenly died. He was denied re-entry into the Navy and the extraordinary pension scheme currently in force for former presidents of the Republic, having received a modest pension from a retired military. After his return from exile, Tomás lived practically isolated, having gone through serious financial difficulties, being forced to sell various gifts and valuables from when he was president. He published his memoir in 1986.

Tomás died at his home, in Cascais, of a generalized infection, at the age of 92, on 18 September 1987. His funeral was simple and modest, without any representation or military or state honors, being buried in the Ajuda Cemetery.

== Honours ==
He was portrayed in the Angolan escudo banknote issues of 1962 and 1970.

=== National honours ===
- Grand Collar of the Order of the Tower and of the Sword, of the Valour, Loyalty and Merit (9 August 1963)
- Grand Cross of the Order of Christ (1 August 1953)
- Grand Officer of the Order of Aviz (10 August 1942)
- Commander of the Order of Christ (9 May 1934)
- Commander of the Order of Aviz (5 October 1932)
- Officer of the Order of Saint James of the Sword (5 October 1928)

=== Foreign honours ===
- Argentina:
  - Grand Cross of the Order of May (Naval Merit) (17 December 1954)
- Belgium:
  - Grand Cross of the Order of the Crown (15 October 1955)
- Brazil:
  - Grand Collar of the Order of the Southern Cross (28 August 1961)
  - Grand Cross of the Order of the Southern Cross (30 December 1953)
  - Grand Cross of the Order of Rio Branco (18 August 1972)
  - Grand Cross of the National Order of Merit (18 August 1972)
  - Grand Cross of the Order of Naval Merit (9 November 1953)
  - Cross of the Order of Sports Merit (12 September 1960)
  - Recipient of the Commemorative Medal of the Birth Centennial of Rui Barbosa (12 September 1960)
- Brazilian Imperial Family:
  - Grand Cross of the Order of Pedro I (1 September 1960)
- Ethiopian Empire:
  - Collar of the Order of the Queen of Sheba (17 June 1960)
- Holy See:
  - Knight of the Order of the Golden Spur (25 April 1966)
- Kingdom of Italy:
  - Officer of the Order of the Crown of Italy (21 June 1939)
- Monaco:
  - Grand Cross of the Order of Saint Charles (25 May 1964)
- Nicaragua:
  - Grand Collar of the Order of Ruben Dario (20 December 1966)
- Peru:
  - Grand Cross with Diamonds of the Order of the Sun (1 September 1960)
- Spain:
  - Grand Cross (White Decoration) of the Cross of Naval Merit (23 June 1930)
- Spain:
  - Knight of the Collar of the Order of Charles III (6 December 1961)
  - Knight Grand Cross of the Order of Isabella the Catholic (28 March 1955)
- Sovereign Military Order of Malta:
  - Bailiff Grand Cross of the Sovereign Military Order of Malta (10 October 1967)
- Thailand:
  - Knight Grand Commander of the Order of Rama (17 November 1966)
- United Kingdom:
  - Honorary Knight Grand Cross (Military division) of the Order of the Bath (4 February 1974)
- United States:
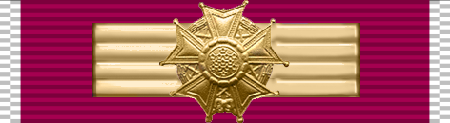
  - Chief Commander of the Legion of Merit (4 September 1954)

== Published works ==
- Sem Espírito Marítimo Não É Possível o Progresso da Marinha Mercante (in Portuguese), Lisbon, Portugal: self-published, 1956
- Renovação e Expansão da Frota Mercante Nacional, preface of Jerónimo Henriques Jorge (in Portuguese), Lisbon, Portugal: self-published, 1958
- Citações (in Portuguese), Lisbon, Portugal: República, 1975
- Últimas Décadas de Portugal (in Portuguese), vol. 4, Lisbon, Portugal: Fernando Pereira, 1981

== Notes ==
Political offices
Preceded by Francisco Craveiro Lopes	President of Portugal; 1958–1974	Succeeded by António de Spínola
Preceded by Fernando dos Santos Costa	Minister of the Navy (2nd time); 1953–1958	Succeeded by Fernando de Quintanilha e Mendonça Dias
Preceded by Fernando dos Santos Costa	Minister of Defence (Interim); 1957	Succeeded by Fernando dos Santos Costa
Preceded by Manuel Ortins de Bettencourt	Minister of the Navy (1st time); 1944–1953	Succeeded by Fernando dos Santos Costa
Preceded by Marcello Caetano	Minister of the Colonies (Interim); 1945	Succeeded by Marcello Caetano
