= Medalha Militar da Cruz de Guerra (Portugal) =

Portuguese military medal

Military Medal of the Cross of War Medalha Militar da Cruz de Guerra
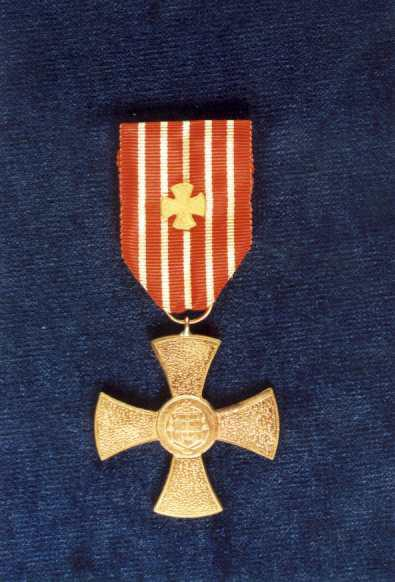

Awarded by President of the Portuguese Republic
- Type: Military Medal
- Established: 30 November 1916; 108 years ago
- Country: Portugal
- Ribbon
- Eligibility: Personnel of the Portuguese Military
- Criteria: Acts and feats of bravery performed on campaign
- Status: Active
- Grades: 1st Class (MPCG); 2nd Class (MSCG); 3rd Class (MTCG); 4th Class (MQCG)

Precedence
- Next (higher): Military Order of Christ
- Next (lower): Military Valor Medal

The Military Medal of the War Cross (Portuguese: Medalha Militar da Cruz de Guerra) was created by Decree No. 2870, of 30 November 1916, to award acts and feats of bravery performed in the campaign. This decoration received notoriety during World War I and during the Portuguese Colonial War . The Cruz de Guerra is the third highest Portuguese military decoration, ranking just after the Ordem Militar da Torre e Espada and the Medal of Military Valor, and being superior to the Orders of Christ, Avis and Sant'Iago da Espada e other military and civil decorations.

The Military Medal of the War Cross (Portuguese: Medalha Militar da Cruz de Guerra) was created by Decree No. 2870 on 30 November 1916 to reward acts and feats of bravery performed while on campaign. This decoration gained notoriety during the First World War and during the Portuguese Colonial War.

The War Cross is the third highest Portuguese military decoration, ranking just after the Military Order of the Tower and Sword and the Medal of Military Valor, and superior to the Military Order of Christ, Military Order of Aviz, and Military Order of Saint James of the Sword, as well as other military and civilian decorations.

== Grades ==
The Military Medal of the War Cross comprises the following grades, in descending order of preeminence:

- Military Medal of the War Cross (1^{st} Class) (MPCG) (Note: Portuguese: Medalha Militar da Cruz de Guerra – 1.ª Classe – In the center, a miniature war cross, surrounded by two branches of laurel, all in gold) (Portugal)
- Military Medal of the War Cross (2^{nd} Class) (MSCG) (Note: Portuguese: Medalha Militar da Cruz de Guerra – 2.ª Classe – In the center, a miniature war cross in gold) (Portugal)
- Military Medal of the War Cross (3^{rd} Class) (MTCG) (Note: Portuguese: Medalha Militar da Cruz de Guerra – 3.ª Classe – In the center, a miniature war cross in Silver) (Portugal)
- Military Medal of the War Cross (4^{th} Class) (MQCG) (Note: Portuguese: Medalha Militar da Cruz de Guerra – 4.ª Classe – In the center, a miniature war cross in Bronze) (Portugal)

The grade is awarded based on the deeds performed and not the rank of the awardee.

Unlike the Medal of Military Valor and the Medal of Distinguished Services (pt:Medalha de Serviços Distintos), the War Cross can only be awarded for deeds performed on campaign, without the need to distinguish those awards with a palm leaf.

== Insignia ==
The War Cross, slightly inspired by the French Croix de Guerre 1914-1918 (France) (mainly in the colors of the suspension ribbon), has had three different types or models throughout its history, respectively legislated in 1916, 1946, and 1971.

The design of this medal (since 1971) in its 1st Class is as follows:

- On the obverse or front, it is a templar cross in gold, with a National Emblem superimposed in the center.
- The reverse side has a circle in the center, loaded with two ancient swords crossed, surrounded by two branches of laurel, fruited, and tied at their proximal ends with a bow.
- The suspension ribbon is wavy silk, with a red background, longitudinally cut by five green stripes, each 0.0015 m (1.5 mm) wide and equidistant from each other and the edges of the ribbon; the width is 0.03 m (30 mm), with a length necessary to make the distance from the top of the ribbon to the lower edge of the decoration 0.09 m (90 mm), to obtain the lower alignment of the different insignia; in the center, a miniature war cross, surrounded by two branches of laurel, all in gold.

== History ==
During the Portuguese Colonial War, the following Cross of War medals were awarded:

Medals awarded
| Arm of Service | Number |
|---|---|
| Army | 2,634 |
| Navy | 68 |
| Air Force | 273 |
