= 1965 Portuguese presidential election =

- 25 July 1965
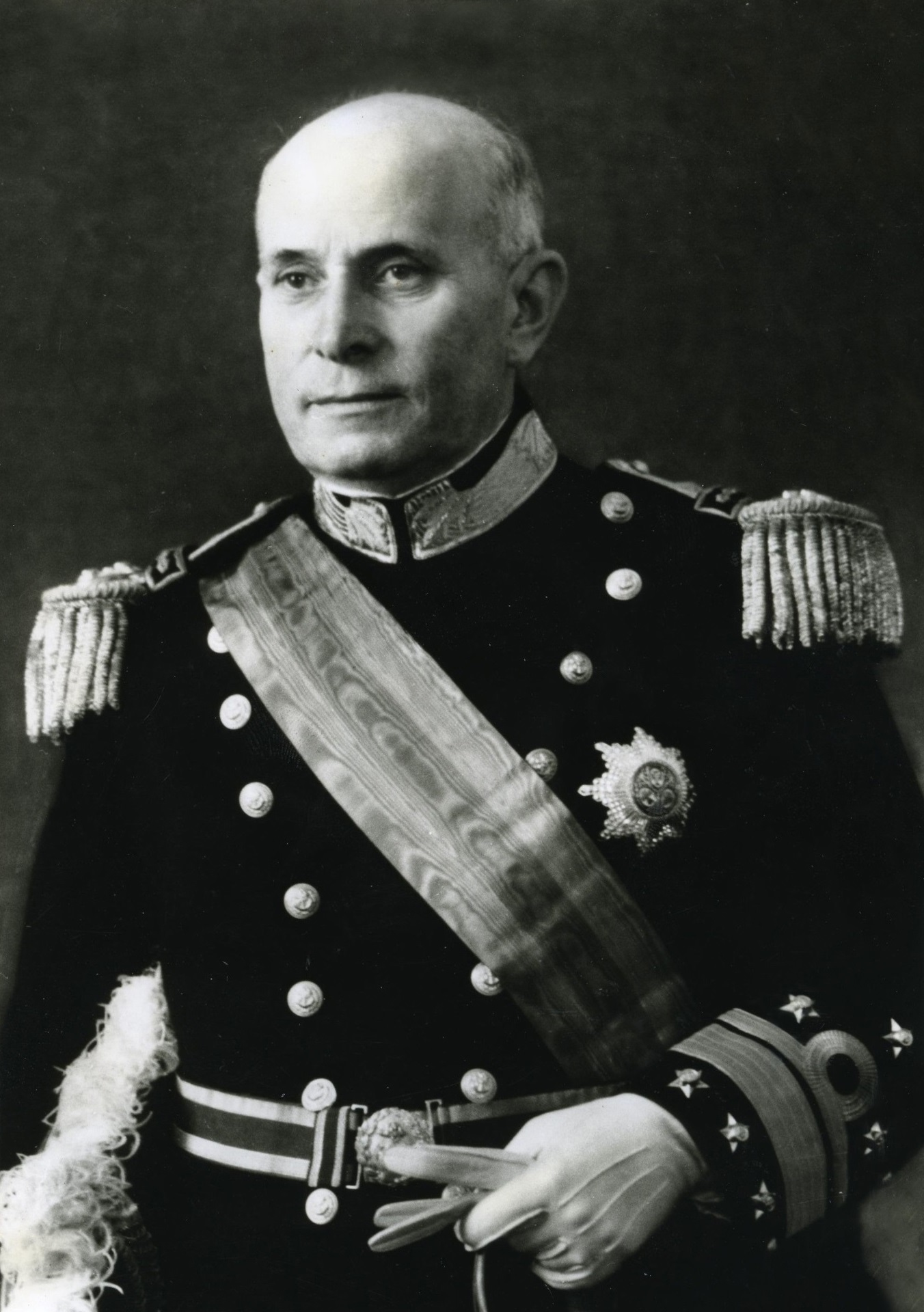
Candidate	Américo Tomás
Party	UN
Electoral vote	556
Percentage	100%
President before election
Américo Tomás
UN
Elected President
Américo Tomás
UN

Presidential elections were held in Portugal on 25 July 1965, during the Estado Novo regime of Prime Minister António de Oliveira Salazar, following parliamentary elections in the same year.

It was the first presidential election to be held by the National Assembly of Portugal rather than by direct popular ballot and, subsequently, rear admiral Américo Tomás was universally endorsed for a second seven-year term. His only opponent in the preceding 1958 election, general Humberto Delgado, had been assassinated in early 1965 following an attempt to return to Portugal from exile, possibly to contest Tomás' election for a second time.

== Results ==
Candidate	Party	Votes	%
Américo Tomás	National Union	556	100.00
Total		556	100.00
Valid votes		556	97.72
Invalid/blank votes		13	2.28
Total votes		569	100.00
