= Cruz de Guerra (Portugal) =

Valour Award of Portugal

War Cross (Cruz de Guerra)
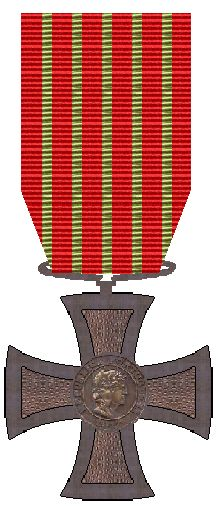
- Model 1917 class IV
- Type: Military decoration
- Awarded for: Acts of valor in combat
- Country: Portugal
- Eligibility: Portuguese military personnel and foreign soldiers serving with Portuguese forces
- Campaigns: World War I and Portuguese Colonial War
- Motto: Portuguese: REPÚBLICA PORTUGESA 1917 (Republic of Portugal 1917)
- Status: No longer awarded
- Established: 30 November 1916; 109 years ago
- Ribbon

Precedence
- Next (higher): Grand Officer of the Order of Aviz
- Equivalent: Grand Officer of the Order of Christ
- Next (lower): Distinguished Service Medal (Portugal)

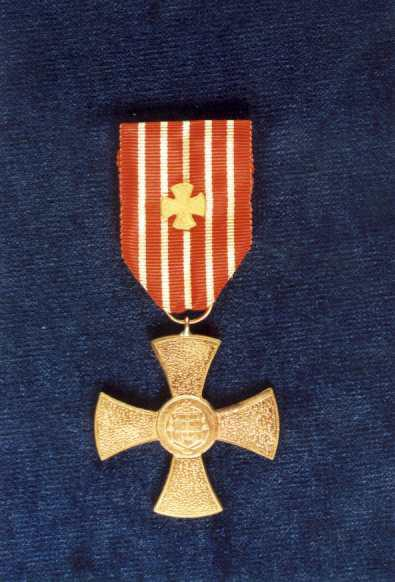
Model 1946 class II

The War Cross (Portuguese: Cruz de Guerra) – Portuguese military decoration.

== History ==
The decoration was established by Decree of the President of the Republic of Portugal No. 2:870 30 November 1916 to reward officers and soldiers who showed courage, determination, cold blood and other qualities in the face of the enemy during combat operations. Designation pursuant to art. 4 of the decree was to be awarded by the Minister of War, who on 26 July 1917, issued the statute of this decoration and its appearance. According to the decree, the decoration had 4 classes. This decoration was awarded to Portuguese soldiers participating in World War I, for whom this decoration was established. Later, it was also given to soldiers participating in battles in the Portuguese colonies. On 28 May 1946, on the basis of chapter III of the decree of the Minister of War, its statute and appearance were changed. The statute and appearance were changed again on the basis of chapter III of the decree of 20 December 1971, issued by the Minister of Defense.

== Rules for Awarding ==
Pursuant to the statute of 1917, this decoration could be awarded to officers and soldiers of the Portuguese army for deeds performed in the face of the enemy on the battlefield, and above all for courage, determination, cold blood and other praiseworthy deeds during the fight. Based on Article. 9 of the decree of 1946, in addition to Portuguese soldiers, the decoration could be awarded to soldiers of other armies cooperating with Portuguese troops, as well as civilians, both Portuguese citizens and foreigners. Whereas Art. 14 of the decree of 1971 specifies that the decoration may be awarded to Portuguese soldiers, as well as civilians, both Portuguese citizens and foreigners cooperating with the Portuguese army.

== Description ==
The badge of the decoration is made of bronze and has a shape similar to that of a Maltese cross. The design of the cross was built from a complex intersection of five circumferences. The cross badge was identical for all classes.

Based on Article. 1 of the Decree of 1917 on the obverse, in the center of the cross in a circle, there is a drawing depicting the profile of a woman's head with a laurel wreath, which symbolizes the republic, and around this drawing there is an inscription in Portuguese: REPÚBLICA PORTUGESA 1917 (Republic of Portugal 1917). The design is clearly based on the French medal of the same name. On the reverse of the badge, there is the coat of arms of Portugal in the central part within a circle. The designation of individual classes of the cross was on the ribbon of the cross. And so:

- Class I was marked with a ribbon device in the form of a golden cross surrounded by a laurel wreath,
- Class II - a golden cross,
- Class III - a silver cross,
- Class IV - did not have a device.

On the basis of the decree of 1946 the appearance of the badge was changed. On the obverse of the badge there is the coat of arms of Portugal (like the reverse from the pattern from 1917), while on the reverse there is the inscription Cruz de Guerra (English: Military Cross) in a circle. Another change in the appearance of the badge took place on the basis of the decree of 1971, when two crossed swords and a laurel wreath were placed on the reverse in the center of the cross in a circle, while the obverse remained identical as in the decree of 1946.

The medal was worn on a red ribbon with seven narrow green stripes. Symbols of individual classes were placed on the ribbon, a decoration in the form of:

- War Cross (Class I) (Note: Portuguese: Cruz de Guerra Class I – Device is a golden cross with a laurel wreath) – Class I: a golden cross with a laurel wreath
- War Cross (Class II) (Note: Portuguese: Cruz de Guerra Class II – Device is a gold cross) – Class II: a gold cross
- War Cross (Class III) (Note: Portuguese: Cruz de Guerra Class III – Device is a silver cross) – Class III: a silver cross
