= 1958 Portuguese presidential election =

- 8 June 1958
- Turnout: 77.35% (▲0.18pp)
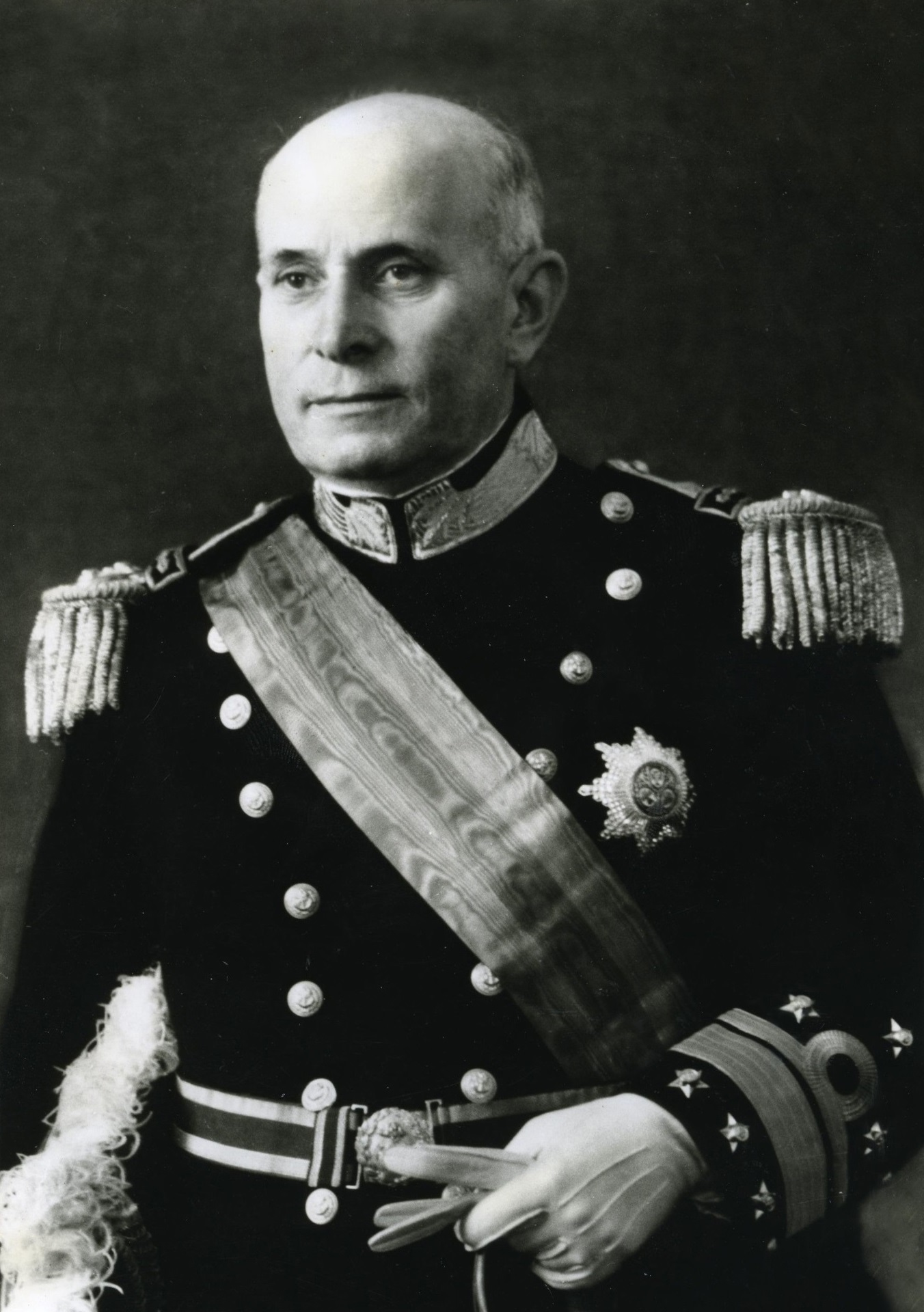

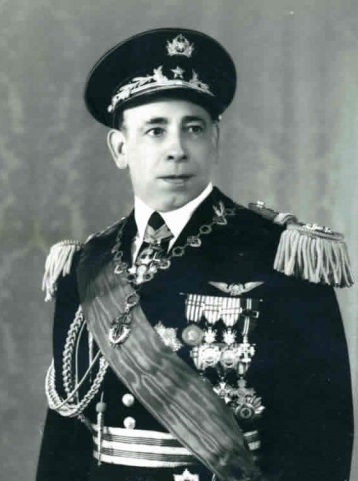
| Candidate | Américo Tomás | Humberto Delgado |
| Party | UN | Independent |
| Popular vote | 765,081 | 236,057 |
| Percentage | 76.42% | 23.58% |
- Results by district, councils and overseas provinces
President before election
Francisco Craveiro Lopes
UN
Elected President
Américo Tomás
UN

Presidential elections were held in Portugal on 8 June 1958, during the authoritarian Estado Novo regime led by Prime Minister António de Oliveira Salazar.

Incumbent President Francisco Craveiro Lopes had clashed with Salazar and did not seek another term, either as candidate of the regime or for the opposition, which deemed the incumbent president capable of winning the race. In Craveiro Lopes' place, the National Union, the sole legal political party, levied naval minister Américo Tomás, a conservative.

The democratic opposition backed Air Force General Humberto Delgado, who ran as an independent in an attempt to challenge the regime. When asked if he would retain Salazar if elected, Delgado famously replied, "Obviously, I'll sack him." Delgado knew that under Portugal's corporatist constitution, the president still had the right to dismiss the prime minister, which was effectively the only check on Salazar's power.

The official tally was 76.4 percent for Tomás and 23.6 percent for Delgado. The regime's secret police force, PIDE, harassed and attacked Delgado voters and supporters, and there were many reports of widespread electoral fraud. For example, Salazar refused to allow opposition representatives to observe the counting of ballots.

Many neutral observers believe that Delgado would have won in a landslide had Salazar allowed an honest election. Nevertheless, the results came as a shock to Salazar. Leaving nothing to chance, in 1959 he had the Constitution amended to transfer the presidential election to the National Assembly, which was a pliant tool of the regime. As a result, the 1958 election would be the only presidential election during the 48 years of the Second Portuguese Republic (in both of its incarnations as the Ditadura Nacional and the Estado Novo) in which an opposition candidate actually stayed in the race until election day. In previous years, whenever the opposition put forward any candidates at all, they were intimidated into withdrawing before the polls opened.

Universal suffrage was not reintroduced until after the Carnation Revolution and the return of democracy in 1974.

== Official results ==
| Candidate | Party | Votes | % |
|---|---|---|---|
| Américo Tomás | National Union | 765,081 | 76.42 |
| Humberto Delgado | Independent | 236,057 | 23.58 |
| Total | | 1,001,138 | 100.00 |
| Valid votes | | 1,001,138 | 99.97 |
| Invalid/blank votes | | 340 | 0.03 |
| Total votes | | 1,001,478 | 100.00 |
| Registered voters/turnout | | 1,294,779 | 77.35 |
Source: Fórum História, De Almeida, Presidency

=== Results by district ===
| District | Tomás | | Delgado | |
| District | Votes | % | Votes | % |
|---|---|---|---|---|
| Aveiro | 40,087 | 69.43% | 17,651 | 30.57% |
| Beja | 14,540 | 86.81% | 2,209 | 13.19% |
| Braga | 48,813 | 72.19% | 18,809 | 27.81% |
| Bragança | 19,534 | 75.93% | 6,193 | 24.07% |
| Castelo Branco | 30,783 | 93.13% | 2,271 | 6.87% |
| Coimbra | 33,944 | 71.35% | 13,629 | 28.65% |
| Évora | 13,101 | 77.22% | 3,865 | 22.78% |
| Faro | 22,179 | 86.69% | 3,405 | 13.31% |
| Guarda | 29,565 | 83.17% | 5,983 | 16.83% |
| Leiria | 33,284 | 76.14% | 10,433 | 23.86% |
| Lisbon | 110,939 | 71.90% | 43,359 | 28.10% |
| Portalegre | 16,542 | 81.27% | 3,812 | 18.73% |
| Porto | 69,174 | 66.10% | 35,473 | 33.90% |
| Santarém | 37,645 | 64.22% | 20,974 | 35.78% |
| Setúbal | 12,973 | 70.57% | 5,409 | 29.43% |
| Viana do Castelo | 20,797 | 73.91% | 7,342 | 26.09% |
| Vila Real | 26,899 | 85.62% | 4,519 | 14.38% |
| Viseu | 46,692 | 85.19% | 8,117 | 14.81% |
| Angra do Heroísmo | 11,255 | 99.72% | 32 | 0.28% |
| Funchal | 16,024 | 85.59% | 2,698 | 14.41% |
| Ponta Delgada | 13,796 | 95.25% | 688 | 4.75% |
| Angola | 22,295 | 67.71% | 10,630 | 32.29% |
| Cape Verde | 13,191 | 97.67% | 314 | 2.33% |
| Guinea | 1,624 | 79.07% | 430 | 20.93% |
| Macau | 1,507 | 100.00% | 0 | 0.00% |
| Mozambique | 13,385 | 61.29% | 8,454 | 38.71% |
| Portuguese India | 16,773 | 95.64% | 765 | 4.36% |
| São Tomé and Príncipe | 5,249 | 100.00% | 0 | 0.00% |
| Timor | 1,853 | 100.00% | 0 | 0.00% |
Source: Presidency
