= Albert du Roy de Blicquy =

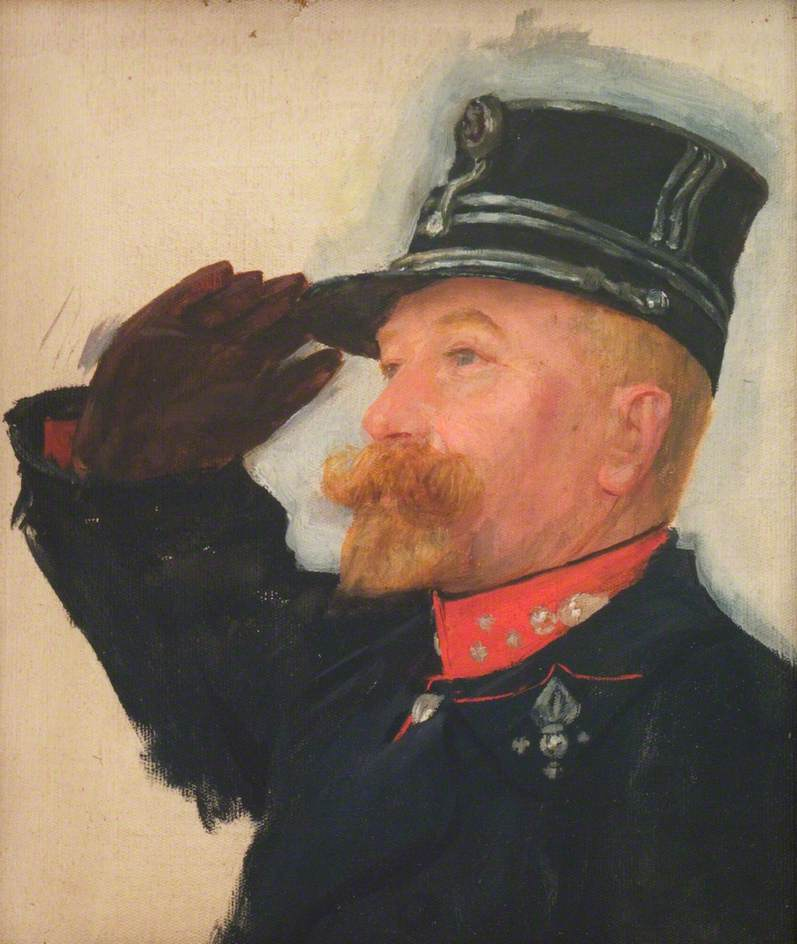
Colonel Albert du Roy de Blicquy, by Herbert Arnould Olivier, 1915

Lieutenant General Baron Albert Aquila Alexis Maria du Roy de Blicquy (June 12, 1869 – September 9, 1940) was a Belgian general.

== Family ==
He was born in the noble house of du Roy, from French aristocracy. He is the son of Fernand du Roy de Blicquy (1836–1913) and Leontine d'Hanins de Moerkerke (1843–1918). He married the Vicomtesse de Beughem.

== Career ==
He made a career at the Belgian royal court and was aide-de-camp to the Count of Flanders between 1898 and 1900. Later he became chief of the military household of the king. As Ordenance Officer to King Albert he was always around the king. A portrait of him was painted by Herbert Arnould Olivier in February 1915.

== Honours and awards ==
- Belgium:
  - War Cross.
  - Honorary Aide-de-camp of Their Majesties, King Albert and King Leopold.
  - Knight Grand Cross in the Order of the Crown.
  - Grand Officer in the Order of Leopold.
- Kingdom of Romania: Knight Grand Cross in the Order of the Crown.
- Kingdom of Portugal: Knight Grand Cross in the Order of Aviz.
- Thailand: Knight Grand Cross in the Most Exalted Order of the White Elephant.
