= Legião Portuguesa (Estado Novo) =

Portuguese paramilitary organization under the Second Portuguese Republic

Portuguese Legion
- Legião Portuguesa
- Abbreviation: LP
- Formation: 30 September 1936
- Dissolved: 25 April 1974
- Type: Paramilitary
- Legal status: Dissolved by law
- Purpose: "Fostering the moral resistance of the Nation and cooperating in its defense".
- Headquarters: Largo Penha da França 1, Lisbon, Portugal
- Coordinates: 38°43′47.7588″N 9°7′52.4172″W
- Region served: Portugal
- Parent organization: Ministry of the Interior, War Ministry
- Volunteers: 80,000 when dissolved

The Portuguese Legion (Portuguese: Legião Portuguesa) was a Portuguese paramilitary state organization founded in 1936 during the Portuguese President of the council's António de Oliveira Salazar's right-wing dictatorship, the Estado Novo. It was dissolved by law on April 25, 1974.

Its stated objectives were to "defend the spiritual heritage [of Portugal]" and to "fight the communist threat and anarchism".

The Portuguese Legion was under the control of the Ministry of the Interior and War, and was responsible for coordinating civil defense in Portuguese territory, including in the Portuguese Empire. It was deeply involved in multiple collaborations with PIDE, the political police. They used the Roman salute and also used to shout the name of Salazar in their parades.

== Membership ==
Membership in the Portuguese Legion was open to any person over 18 years of age.

Members of the Portuguese Legion were divided into three levels:
Escalão das Actividade Militares: included legionaries from the ages of 18 to 45.
Escalão Privativo da DCT: Members 45 and older.
Escalão de Serviços Moderados: Only open to members over the age of 60.

== Organisation ==
=== Naval Brigade ===
The Brigada Naval da LP was established on 5 December 1938, with the aim to revive maritime traditions of Portugal, and thus was affiliated to the Portuguese Navy. The Naval Brigade had a large amount of autonomy in relation to the rest of the Legion, having its own command and wearing a different uniform.

With the Naval Brigade as a reserve force for the Navy, its militia officers formed the Reserva Legionária (Reserva L) of the Navy.

The Naval Brigade was based at the Marinheiros Barracks in Alcântara, Lisbon — where it had a battalion and a band — and had detachments in Porto, Ponta Delgada and Angra do Heroísmo.

== Oath ==
The official oath of the Portuguese Legion was:

Portuguese Text

Como legionário, juro obediência aos meus chefes na defesa da Pátria e da ordem social
e afirmo solenemente pela minha honra que tudo sacrificarei, incluindo a própria vida, se tanto for necessário,
ao serviço da Nação, do seu património espiritual, da moral cristã e da liberdade da terra portuguesa.

English translation

As a Legionnaire, I swear obedience to my leaders in the defense of the Fatherland and of the social order
and solemnly affirm on my honor that I will sacrifice everything, including my life, if necessary,
for the service of the Nation, its spiritual heritage, of the Christian morality and freedom of the Portuguese land.

In addition to the legionnaires, there were subscribers who were not members of the LP, but contributed to its financing.

== Uniform ==
The uniform of the Portuguese Legion consisted of brown pants and a dolmã, a traditional Portuguese military tunic, a green shirt, and tie. In the Brigada Naval of the LP the trousers and dolmã were dark blue.

== War Cry ==
The official war cry of the Portuguese Legion was:

Portuguese Text

Legionários, quem vive?
Portugal! Portugal! Portugal!
Legionários, quem manda?
Salazar! Salazar! Salazar!

English translation

Legionnaires, who lives?
Portugal! Portugal! Portugal!
Legionaries, who rules?
Salazar! Salazar! Salazar!

== See also ==
- Provincial organization of volunteers and civil defence, equivalent in some colonies of the Portuguese Empire
- Mocidade Portuguesa, the Estado Novo's youth organization
- União Nacional, the Estado Novo's single party
- Humberto Delgado
- Yves Guérin-Sérac

== Sources ==
- ARAÚJO, Rui. The Empire of Spies . Alfragide: Book Workshop, 2010
- RODRIGUES, Luís Nuno. The Portuguese Legion: a new state militia (1936–1944) . Lisbon: Editorial Estampa, 1996.
- SILVA, Joshua's. Portuguese Legion: repressive force of fascism . Lisbon: Diabril Publisher 1975.
