= 1972 Portuguese presidential election =

← 1965	25 July 1972	1976 →
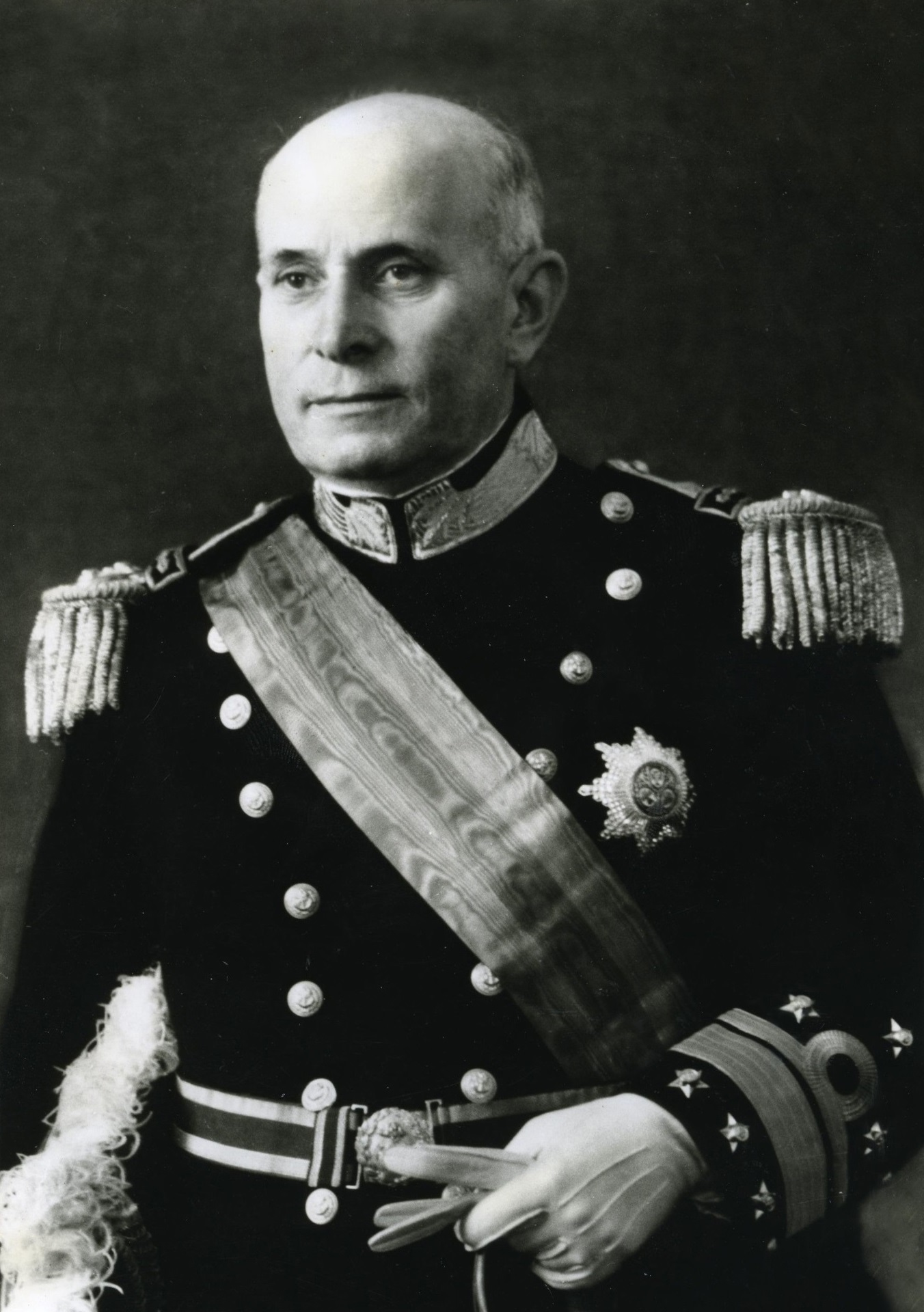
Candidate	Américo Tomás
Party	ANP
Electoral vote	616
Percentage	95.50%
President before election
Américo Tomás
ANP
Elected President
Américo Tomás
ANP

Presidential elections under the Estado Novo regime was held for the last time on 25 July 1972, the only one not controlled by late Prime Minister António de Oliveira Salazar, with the last elections for the National Assembly held the following year, less than a year before the Carnation Revolution. Incumbent President and former Naval Minister Américo Tomás of the ruling People's National Action was the sole candidate, and was re-elected unopposed by the regime-dominated National Assembly for a third seven-year term, which would have ended on 25 July 1979.

== Results ==
Candidate	Party	Votes	%
Américo Tomás	People's National Action	616	95.50
Against		29	4.50
Total		645	100.00
Source: Hunt
