= António Sérgio =

Portuguese educationist and writer (1883–1969)

António Sérgio de Sousa (September 3, 1883 – February 12, 1969) was an influential educationist, philosopher, journalist, sociologist and essayist from Portugal.

== Background ==
He was the only son and representative of António Sérgio de Sousa (October 22, 1842 – Lisbon, Portugal August 18, 1906) - only son and representative of the 98th Governor-General of Portuguese India, 64th Governor of Angola, 59th Governor of Macau and 1st Viscount of Sérgio de Sousa -, and second wife (m. India, Bombay, Church of Our Lady of the Glory of Mazagão, October 22, 1879) Ana Maria Henriques de Brito (Pondá, Novas Conquistas, Goa, July 23, 1855 – Lisbon, Portugal, January 23, 1948).

Sérgio was an important intellectual, thinker, and Portuguese politician. Born in Damão, India he was influenced by the contact with different cultures. He lived many years in Africa, becoming a cosmopolitan character because, following a family tradition, he studied at the Military College, in Lisbon, Portugal completing the course of the Navy of War, after which he traveled to Cape Verde and Macao, China. He left the Navy with the establishment of the Republic in 1910. Sérgio did not consider the issue of republic versus monarchy important. For him, the economic progress and welfare of Portugal was more significant. He spoke about "socialism", although this was not connected with "Marxist socialism". Sérgio was located in a social democratic political line, admiring England, a position similar to the one adopted by the countries of Scandinavia and their Social-Democratic Parties. Sérgio died in Lisbon, Portugal.

== Culture ==
He was a personal friend of Adolphe Ferrière, Claparède and Paul Langevin - the doctoral advisor of Louis de Broglie (Nobel Prize for Physics in 1929); he was teacher, including at the University of Santiago de Compostela (in 1933) and, by all this, influenced characters as his friend Barahona Fernandes - one of the most distinguished Portuguese psychiatrists - the architect Raul Lino, the Educator Rui Grácio and Mário Soares. One may consider him as an "Educator of Generations". He was Minister of "Public Instruction" for two months and ten days in the government of Alvaro de Castro (1923-12-18 to 1924-02-28).

== Political action ==
He was a permanent political opponent of the regime of António de Oliveira Salazar, which lasted from 1926 to 1974. He was also linked to the foundation of the Portuguese Socialist Party and to the Humberto Delgado candidacy of the Presidential Elections of 1958. (Humberto Delgado was later murdered by the PIDE, political police of "Salazarism"). Sérgio was arrested in 1910, 1933, 1935, 1948 and 1958. And about this he thought (and wrote) that it was in prison he found the true "national unity" - to oppose the military dictatorship, first, and then Salazar.

He left an enormous work on Education, Epistemology, Culture, History and Politics, especially in his Essays. Most of the political activity of Sérgio is always compatible with its theoretical aspect - the linking of democracy and freedom as means for Education and Culture. He was also important for his contribution to the introduction of Cooperatives in Portugal.

"The essential principle of democracy is never trust in those who are in the Govern" he wrote. His work influenced many important younger Portuguese, men of culture, science or politics.

== Family ==
He married in Lisbon, São Mamede, at the Chapel of the Nunciature, on June 14, 1910, to Luísa Estefânia Gerschey da Silva (Lisbon, September 4, 1879 – Lisbon, Lapa, February 29, 1960), daughter of Manuel José da Silva (Lisbon, Mártires, August 4, 1854 – July 23, 1932), a natural son of one of the brothers of the 1st Viscount and 1st Count of Ribeiro da Silva and of Italian and English descent, and wife German Maria Estefânia Gerschey (Lisbon, Alcântara, November 30, 1859 – 1959), without issue.
