= Ministry of War (Portugal) =

The War Ministry (Ministério da Guerra) was the government department responsible for the administration of the Portuguese Army between 1820 and 1950.

O Ministério da Guerra (MG) era o antigo departamento governamental de Portugal responsável pela administração dos assuntos relativos ao Exército Português. Em 1950 passou a designar-se "Ministério do Exército (ME)".

== History ==
The department was established in 1820 as the Secretariat of State for War Affairs (Portuguese: Secretaria de Estado dos Negócios da Guerra), following the division of the former Secretariat of State for Foreign and War Affairs (Portuguese: Secretaria de Estado dos Negócios Estrangeiros e da Guerra into two separate ministries. The term "Secretariat of State" was replaced by "Ministry" toward the end of the 19th century.

In 1950, the Ministry of War was renamed Army Ministry (Ministério do Exército)..

Following the coup of 25 April 1974, the Ministry of the Army was replaced by the Ministry of National Defence. The Chief of the Army Staff (CEME) was granted a status equivalent to that of a minister, assuming the responsibilities previously held by the Minister of the Army.

In the wake of the 1982 constitutional revision, the former political functions of the Minister of the Army were transferred almost entirely to the Minister of National Defense, with the Chief of the Army Staff (CEME) returning to a role focused exclusively on military functions.

=== Ministers of National Defense (1950–1974) ===
- Fernando dos Santos Costa (1950–1955)
- Júlio Botelho Moniz (1955–1961)
- António de Oliveira Salazar (1961–1962)
- Manuel Gomes de Araújo (1962–1968)
- Horácio José de Sá Viana Rebelo (1968–1973)
- Joaquim Moreira da Silva Cunha (1973–25 April 1974)
