= Marcello Caetano =

Prime Minister of Portugal from 1968 to 1974

Marcello Caetano GCC GCSE GCTE
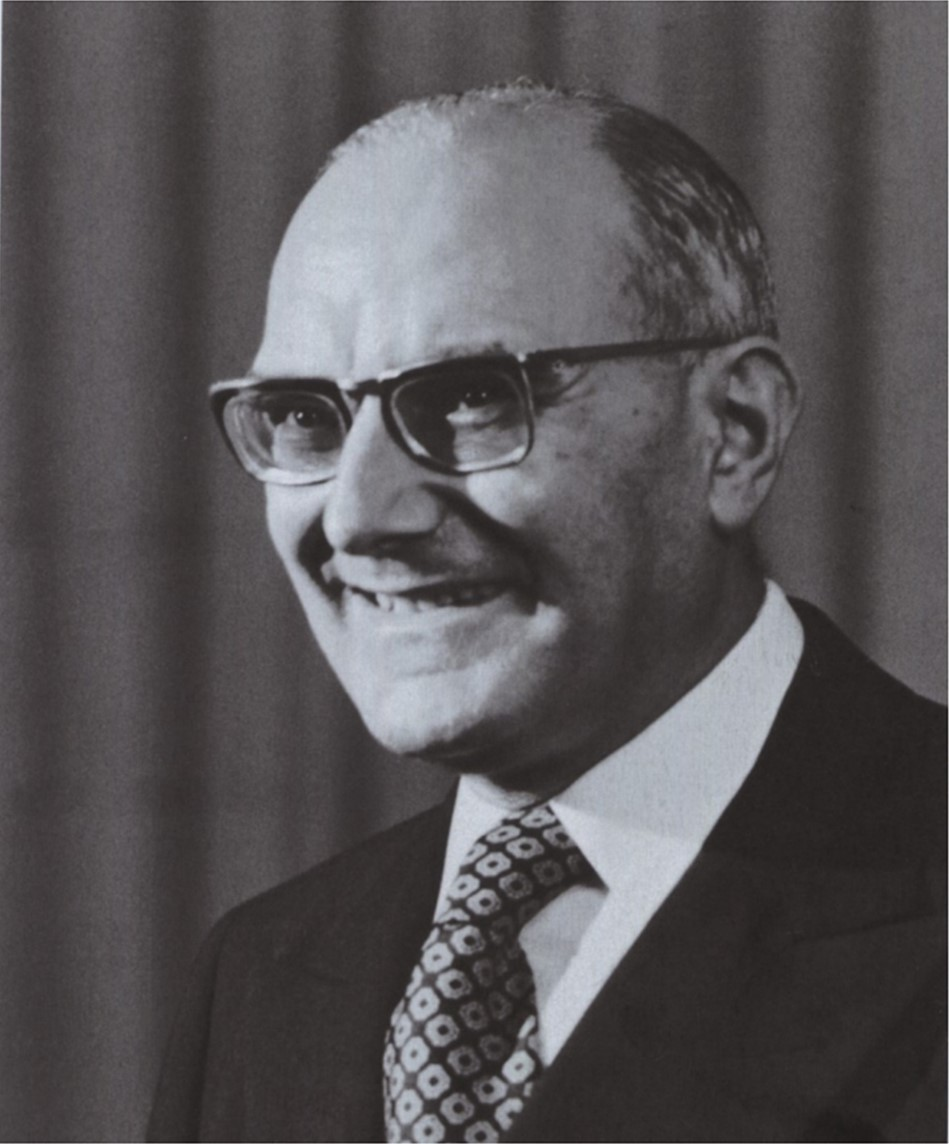

Prime Minister of Portugal
- In office 27 September 1968 – 25 April 1974
- President: Américo Tomás
- Preceded by: António de Oliveira Salazar
- Succeeded by: National Salvation Junta

Rector of the University of Lisbon
- In office 20 January 1959 – 12 April 1962
- Preceded by: Victor Hugo Duarte de Lemos
- Succeeded by: Paulo Cunha

Minister of the Presidency
- In office 7 July 1955 – 14 August 1958
- Prime Minister: António de Oliveira Salazar
- Preceded by: João Pinto da Costa Leite
- Succeeded by: Pedro Teotónio Pereira

President of the Corporative Chamber
- In office 25 November 1949 – 7 July 1955
- Preceded by: José Gabriel Pinto Coelho
- Succeeded by: João Pinto da Costa Leite

Minister of the Colonies
- In office 6 September 1944 – 4 February 1947
- Prime Minister: António de Oliveira Salazar
- Preceded by: Francisco Vieira Machado
- Succeeded by: Teófilo Duarte

National Commissioner of the Portuguese Youth
- In office 16 August 1940 – 6 September 1944
- Appointed by: António Carneiro Pacheco
- Preceded by: Francisco José Nobre Guedes
- Succeeded by: José Porto Soares Franco

Member of the Corporative Chamber
- In office 25 November 1949 – 7 July 1955
- Section: President of the Presidium
- In office 24 November 1942 – 26 November 1945
- Section: Policy and administration
- In office 10 January 1935 – 25 November 1938
- Section: Credit and insurance
Offices held ad interim
Minister of Foreign Affairs
Acting; 6 October 1969 – 15 January 1970
Prime Minister	Himself
Preceded by	Alberto Franco Nogueira
Succeeded by	Rui Patrício
Acting; 29 May 1957 – 27 June 1957
Prime Minister	António de Oliveira Salazar
Preceded by	Paulo Cunha
Succeeded by	Paulo Cunha
Acting; 23 December 1956 – 11 February 1957
Prime Minister	António de Oliveira Salazar
Preceded by	Paulo Cunha
Succeeded by	Paulo Cunha
Minister of Communications
Acting; 4 January 1956 – 1 February 1956
Prime Minister	António de Oliveira Salazar
Preceded by	Manuel Gomes de Araújo
Succeeded by	Manuel Gomes de Araújo

Personal details
- Born: Marcello José das Neves Alves Caetano; 17 August 1906 Graça, Lisbon, Kingdom of Portugal
- Died: 26 October 1980 (aged 74) Copacabana, Rio de Janeiro, Brazil
- Resting place: São João Batista Cemetery, Botafogo, Rio de Janeiro, Brazil
- Party: National Union
- Spouse: Teresa Teixeira de Queirós de Barros (m. 1930; died 1971)
- Children: 4
- Education: Camões Secondary School
- Alma mater: University of Lisbon

Marcello José das Neves Alves Caetano (Note: European Portuguese pronunciation: [mɐɾˈsɛlu kɐjˈtɐnu], Brazilian Portuguese pronunciation: [maɾˈsɛlu kajˈtɐnu].) GCC GCSE GCTE (17 August 1906 – 26 October 1980) was a Portuguese jurist and politician. He was the second and last dictator of the Estado Novo after succeeding António de Oliveira Salazar. He served as President of the Council of Ministers of Portugal from 1968 to 1974, when he was overthrown during the Carnation Revolution.

== Early life and career ==
He was the son of José Maria de Almeida Alves Caetano and his first wife Josefa Maria das Neves. Graduated as a Licentiate and later a Doctorate in Law, Caetano was a Cathedratic Professor at the Faculty of Law of the University of Lisbon. A conservative politician and a self-proclaimed reactionary in his youth, Caetano started his political career in the 1930s, during the early days of the regime of António de Oliveira Salazar.

Caetano soon became an important figure in the Estado Novo government, and in 1940, he was appointed chief of the Portuguese Youth Organisation. Caetano progressed in his academic career at the university, published several works and lectured law. In jail for political reasons, Álvaro Cunhal, a law student, the future leader of the Portuguese Communist Party, submitted his final thesis on the topic of abortion before a faculty jury that included Caetano.

Between 1944 and 1947, Caetano was minister of the colonies, and in 1947, he became the president of the executive board of the National Union. He also served as president of the Corporative Chamber between 1949 and 1955.

From 1955 to 1958, he was the minister attached to the presidency of the Council of Ministers and was the most powerful man in the regime after Salazar, who was approaching the age of retirement. Their relationship was tense at times, which stopped Caetano from being a clear successor. He returned to his academic career and maintained formally-important political functions such as the executive president of the National Union, Caetano became the ninth rector of the University of Lisbon from 1959, but the Academic Crisis of 1962 led him to resign after protesting students clashed with riot police in the campus. On the other hand, students who supported the regime tried to boycott the anti-regime activism. There were indeed three generations of militants of the radical right at the Portuguese universities and schools between 1945 and 1974 who were guided by a revolutionary nationalism partly influenced by the political subculture of European neofascism. The core of these radical students' struggle lay in an uncompromising defence of the Portuguese Empire in the days of the fascist regime.

== Prime minister ==
In August 1968, Salazar suffered a stroke after a fall in his home and went into a coma. After 36 years in office, the 79-year-old was dismissed by President Américo Tomás (or Thomaz). Thomaz appointed Caetano to replace Salazar on 27 September 1968. However, no one informed the recovered Salazar that he had been removed as leader of the regime that he had largely created. By some accounts, when Salazar died in July 1970, he still believed he was prime minister.

Many people hoped that Caetano would soften the edges of Salazar's authoritarian regime and modernise the economy. Caetano moved to foster economic growth and some social improvements, such as the awarding of a monthly pension to rural workers who had never had the chance to pay social security. The three objectives of Caetano's pension reform were to enhance equity, reduce the fiscal and actuarial imbalance and achieve more efficiency for the economy as a whole such as by establishing contributions that were less distortive to labour markets and allowing the savings generated by pension funds to increase the investments in the economy. Some large-scale investments were made at the national level, such as the building of a major oil processing center in Sines.

The economy reacted very well at first, but in the 1970s, some serious problems began to show, partly because double-digit inflation started 1970 and partly because of the short-term effects of the 1973 oil crisis despite the largely-unexploited oil reserves, which Portugal had in its overseas territories in Angola and São Tomé and Príncipe that were being developed and promised to become sources of wealth in the medium to long term.

Caetano's political power was largely held in check by Thomaz. On paper, the president's power to remove Salazar had been the only check on his power. Thomaz, like his predecessors, had largely been a figurehead under Salazar. Indeed, Thomaz' decision to sack Salazar was the only time he used his presidential powers during his first decade in office. However, Thomaz was not willing to give as free a hand to Caetano.

Although Caetano had been one of the architects of the Estado Novo, he took some steps to blunt the harsher edges of the regime in the so-called "political spring" (also called Marcellist Spring – Primavera Marcellista). He referred to his regime as a "social state" and changed the name of the official party, the National Union to the "People's National Action" (Ação Nacional Popular). The PIDE (Polícia Internacional e de Defesa do Estado, International and State Defense Police), the dreaded secret police, was renamed the DGS (Direcção-Geral de Segurança, General-Directorate of Security). He also eased press censorship and allowed the first independent labor unions since the 1920s.

Even with those reforms, the conduct of the 1969 and 1973 legislative elections was little different from past elections over the previous 40 years. The opposition was barely tolerated. While opposition candidates were theoretically allowed to stand (as had been the case since 1945), they were subjected to harsh repression. In both elections, the People's National Action swept every seat as before. The National Assembly was considered as not a chamber for parties but popular representatives, who were chosen and elected on a single list. In the only presidential election held under Caetano, in 1972, Thomaz was elected unopposed by the government-controlled legislature.

The reforms did not go nearly far enough for large elements of the population that were eager for more freedom and had no memory of the instability that preceded Salazar. However, even those reforms had to be extracted with some effort from the more hardline members of the government, especially Thomaz.

At bottom, Caetano was still an authoritarian himself. The heavy-handed repression of opposition figures even during the "political spring" showed he was not willing to move toward democracy. He was very disappointed when the opposition was not content with the meager reforms he was able to wring out of the hardliners. After the 1973 elections, the regime's hardliners used their proximity to Thomaz to pressure Caetano into abandoning his reform experiment. He had little choice but to acquiesce, since he had spent nearly all of his political capital to enact his reforms in the first place.

Portuguese overseas territories in Africa during the Estado Novo regime: Angola and Mozambique were by far the two largest territories.

Since the early 1960s, the Portuguese overseas provinces in Africa had been struggling for independence, but the government in Lisbon, was not willing to concede it, and Salazar sent troops to fight the guerrillas and the terrorism of the independence movements. By 1970, the war in Africa was consuming as much as 40% of the Portuguese budget, and there was no solution in sight. At a military level, despite the containment of the various independence movements with differentiating levels of success, their impending presence and their failure to disappear dominated public anxiety. Throughout the war, Portugal also faced increasing dissent, arms embargoes and other punitive sanctions imposed by most of the international community.

After spending the early years of his priesthood in Africa, the British priest Adrian Hastings created a storm in 1973 with an article in The Times about the "Wiriyamu Massacre" in Mozambique. He revealed that the Portuguese Army had massacred 400 villagers in the village of Wiriyamu, near Tete, in December 1972.

His report was printed a week before Caetano was supposed to visit Britain to celebrate the 600th anniversary of the Anglo-Portuguese alliance. Portugal's growing isolation following Hastings's claims has often been cited as a factor that helped to bring about the Carnation Revolution, a coup that deposed Caetano's regime in 1974.

By the early 1970s, the counterinsurgency war had been won in Angola, it was less than satisfactorily contained in Mozambique and dangerously stalemated in Portuguese Guinea and so the Portuguese government decided to create sustainability policies to allow continuous sources of financing for the war effort for the long run. On 13 November 1972, a sovereign wealth fund, the Fundo do Ultramar (Overseas Fund) was enacted to finance the counterinsurgency effort in the Portuguese overseas territories. In addition, new decree laws (Decretos-Leis n.os 353, de 13 de Julho de 1973, e 409, de 20 de Agosto) were enforced to reduce military expenses and increase the number of officers by incorporating irregular militia as if they were regular military academy officers.

== Overthrow ==
By the beginning of 1974, signals of rebellion increased. The left-wing Armed Forces Movement was formed within the army and started planning a coup to end the regime. In March, an unsuccessful coup attempt was made against the regime from the right, organised by General Kaúlza de Arriaga. By then, Caetano had offered his resignation to the president more than once but his request was denied. There was now little attempt or political possibility of controlling the movements of the opposition.

On 25 April 1974, the left-wing military overthrew the regime in the Carnation Revolution. Caetano resigned and was taken into military custody.

The combined African independentist guerrilla forces of the People's Movement for the Liberation of Angola (MPLA), the National Union for the Total Independence of Angola (UNITA) and the National Liberation Front of Angola (FNLA) in Angola; the PAIGC in Portuguese Guinea and the FRELIMO in Mozambique succeeded in their nationalistic rebellion when their continued guerrilla warfare prompted elements of the Portuguese Armed Forces to stage a coup at Lisbon in 1974.

The Armed Forces Movement overthrew the Lisbon government as a protest against the ongoing war in Portuguese Guinea that seemed to have no military end in sight, to rebel against the new military laws that were to be presented the next year (Decretos-Leis n.os 353, de 13 de Julho de 1973, e 409, de 20 de Agosto), to reduce military expenses and to incorporate militia and military academy officers in the army branches as equals.

== Later life ==
After Caetano had resigned, he was flown under custody to the Madeira islands, where he stayed for a few days. He then flew to exile to Brazil, which was ruled by its own dictatorship. In Brazil, he continued his academic activity as director of the Institute of Comparative Law at Gama Filho University in Rio de Janeiro. He died in Copacabana in Rio de Janeiro of a heart attack in 1980. He was buried in the São João Batista cemetery in Botafogo.

== Publications ==
Caetano published several books, including several highly rated law books and two books of memoirs in exile: Minhas Memórias de Salazar (My Memories of Salazar) and Depoimento (Testimony).

He was one of the world's greatest authorities in administrative law, and some of his works were studied even in Soviet universities. He also wrote Os nativos na economía africana in 1954. During his exile in Brazil, he pursued academic activities and published works on administrative and constitutional law.

== Personal life ==
On 27 October 1930, Caetano married Maria Teresa Teixeira de Queirós de Barros, the sister of the politician Henrique de Barros. They had four children:

- José Maria de Barros Alves Caetano (b. Lisbon, 16 August 1933)
- João de Barros Alves Caetano (Lisbon, 12 December 1931 – 27 June 2009)
- Miguel de Barros Alves Caetano (b. Lisbon, São Sebastião da Pedreira, 26 July 1935)
- Ana Maria de Barros Alves Caetano (b. Lisbon, 7 December 1937)

== Notes ==
Political offices
Preceded by Francisco José Nobre Guedes	National Commissioner of the Portuguese Youth; 1940–1944	Succeeded by José Porto Soares Franco
Preceded by Francisco Vieira Machado	Minister of the Colonies; 1944–1945; 1944–1947	Succeeded by Américo Tomás (acting)
Preceded by Américo Tomás (acting)	Minister of the Colonies; 1944–1945; 1944–1947	Succeeded by Teófilo Duarte
Preceded by José Gabriel Pinto Coelho	President of the Corporative Chamber; 1949–1955	Succeeded by João Pinto da Costa Leite
Preceded by João Pinto da Costa Leite	Minister of the Presidency; 1955–1958	Succeeded by Pedro Teotónio Pereira
Preceded by Manuel Gomes de Araújo	Minister of Communications; Acting; 1956	Succeeded by Manuel Gomes de Araújo
Preceded by Paulo Cunha	Minister of Foreign Affairs; Acting; 1956–1957; 1957	Succeeded by Paulo Cunha
Preceded by António de Oliveira Salazar	Prime Minister of Portugal; 1968–1974	Succeeded by National Salvation Junta
Preceded by Alberto Franco Nogueira	Minister of Foreign Affairs; Acting; 1969–1970	Succeeded by Rui Patrício
Party political offices
Preceded by António de Oliveira Salazar	Leader of the National Union; 1968–1970	Party dissolved
Party founded	Leader of the People's National Action; 1970–1974	Party dissolved
Academic offices
Preceded by Victor Hugo Duarte de Lemos	Rector of the University of Lisbon; 1959–1962	Succeeded by Paulo Cunha
Preceded by Serafim Leite	Corresponding partner of the Brazilian Academy of Letters – chair 1; 1970–1980	Succeeded by António Alçada Baptista
