= Júlio Botelho Moniz =

Portuguese general and politician

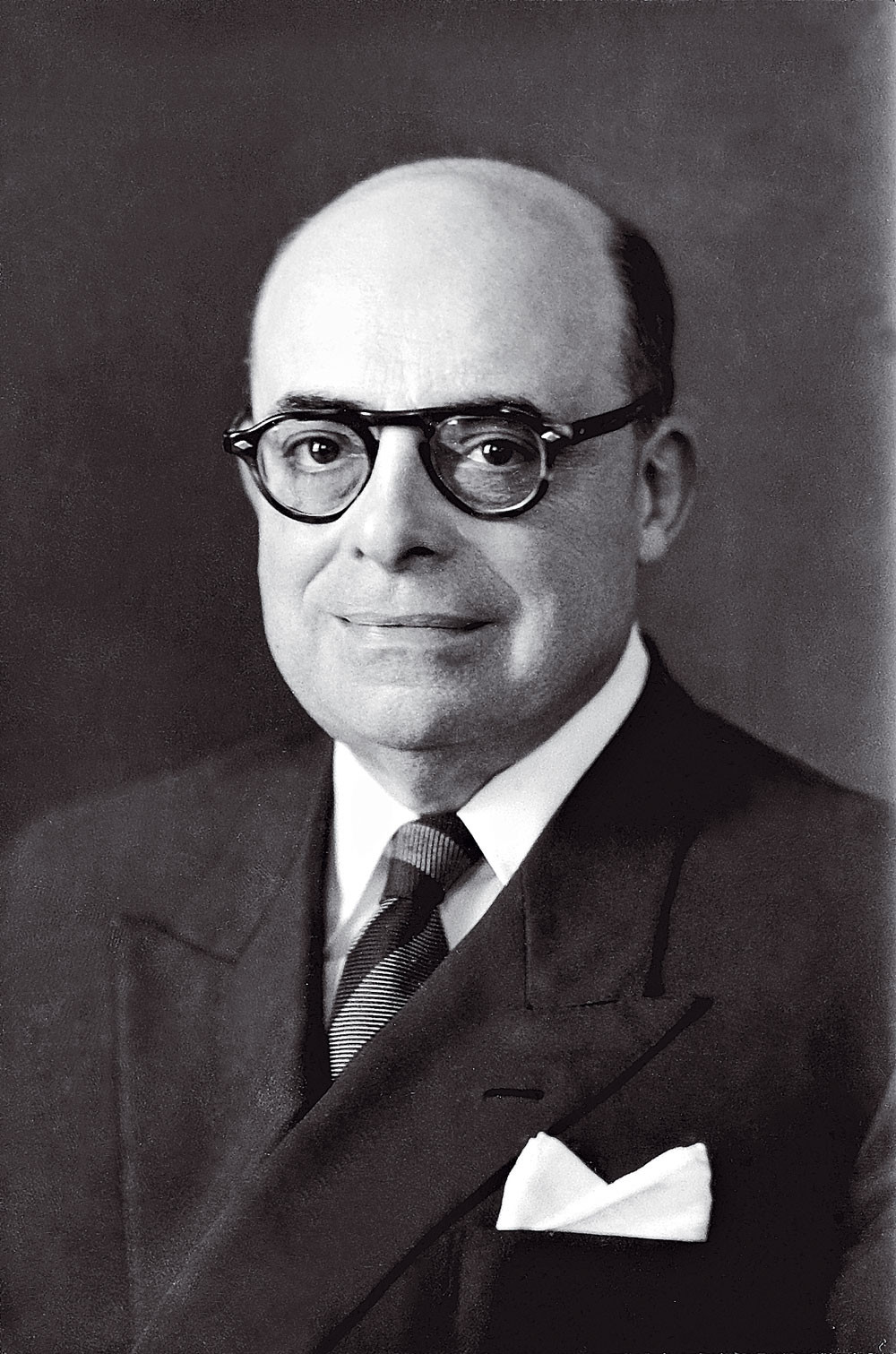
Botelho Moniz

Júlio Carlos Alves Dias Botelho Moniz (Lisbon, 12 October 1900 – Lisbon, 30 September 1970) was a Portuguese general and politician. Botelho Moniz owed his political and military career (Minister of the Interior and Defence, Chief General of the Armed Forces, representative of the Portuguese Army, as an observer on the East Front of the Second World War) to Fernando Santos Costa's close protection.

== Coup attempt ==
After he was nominated Minister of Defence (following Santos Costa in that position), Botelho Moniz became receptive towards the discontent felt by certain members of the military hierarchy against the Estado Novo regime. On 8 April 1961, he was one of the prominent participants in an aborted coup d'état, also supported by the former President Craveiro Lopes and some of his colleagues. The attempt to overthrow António de Oliveira Salazar failed because the "coup" was ill-prepared, enabling the dictator to react promptly. Some believe that Botelho Moniz developed contacts with the United States, as the Americans, under President John F. Kennedy's new policy, were allegedly willing to discreetly support changes in the political orientation of the Portuguese administration.

== See also ==
- Estado Novo (Portugal)
- Portuguese Colonial War
