= Mocidade Portuguesa =

Portuguese youth organization

Portuguese Youth
- Mocidade Portuguesa
- Formation: 1936
- Dissolved: 1974
- Type: Youth organisation
- Legal status: Defunct
- Region served: Portugal
- Parent organization: National Union

The Mocidade Portuguesa (Portuguese pronunciation: [musiˈðaðɨ puɾtuˈɣezɐ], English: Portuguese Youth) was a Portuguese youth organisation founded in 1936 (dissolved in 1974) under the authoritarian regime of Prime Minister Salazar's Estado Novo. Membership was compulsory between the ages of 7 and 14, and voluntary until the age of 25. A documentary film made in 1939 gives an insight into its activities, attitudes and values.

== History ==
Founded in 1936 by Tiago Franco, the Mocidade was originally inspired by the models of the Italian Fascist Opera Nazionale Balilla and the Nazi Hitler Youth. During 1936 and 1944 the Mocidade had close relations with the Hitler Youth, Opera Nazionale Balilla and the Spanish Frente de Juventudes. However, in 1940 the Germanophile National Secretary Francisco Nobre Guedes was replaced by the anglophile Marcelo Caetano, who took the organisation in a different direction after World War II, because it was seen by many as a fascist organisation. With the defeat of Nazism, the Mocidade backed away from the Hitler Youth mode of organisation. It abandoned its paramilitary feature, adding more features from Roman Catholic youth groups and other youth organisations such as the Scout Movement. But these changes only came to full realisation after the death of Salazar, because in many ways throughout his lifetime the Mocidade still retained some fascist ideas such as the cult of the leader (Salazar) and the Roman salute. When Caetano assumed the leadership of Portugal in 1968, still under the Estado Novo, he largely forgot the Mocidade, and many older members of the organisation even claimed that he was a democrat and an Anti-fascist. A number of dissents left the Mocidade at this time and created the Movimento Juventude Portugal (Portuguese Youth Movement), which was a strongly fascist and Salazarist youth organisation resembling the Mocidade in the days of Salazar, although it was not supported by the Government and was dissolved after the Carnation Revolution.

== Organisation ==
Members of the Portuguese Youth were divided into four groups by age:

- Lusitos: 7 to 10 years;
- Infantes: 10 to 14 years;
- Vanguardistas: 14 to 17 years;
- Cadetes: 17 to 25 years.

== Overseas ==
By decree 29453, White Portuguese citizens living in the then Portuguese colonies, as well as "assimilated" indigenous youths, were permitted to join the Portuguese Youth.

Standard of the Mocidade Portuguesa Feminina (based on the flag of King John I).

== Mocidade Portuguesa Feminina ==
The "Female Portuguese Youth" was founded in 1937 as the female division of the Portuguese Youth. The goal of the Female Portuguese Youth was to teach young women "the proper mission of a woman's performance in the family and the state".

== Dissolution ==
Both groups were dissolved in 1974, after the Carnation Revolution, because of its connections to the far-right Estado Novo regime.

== See also ==
- National Union (Portugal)
- Legião Portuguesa (Estado Novo)
