= Francisco Craveiro Lopes =

President of Portugal From 1951 to 1958

His Excellency Francisco Craveiro Lopes CvTE ComC GCA GCB
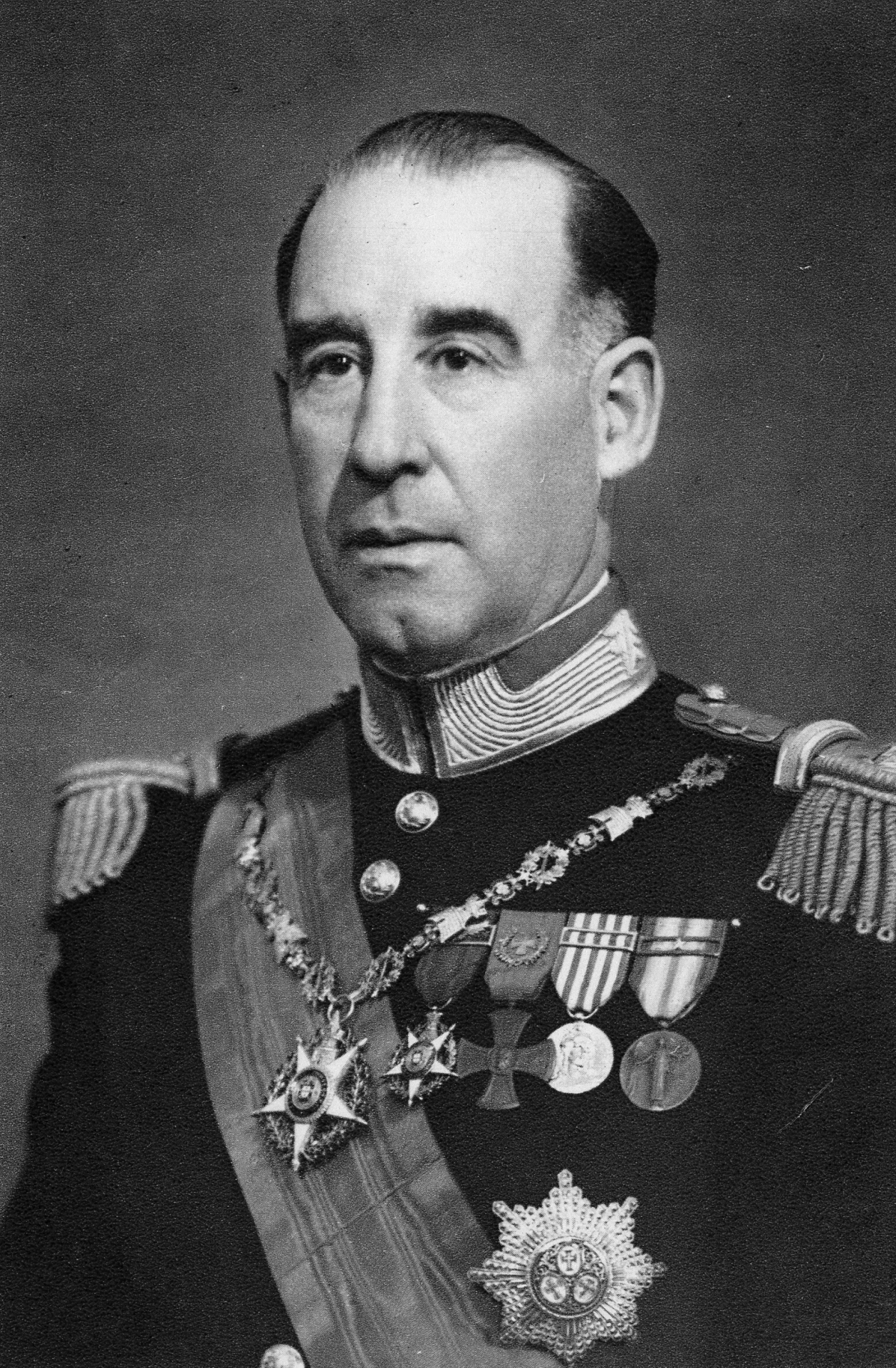
- Official portrait, 1951

President of Portugal
- In office 9 August 1951 – 9 August 1958
- Prime Minister: António de Oliveira Salazar
- Preceded by: Óscar Carmona
- Succeeded by: Américo Tomás

Governor of Portuguese India
- Acting; September 1936 – July 1938
- President: Óscar Carmona
- Prime Minister: António de Oliveira Salazar
- Minister of the Colonies: Francisco Vieira Machado
- Preceded by: João Carlos Craveiro Lopes
- Succeeded by: José Ricardo Pereira Cabral

Member of the National Assembly
- In office 26 November 1945 – 18 June 1951
- Constituency: Coimbra

Personal details
- Born: Francisco Higino Craveiro Lopes; 12 April 1894 Lisbon, Kingdom of Portugal
- Died: 2 September 1964 (aged 70) Lisbon, Portuguese Republic
- Party: National Union
- Spouse: Berta Craveiro Lopes
- Children: 4
- Education: Lisbon Polytechnic School
- Profession: Air force officer
- Awards: Order of Christ; Order of Aviz; Order of the Tower and Sword; Order of the Bath; Royal Victorian Chain

Military service
- Allegiance: Portugal
- Branch/service: Portuguese Air Force
- Years of service: 1911–1964
- Rank: Marshal of the air force
- Commands: Tancos Air Base (1939); Portuguese Legion (1944); Air Base No. 4, on Terceira Island (1947); 3rd Military Region, in Tomar (1951)
- Battles/wars: First World War

Francisco Higino Craveiro Lopes (Note: Portuguese pronunciation: [fɾɐ̃ˈsiʃku iˈʒinu kɾɐˈvɐjɾu ˈlɔpɨʃ]) CvTE ComC GCA GCB (12 April 1894 – 2 September 1964) was a Portuguese Air Force officer and politician who served as the president of Portugal from 1951 to 1958.

== Early life and career ==
Born in Lisbon, he was a son of João Carlos Craveiro Lopes, Portuguese army general and governor-general of Portuguese India (1929–1936), and his wife Júlia Clotilde Cristiano Salinas.

He concluded his Colégio Militar studies by 1911, having then entered the Escola Politécnica de Lisboa, in the same year he joined a cavalry regiment. He succeeded his father as the 123rd General Governor of Portuguese India (1936–1938).

Lopes served as the commander of the Portuguese volunteer forces during the Spanish Civil War.

== Presidency ==
Prime Minister António de Oliveira Salazar chose Craveiro Lopes as the regime's presidential candidate in 1951 to succeed the late Óscar Carmona. Initially, he was to run in what would have been only the second contested election of the Estado Novo, when naval officer Manuel Quintão Meireles filed to run against him. However, Quintão Meireles withdrew before election day, and Craveiro Lopes was elected unopposed.

Under the Constitution, the president was vested with near-dictatorial powers. In practice, Carmona had mostly turned over the government to Salazar. However, Craveiro Lopes was not willing to give Salazar the free hand that Carmona had given him. Despite this, he did not go as far as to dismiss Salazar; for all intents and purposes, the president's power to sack the prime minister was the only check on Salazar's power.

Nevertheless, Salazar picked the seemingly more pliant naval minister, Américo Tomás, as the regime's candidate in 1958. The Democratic Opposition then invited Craveiro Lopes to be their candidate, but he knew he stood no chance of winning and refused. The regime, however, as compensation promoted him to Marshal. He was involved in the failed military attempt to overthrow Salazar in 1961, led by the Defence Minister Júlio Botelho Moniz.

He died in Lisbon on 2 September 1964.

== State visits ==
- List of international presidential trips made by Francisco Craveiro Lopes

== National honours ==
Craveiro received the following national honours:

- Portugal:
- Sash of the Three Orders
- Grand Cross of the Military Order of Aviz
- Grand Officer of the Military Order of Aviz
- Officer of the Military Order of Aviz
- Commander of the Order of Christ
- Knight of the Order of the Tower and Sword
- Victory Medal
- Exemplary Behavior Medal
- Medal of Military Merit
- Military Medal of the War Cross (1^{st} Class) (MPCG) (Note: Portuguese: Medalha Militar da Cruz de Guerra – 1.ª Classe – In the center, a miniature war cross, surrounded by two branches of laurel, all in gold) (Portugal)

== Foreign honours ==
Craveiro received the following foreign honours:

- Brazil:
  - Grand Collar of the Order of the Southern Cross (27 March 1952)
  - Grand Cross of the Order of Military Merit (16 March 1956)
  - Grand Cross of the Order of Naval Merit (13 August 1955)
  - Grand Cross of the Order of Aeronautical Merit (16 March 1956)
- Dominican Republic: Grand Cross of the Order of Merit of Duarte, Sánchez and Mella (20 November 1957)
- France: Grand Cross of the National Order of Legion of Honour (8 August 1953)
- (Kingdom of Greece) Greece: Grand Cross of the Order of the Redeemer (1 March 1955)
- Holy See: Grand Cross of the Order of the Holy Sepulchre of Jerusalem (11 August 1953)
- Lebanon: Grand Cross of the National Order of the Cedar (17 April 1956)
- Sovereign Military Order of Malta: Grand Cross of the Order pro Merito Melitensi (9 March 1954)
- Spain:
  - Grand Collar of the Imperial Order of the Yoke and Arrows (30 December 1953)
  - Grand Cross of the Order of Cisneros (14 June 1950)
- United Kingdom: Honorary Knight Grand Cross (Military Division) of the Most Honourable Order of the Bath (20 April 1956)

== Family ==
He married Berta Ribeiro Artur (Lisbon, Pena, 15 October 1899 – Lisbon, Santa Maria de Belém, 5 July 1958), natural daughter of Engineer Sezinando Ribeiro Artur (Lisbon, 1875 – Lourenço Marques, 1918) by Maria Clara Pereira, by whom he had four children.

== Notes ==
Political offices
Preceded by Óscar Carmona	President of Portugal; 1951–1958	Succeeded by Américo Tomás
