= Fernando Santos Costa =

Fernando dos Santos Costa (19 December 1899 - 15 October 1982) was an officer of the Portuguese Army, who was a member of the Government of Salazar, from 1936 to 1958.

In the Government, he held the offices of Under-Secretary of State of War (1936-1944), Minister of War (1944-1950) and Minister of National Defense (1950-1958).

== Early career ==
Santos Costa and Salazar met at the University of Coimbra in 1917, where they were both members of a Catholic student organisation, the Academic Centre for Christian Democracy. Santos Costa went on to join the Army and, as a second-lieutenant, took part in the Monarchy of the North, an abortive royalist uprising against the Portuguese Republic in 1919.

Still later, he was involved in the 1926 coup, that by degrees turned Portugal into an entrenched right-wing dictatorship. The decisive moment came in 1928 with the appointment of Salazar as Minister of Finance. Salazar went on to become Prime Minister in 1932 and established a Benito Mussolini-style corporate state, governed by 'non-party' specialists. One such specialist was Santos Costa, who became Under-Secretary of State (deputy Minister) of War in 1936, even though he still only held the junior rank of captain in the Army.

Santos Costa was set to become one of the leading figures of the New State, the style adopted by the Salazar dictatorship, responsible for the reforms intended to improve the fighting efficiency of the Army. After the outbreak of the Second World War in 1939, he was also strongly associated with the faction in both the State and Army that desired a German victory, even though this went against the good relations that Portugal traditionally enjoyed with England. Although far more right-wing than Salazar himself, and something of a dangerous political maverick, he was finally appointed full Minister of War in 1944, because of his skill in ensuring that the Army remained an effective prop for the dictatorship.

== Post-war career ==
After the War, Santos Costa was among the more reactionary members of the government, resisting all attempts at liberalisation. Following the death in 1951 of General Carmona, the head of state, he supported the restoration of Monarchy, along with the monarchist wing of the New State. Most of the regimen leaders disagreed. Salazar seeing no advantages in the return of the Monarchy, also supported the keeping of the elective President of the Republic.

In August 1958, in a surprise move by Salazar, Santos Costa was finally dropped from the government, along with Marcelo Caetano, from the more liberal wing of the New State apparatus. Nevertheless, he remained politically active, supporting his old boss at one moment, only to plot against him at the next. His ambitions to replace Salazar as premier were well-known, causing one member of the opposition to remark "If it is inevitable that we are going to have Santos Costa, we shall say mass every morning that the good Lord preserve Salazar."
