= Military Order of Aviz =

Portuguese honorific order established in 1146

Military Order of Aviz Ordem Militar de Avis
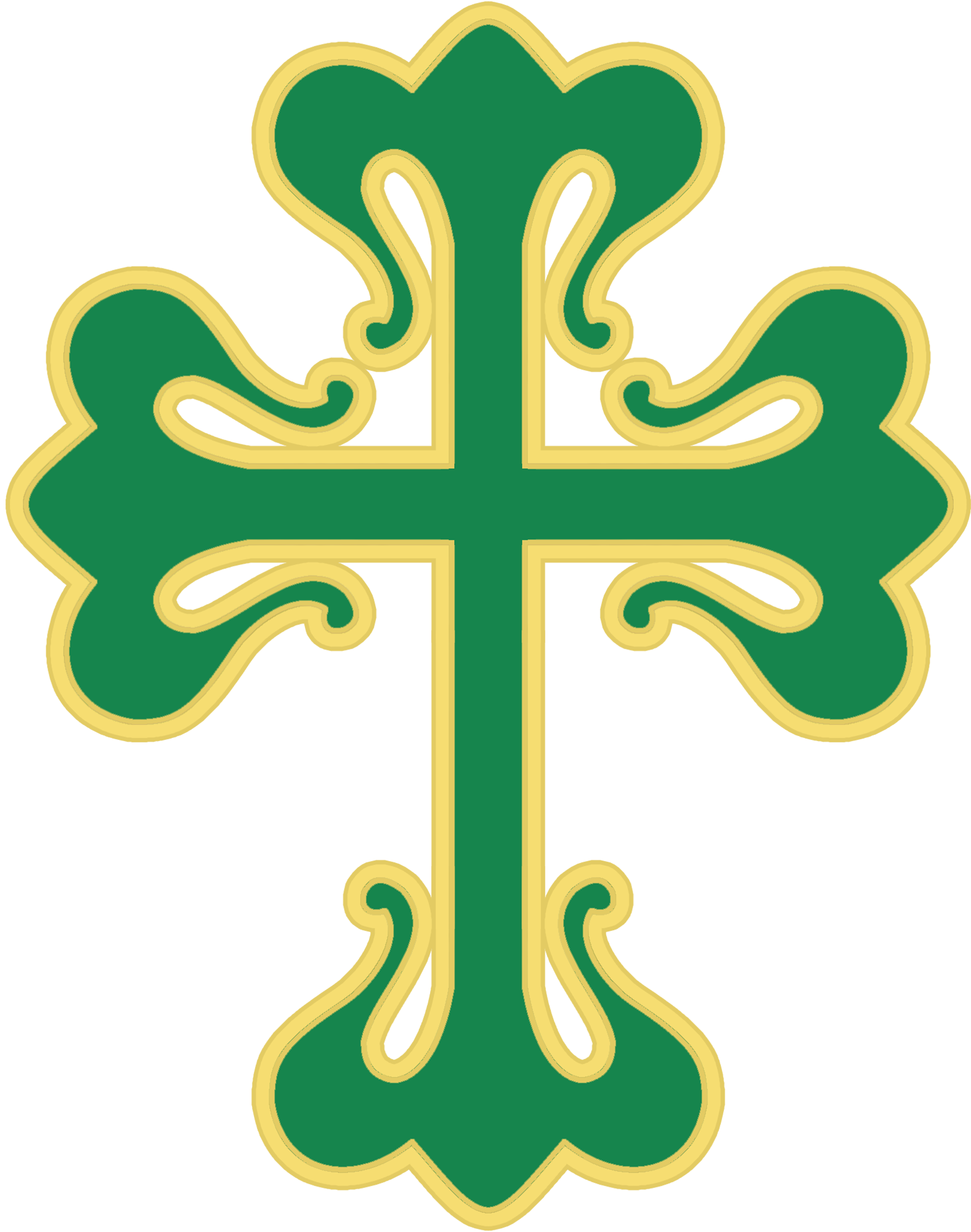
- Emblem of the Order

Awarded by the president of Portugal
- Type: Ancient military order
- Established: 1146 (founded); 1789 (secularized)
- Country: Portugal
- Ribbon: Green
- Motto: Pax (Peace)
- Eligibility: Officials of the military and National Republican Guard with at least 7 years serving as an official, foreign military dignitaries
- Criteria: "Demonstrated, throughout the military career, high moral and professional attributes, expressed through irreproachable conduct, recognized civic qualities, and military virtues; Have rendered highly meritorious, notably relevant and distinguished services that have contributed to the military prestige of the Armed Forces or the National Republican Guard, with particular emphasis on services rendered in campaign or involving life-threatening risk".
- Status: Active
- Founder: Afonso Henriques
- Grand Master: President of Portugal
- Chancellor: Guilherme d'Oliveira Martins
- Grades: Grand Collar (GColA); Grand Cross (GCA); Grand Officer (GOA); Commander (ComA); Officer (OA); Knight (CvA)/Dame (DmA)

Precedence
- Next (higher): Military Order of Christ
- Next (lower): Military Order of Saint James of the Sword
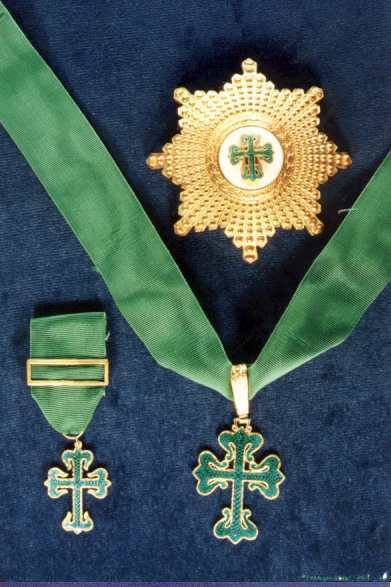
- Insignia of the Order Ribbon bar of the order

The Military Order of Aviz (Portuguese: Ordem Militar de Avis (Note: pronounced [ɐˈviʃ])), known previously to 1910 as the Royal Military Order of Saint Benedict of Aviz (Portuguese: Real Ordem Militar de São Bento de Avis), and before 1789 as the Knights of Saint Benedict of Aviz (Portuguese: Ordem de São Bento de Avis) or Friars of Santa Maria of Évora, is one of the four former ancient Portuguese military orders. It gave its name and coat of arms to the House of Aviz that ruled Portugal between 1385 and 1580. The founding king of House of Aviz, John I of Portugal, was an illegitimate son of a previous king, and thus not a member of his father's Portuguese House of Burgundy; however, John was the grand master of the Order of Aviz, and thus was known as "John of Aviz." Founded in 1146, it is the oldest Portuguese honorific order.

== History ==
=== Early history ===
The order, as a monastic military order, was founded in emulation of such military orders as the Knights Templar, which existed in Portugal as early as 1128, and received a grant from Theresa, Countess of Portugal in the year of the Council of Troyes, which confirmed their early statutes. A native order of this kind sprang up in Portugal about 1146. Afonso, the first king, gave to it the town of Évora, captured from the Moors in 1166, and the Knights were first called "Friars of Santa Maria of Évora". Gonçalo Viegas, was the first grand master.

After the conquest of Aviz a castle erected there became the motherhouse of the order, and they were then called "Knights of St. Benedict of Aviz", since they adopted the Benedictine rule in 1162, as modified by John Ziritu, one of the earliest Cistercian abbots of Portugal. Like the Knights of Calatrava in Castile, the Knights of Portugal were indebted to the Cistercians for their rule and their habit—a white mantle with a green fleur-de-lysed cross. The Knights of Calatrava also surrendered some of their places in Portugal to them on condition that the Knights of Aviz should be subject to the visitation of their grand master. Hence the Knights of Aviz were sometimes regarded as a branch of the Calatravan Order, although they never ceased to have a Portuguese grand master, dependent for temporalities on the Portuguese King.

At the death of King Ferdinand (1383) war broke out between Castile and Portugal. When João I, who had been grand master of the Knights of Aviz, ascended the throne of Portugal, he forbade the knights to submit to Castilian authority, and consequently, when Gonsalvo de Guzman came to Aviz as Visitor, the knights, while according him hospitality, refused to recognise him as a superior. Guzman protested, and the point remained a subject of contention until the Council of Basle (1431), when Portugal was declared to be in the wrong. But the right of the Calatravans was never exercised, and the next grand master of the Knights of Aviz, Fernando Rodrigues de Sequeira, continued to assert supreme authority over them.

The mission of the military orders in Portugal seemed to end after the overthrow of Muslim domination, but the Portuguese expeditions across the sea opened up a new field for them. The conquest of Ceuta by King João I (1415), the attacks upon Tangier under João's son Duarte (1437) were also crusades, inspired by a religious spirit and sanctioned by similar Papal Bulls. The Knights of Aviz and the Knights of Christ from Order of Christ, scions of the Knights Templars, achieved deeds of valour, the former under the Prince Fernando, the latter under Henrique, brother of King Duarte. Fernando displayed a no less heroic forbearance during his six years of captivity among the Muslims, a long martyrdom which after his death placed him among the Blessed (Acta SS.,5 June).

This enthusiasm did not last, and the Crusade in Africa continued as a mercantile enterprise. After the grand mastership of the order had been vested in the King in perpetuity (1551), he availed himself of its income to reward any kind of service in the army or the fleet. If the wealth of the Knights of Aviz was not as great as that of the Knights of Christ, it was still quite large, drawn as it was from some forty-three commanderies. The religious spirit of the knights vanished, and they withdrew from their clerical brothers who continued alone the conventual life. They were dispensed from their vow of celibacy by Alexander VI (1502), who tolerated their marriage to prevent scandalous concubinage; Julius III (1551) allowed them to dispose freely of their personal properties. Nobility of birth remained the chief requirement of aspirants to the mantle, a requirement confirmed by a decree of 1604.

=== Secularization of the order ===
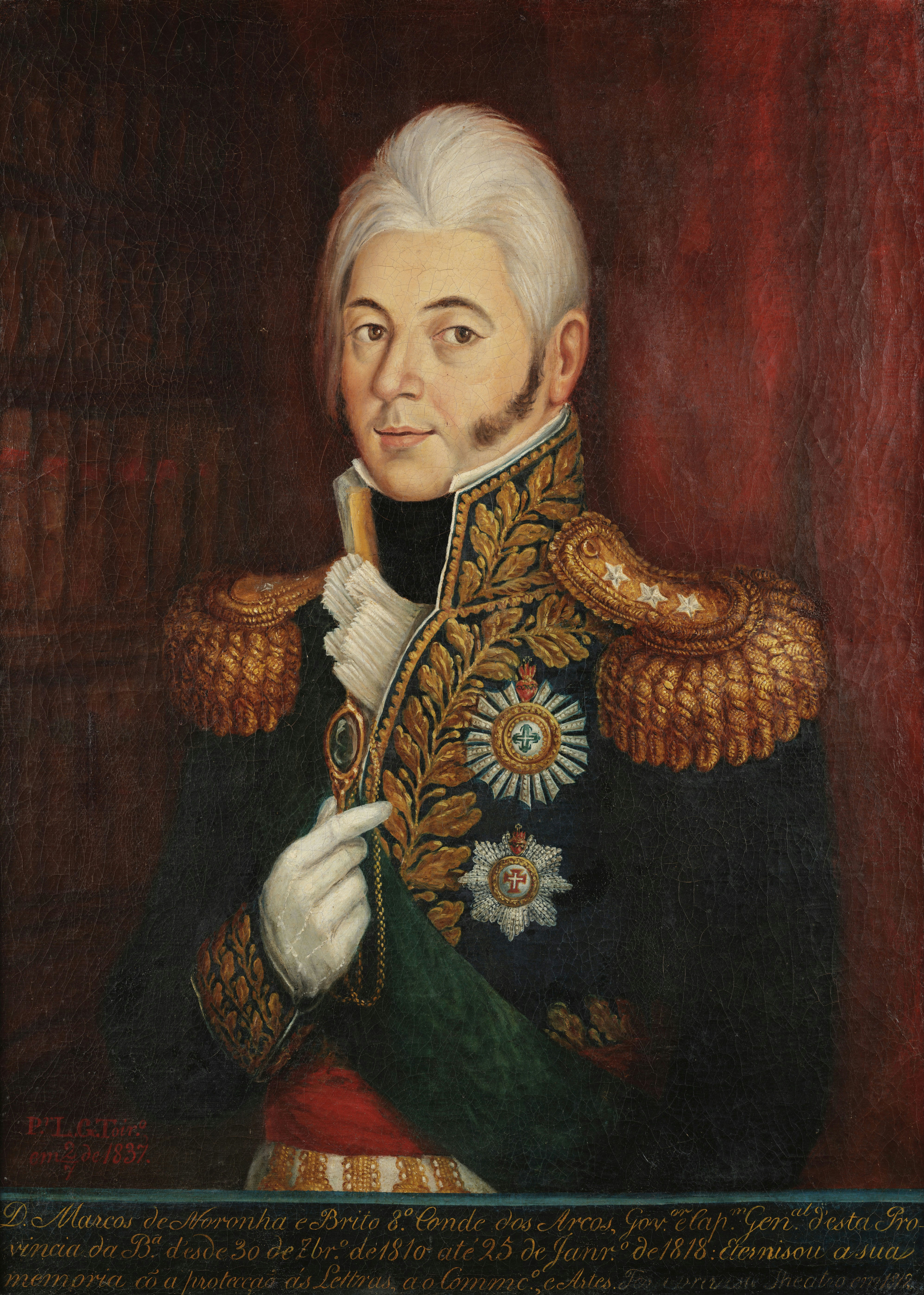
The Count of Arcos, last Viceroy of Brazil, wearing the Sash and Star of the Order of Aviz in an 1837 portrait

Pope Pius VI (1789) and Queen Mary I reformed the order into a secular institution. In 1834, when the civil government of Portugal abolished religious orders and monasteries, after the defeat of King Miguel in the Civil War, under the constitutional monarchy the order lost its properties. The ancient military orders were transformed by the liberal constitution and subsequent legislation into mere orders of merit. The privileges which once had been an essential part of the membership of the old military orders also ceased.

In 1910, when the Portuguese monarchy ended, the Republic of Portugal abolished all the orders except the Order of the Tower and Sword. However, in 1917, at the end of the Great War, some of these orders were re-established as mere orders of merit to reward outstanding services to the state, the office of grand master belonging to the head of state, the President of the Republic. The Military Order of Aviz, together with the other Portuguese Orders of Merit, had its statutes revised on several occasions, during the First Republic (1910–1926), then in 1962, and again in 1986.

The Military Order of Aviz, together with the Military Orders of Christ and of St. James of the Sword form the group of the "Ancient Military Orders", governed by a chancellor and a council of eight members, appointed by the President of the Republic, to assist him as grand master in all matters concerning the administration of the order. The order can only be conferred on military personnel, both Portuguese and foreign, for outstanding service. For Portuguese nationals, a minimum of seven years of service in the armed forces is required as well as an outstanding and exemplary service record. The regulations of the order suggest classes to be conferred according to military rank thus:

- Army captains and navy lieutenants: Knight
- Majors and lieutenant-commanders: Officer
- Lieutenant colonels and commanders: Commander
- Colonels, brigadiers, navy captains and rear admirals (US RADM, Commodore/US RDML being a virtually non-existing rank in the Portuguese Navy): Grand Officer
- Major generals, lieutenant generals, generals, vice-admirals and admirals: Grand Cross.

However, a number of further provisions in the regulations of the order allow for exceptions to this general rule.

== Grades ==
The Order of Aviz, as awarded by the Portuguese government today, comes in six classes:

- Grand Collar (GColA), outranking all previous, was introduced in 2021.
- Grand Cross (GCA), which wears the badge of the Order on a sash on the right shoulder, and the star of the Order in gold on the left chest;
- Grand Officer (GOA), which wears the badge of the Order on a necklet, and the star of the Order in gold on the left chest;
- Commander (ComA), which wears the badge of the Order on a necklet, and the star of the Order in silver on the left chest;
- Officer (OA), which wears the badge of the Order on a ribbon with rosette on the left chest;
- Knight (CvA) or Dame (DmA), which wears the badge of the Order on a plain ribbon on the left chest.

Ribbon Bars of the Military Order of Aviz
Grand Collar	Grand Cross	Grand Officer	Commander	Officer	Knight

== Insignia ==
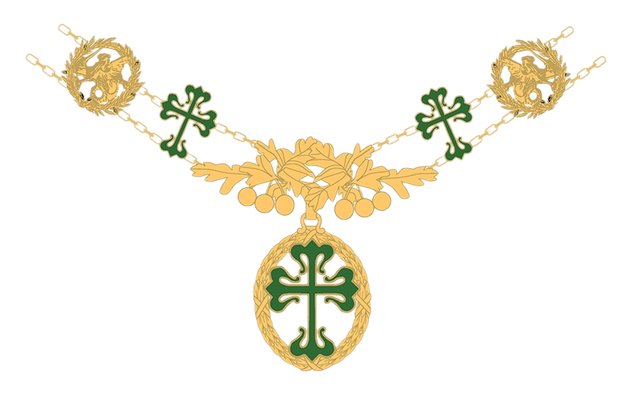
Grand collar of the order established in 2021

- The badge of the Order is a gilt cross with green enamel, similar to the Order's emblem illustrated here, but with a longer lower arm. During the monarchy the badge was topped by the Sacred Heart of Christ.
- The star of the Order is an eight-pointed, faceted star, in gilt for Grand Cross and Grand Officer, and in silver for Commander. The central disc is in white enamel, with a miniature of the modern badge in it. During the monarchy the Sacred Heart of Christ was placed at the top of the star.
- The ribbon of the Order is plain green.

== Selected recipients ==
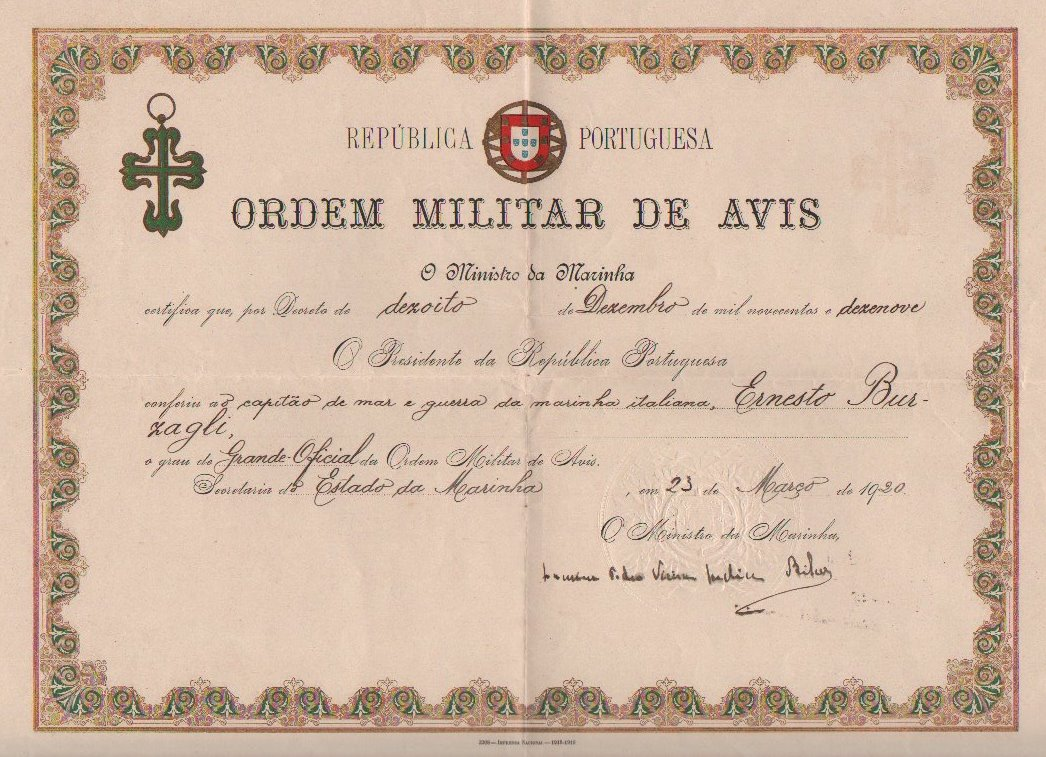
Certificate confirming that the Order of Aviz was conferred on Ernesto Burzagli by the President of the Portuguese Republic in 1920.

- Ernest Alexander (1870–1934), British army officer. Awarded grand officer.
- Amélie of Orléans (1865–1951), last Queen of Portugal. Presented by her son in mid-1909, for her heroism during assassination of her husband the King in 1908.
- Albert du Roy de Blicquy (1869–1940), Belgian general.
- David Legge Brainard (1856–1946), US Arctic explorer and US Army officer.
- John Brind (1878–1954), British army officer. Awarded by 1929.
- Ernesto Burzagli (1873–1944), Italian admiral. Awarded grand officer in 1920.
- Richard E. Byrd (1888–1957), US polar explorer and aviator.
- Humberto de Alencar Castelo Branco (1897–1967), military officer and president of Brazil. Awarded grand officer in 1945.
- Charles III of the United Kingdom (then Charles, Prince of Wales) (b. 1948). Awarded grand cross, awarded 1993.
- Victor Hugo de Azevedo Coutinho (1871–1955), naval officer and prime minister of Portugal.
- Francisco Craveiro Lopes (1894–1964), air force officer and president of Portugal. Awarded officer, grand officer, and grand cross.
- António Ramalho Eanes (b. 1935), Portuguese general. Awarded first grand collar, 2025.
- Mateo García de los Reyes (1872–1936), Spanish Navy officer
- Guillaume, Grand Duke of Luxembourg (then hereditary grand duke) (b. 1981). Awarded grand cross, 2017.
- Hesketh Hesketh-Prichard (1876–1922), British army officer. Awarded Commander of the Military Order.
- Roberto Ivens (1850–1898), Portuguese explorer. Awarded 1895.
- Richard H. Jackson (1866–1971), US Navy admiral. Awarded grand officer.
- James L. Jones (b. 1943), US Marine Corps general. Awarded grand cross, 2006.
- 1st Earl Mountbatten of Burma (1900–1979), British naval officer. Knight grand cross, awarded 1951.
- John William McNee (1887–1984), British pathologist.
- Sven Thofelt (1904–1993), Swedish military officer and Olympian. Awarded commander class.
- Brudenell White (1876–1940), Australian general. Awarded as a grand officer.
- James Yeo (1782–1818), Royal Navy, 1809.

== See also ==
- Honorific orders of Portugal
- Order of Aviz (Brazil)
