= 140th Regiment =

140th Regiment may refer to:

- 140th Aviation Regiment, United States
- 140th (5th London) Field Regiment, Royal Artillery
- 140th Infantry Regiment (United States)
- 140th Separate Special Purpose Regiment, Ukraine

== American Civil War regiments ==
- 140th Illinois Infantry Regiment
- 140th Indiana Infantry Regiment
- 140th New York Infantry Regiment
- 140th Ohio Infantry Regiment
- 140th Pennsylvania Infantry Regiment

== See also ==
- 140th Brigade (disambiguation)
- 140th Division (disambiguation)
- 140th (disambiguation)
