= José António Marques =

José António Marques MPVM CvC ComA MPBS MPCE CvNSC
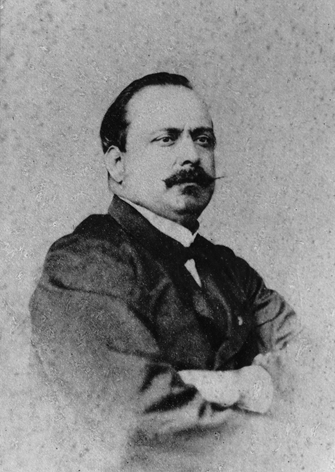
- Born: January 29, 1822; Lisbon, Portugal
- Died: 8 November 1884 (aged 62); Lisbon, Portugal
- Occupations: Military, journalist, physician
- Known for: Founder of the Portuguese Red Cross

José António Marques MPVM CvC ComA MPBS MPCE CvNSC (29 January 1822 – 8 November 1884) was the founder of the Portuguese Red Cross.

== Biography ==
José António Marques was the son of António Emídio Marques and Catarina da Assunção Marques. At 20, he finished his studies in medicine at the Escola Médico-Cirúrgica de Lisboa (Medicine and Surgery College of Lisbon). In 1842, by a decree of August of the same year, he was nominated assistant-surgeon and assigned to the 3rd Chasseur Battalion (Batalhão de Caçadores n.º 3). He rose through several levels of the military, being, in 1851, promoted to the position of Squad Surgeon.

He distinguished himself, not only in his military life, where he played important roles on the Repartição de Saúde do Estado Maior General on the War Ministry, but equally as a journalist, having been one of the collaborators of a highly scientific publication, O Jornal dos Facultativos Militares. Escholiaste Médico, and on his civilian medical career.

He was the author of countless scientific works. His memoir, Aperçu historique de l'ophtalmie militaire portugaise, presented, in 1857, in the ophthalmology congress in Brussels, granted him the titles of Doctor of Medicine and Doctor of Surgery from the University of Brussels.

He represented Portugal in several congresses of ophthalmology.

In August 1864, by nomination of King Luis I, he represented Portugal at the International Conference in Geneva, to discuss the neutralization, in times of war, "of ambulances and hospitals, as well as healthcare personnel, rescuers and wounded people".

Portugal, through Marques, was one of the twelve countries that signed the First Geneva Convention on 22 August 1864, destined to give a better chance to military staff wounded in battle.

Back in Portugal, Marques organized, on 11 February 1865, the "Comissão Portuguesa de Socorros a Feridos e Doentes Militares em Tempo de Guerra", the former designation of the Portuguese Red Cross.

For his services to the country and the Army, several decorations were awarded to this famous medician, founder and 1st Secretary-General of the Portuguese Red Cross, including that of Commander of the Order of Aviz, Knight of the Order of Christ and of the Order of the Immaculate Conception of Vila Viçosa, and Knight of the Orders of Leopold I of Belgium and of Charles III of Spain.

== Distinctions ==
=== National orders ===
- Military Valor Medal (Silver) (MPVM) (Note: Portuguese: Medalha de Valor Militar – Grau Prata – At the center of the ribbon, a national shield is placed, resting on a golden armillary sphere.) (Portugal)
- Knight of the Military Order of Christ
- Commander of the Military Order of Aviz
- Knight of the Order of the Immaculate Conception of Vila Viçosa
- Good Service Medal, Silver
- Exemplary Behaviour Medal, Silver

=== Foreign honors ===
- Knight of the Order of Leopold (Belgium)
- Officer of the Order of the Crown of Italy (Italy)
