= 1st Sustainment Brigade =

Formation of the US Army

1st Infantry Division Sustainment Brigade
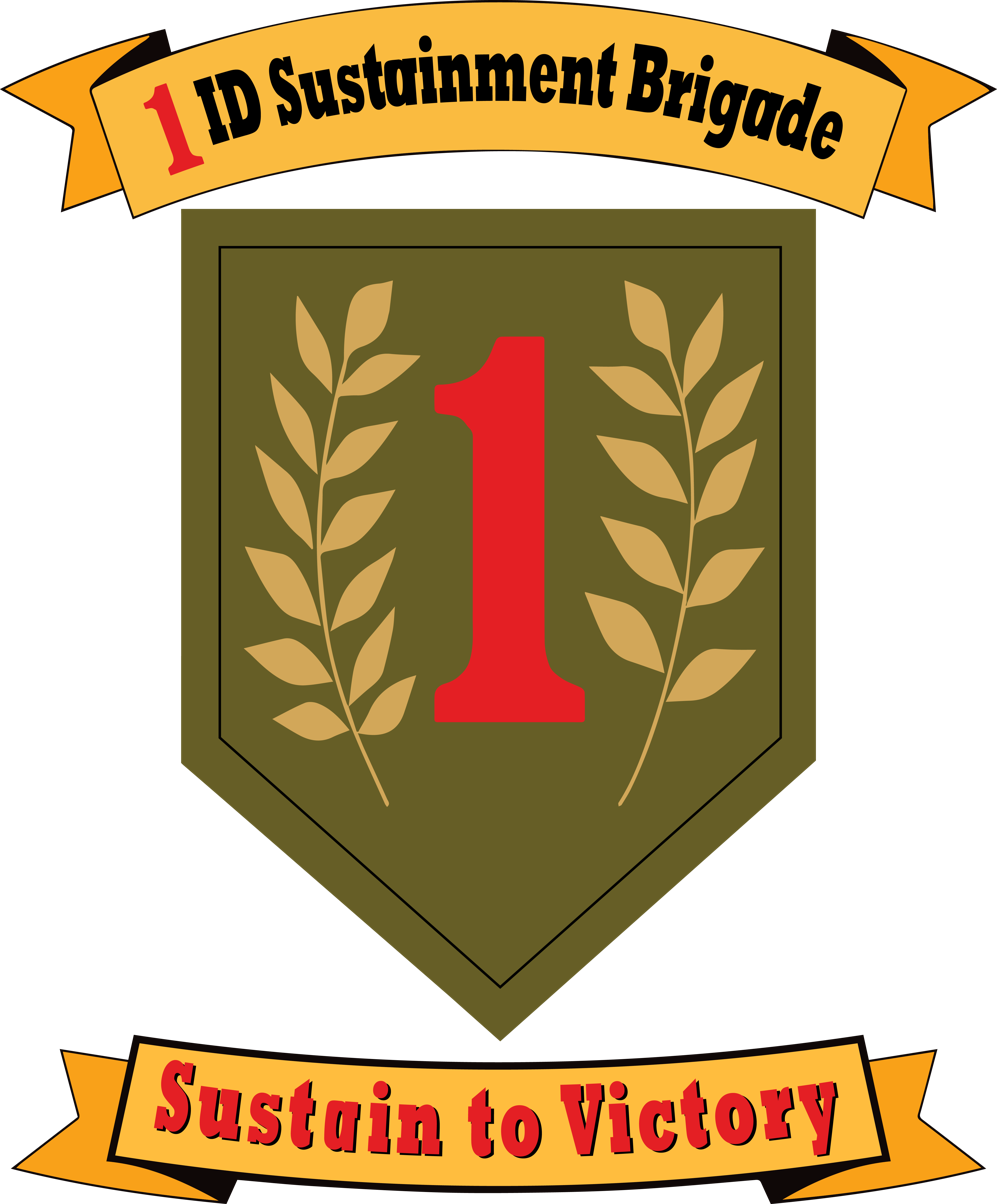
- The 1st Infantry Division Sustainment Brigade's combat service identification badge (CSIB)
- Active: 15 February 2007 – present
- Country: United States
- Branch: United States Army
- Type: Sustainment Brigade
- Size: Brigade
- Part of: 1st Infantry Division
- Garrison/HQ: Fort Riley, Kansas
- Motto: Sustain to Victory

Commanders
- Current commander: COL Charles Montgomery

Insignia
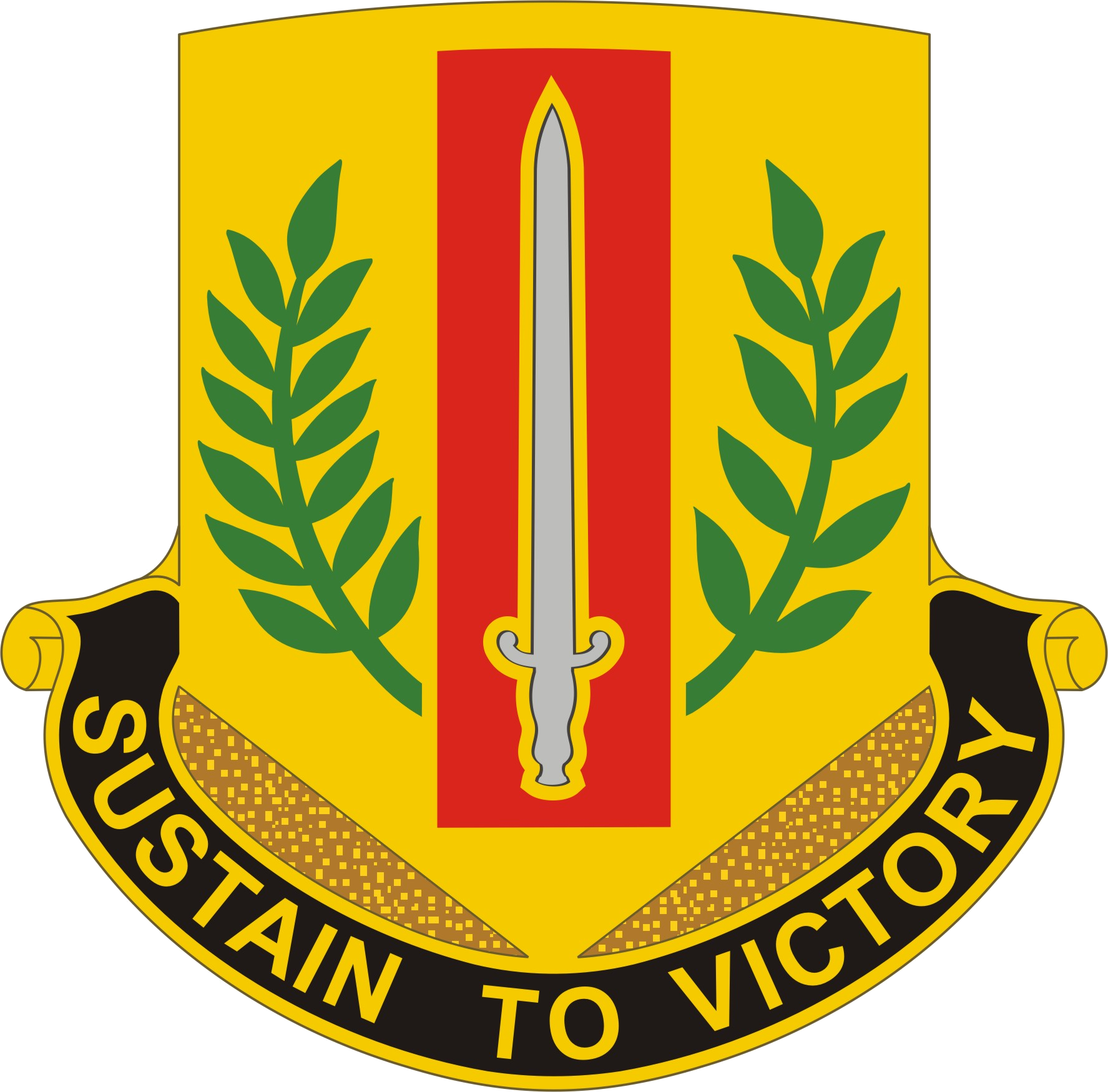
- Distinctive Unit Insignia

- 1st Sustainment Brigade former SSI

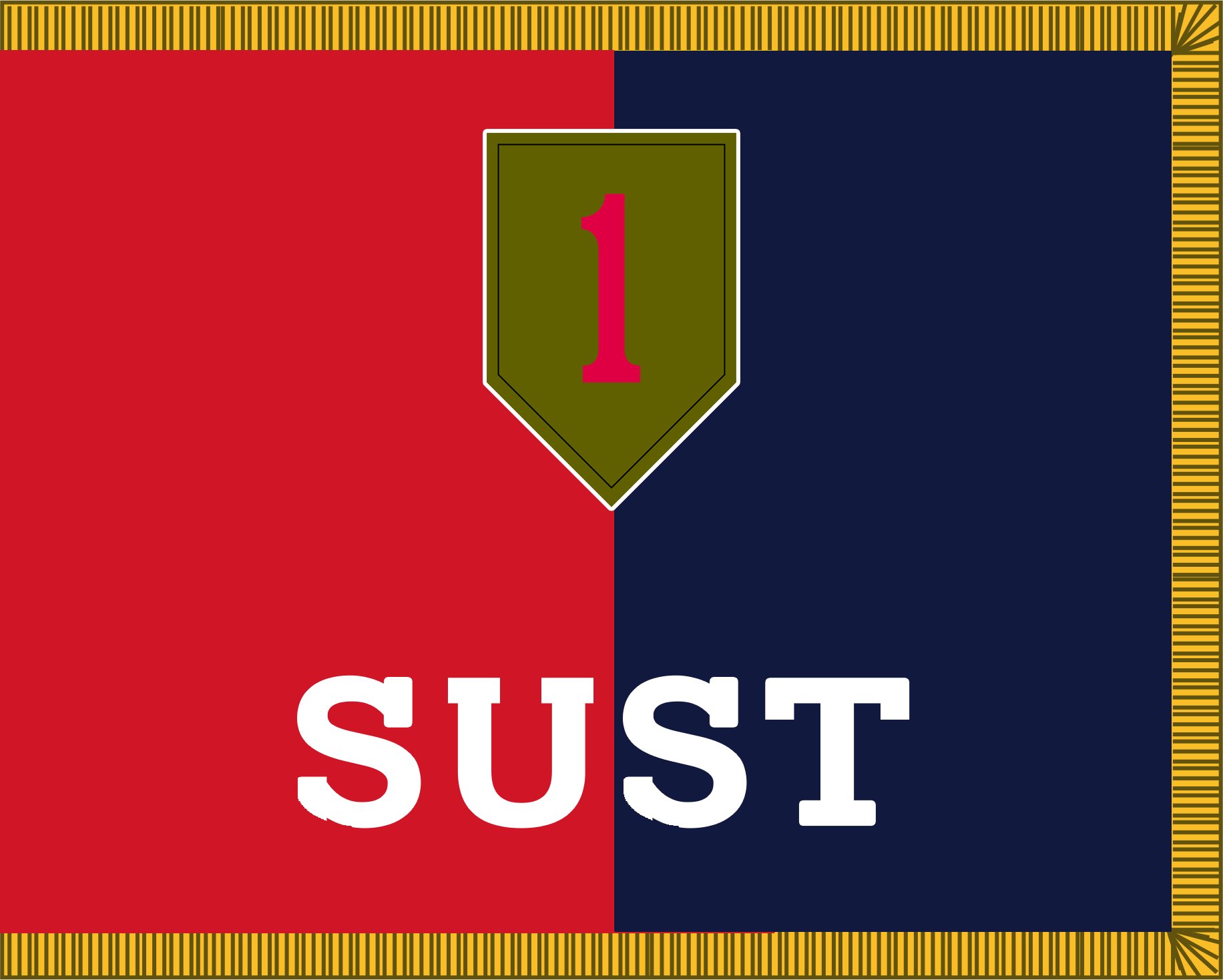
- 1st Division Sustainment Brigade Flag

The 1st Infantry Division Sustainment Brigade is a sustainment brigade of the United States Army based at Fort Riley, Kansas. It provides logistics support to the 1st Infantry Division.

Activated in 2007, the unit is a modular brigade capable of a variety of actions. Though assigned to the 1st Infantry Division on a permanent basis, it is capable of independent operations and taking on subordinate units to fulfill large scale sustainment operations for the United States Army.

Formed from the Division Support Command of the 1st Infantry Division, the brigade carries the lineage and honors of the division dating back to World War I campaigns as early as 1917. Having also seen action in World War II, the Vietnam War, and the Gulf War, the brigade has numerous awards and decorations from its previous designation. The brigade has also seen three tours in Iraq in support of Operation Iraqi Freedom.

== Organization ==
The 1st Infantry Division Sustainment Brigade (1ID SB) in garrison at Fort Riley is composed of two subordinate battalions.

The 1st Special Troops Battalion (STB) contains:

- Headquarters and Headquarters Company (HHC)
- 267th Signal Company
- 258th Human Resources Company
- 9th Financial Management Support Unit
- 511th Field Feeding Company

The 541st Division Sustainment Support Battalion (DSSB) provides logistics support to the 1st Infantry Division and area support to units that are echelons above brigade. The 541st DSSB has seven subordinate companies:

- Headquarters and Headquarters Company
- 1st Support Maintenance Company
- 526th Composite Supply Company
- 24th Composite Truck Company
- 266th Movement Control Team

== History ==
=== Origins ===
The 1st Infantry Division Support Command (DISCOM) traces its origins to World War I, where in 1917, the Division Trains were formed to support the newly formed 1st Infantry Division. In 1921, the Division trains were consolidated into the Special Troops, 1st Infantry Division. After World War I, the Special Troops deployed to Fort Riley, Kansas. Three of the DISCOM's former subordinate battalions, the 101st Forward Support Battalion (FSB) and 201st Forward Support Battalions, and the 701st Main Support Battalion, served in World War I, but with different divisions.

These units deployed back to Germany to support the 1st Infantry Division during World War II, and participated in all eight campaigns credited to the 1st Infantry Division. In 1955, the Division and its support organizations returned to Fort Riley, Kansas.

In 1965, the division deployed to South Vietnam, as a part of the Vietnam War buildup. DISCOM units supported the Division in all of the eleven campaigns it participated in while deployed to South Vietnam.

After Vietnam, the DISCOM underwent many changes. The Division Material Management Center (DMMC) was established, and the Finance and Personnel Services Companies (PSC) were reorganized into battalion commands. In 1990, the DISCOM deployed again, this time to Southwest Asia in support of Operation Desert Storm.

In 1996, the DISCOM, deployed to Europe for a third time and consisted of the 101st FSB at Fort Riley, Kansas, the 201st FSB in Vilseck, Germany, the 701st MSB in Kitzingen, Germany, the 601st Aviation Support Battalion(ASB) in Katterbach, Germany, and the Headquarters and Headquarters Company (HHC), also in Kitzingen.

=== Global War on Terrorism ===
In 2003, the DISCOM was deployed to Turkey in support of Operation Iraqi Freedom I. The DISCOM simultaneously supported peacekeeping operations in the Balkans and deployed a logistics task force to support Operation Iraqi Freedom I throughout Iraq. In 2004, the DISCOM redeployed to Southwest Asia in Support of Operation Iraqi Freedom II. In addition to the organic DISCOM units, the 225th Forward Support Battalion from Hawaii and the 230th Support Battalion from North Carolina deployed to support logistical operations for Task Force Danger. Finally, in 2005, the DISCOM redeployed to Germany to reconstitute and prepare for future contingency operations. The DISCOM was awarded the Meritorious Unit Commendation for its contributions during Operation Iraqi freedom II.

As of January 2006, the DISCOM consisted of the 201st Field Support Battalion in Vilseck, Germany, the 701st Maneuver Support Battalion in Kitzingen, Germany, the 299th Field Support Battalion in Schweinfurt Germany, the 601st Aviation Support Battalion in Katterbach, Germany, and the Headquarters and Headquarters Company (HHC), also in Kitzingen. Over the months between January 2006 and July 2006 the 601st returned to Fort Riley, the 701st was inactivated, the 299th was task organized to the 2nd Brigade Combat Team in preparation for another deployment to Operation Iraqi Freedom, and the 201st was task organized under the 3rd Brigade Combat Team and later deactivated. The DISCOM HHC was re-deployed to Fort Riley Kansas in August 2006 to build the 1st Sustainment Brigade.

For a brief period, the DISCOM gained administrative control over the 97th Military Police Battalion, the 541st CSSB, the Band, and the 101st Military Intelligence Battalion. The 101st was in-activated in December 2006, the 541st and 97th were deployed and task organized away from the DISCOM.

In November 2006, the brigade reviewed its own Shoulder Sleeve Insignia (SSI) and Distinctive Unit Insignia. These items were based heavily on the SSI of the 1st Infantry Division. Later that month, the brigade was informed that it would be deployed to Iraq again in 2007.

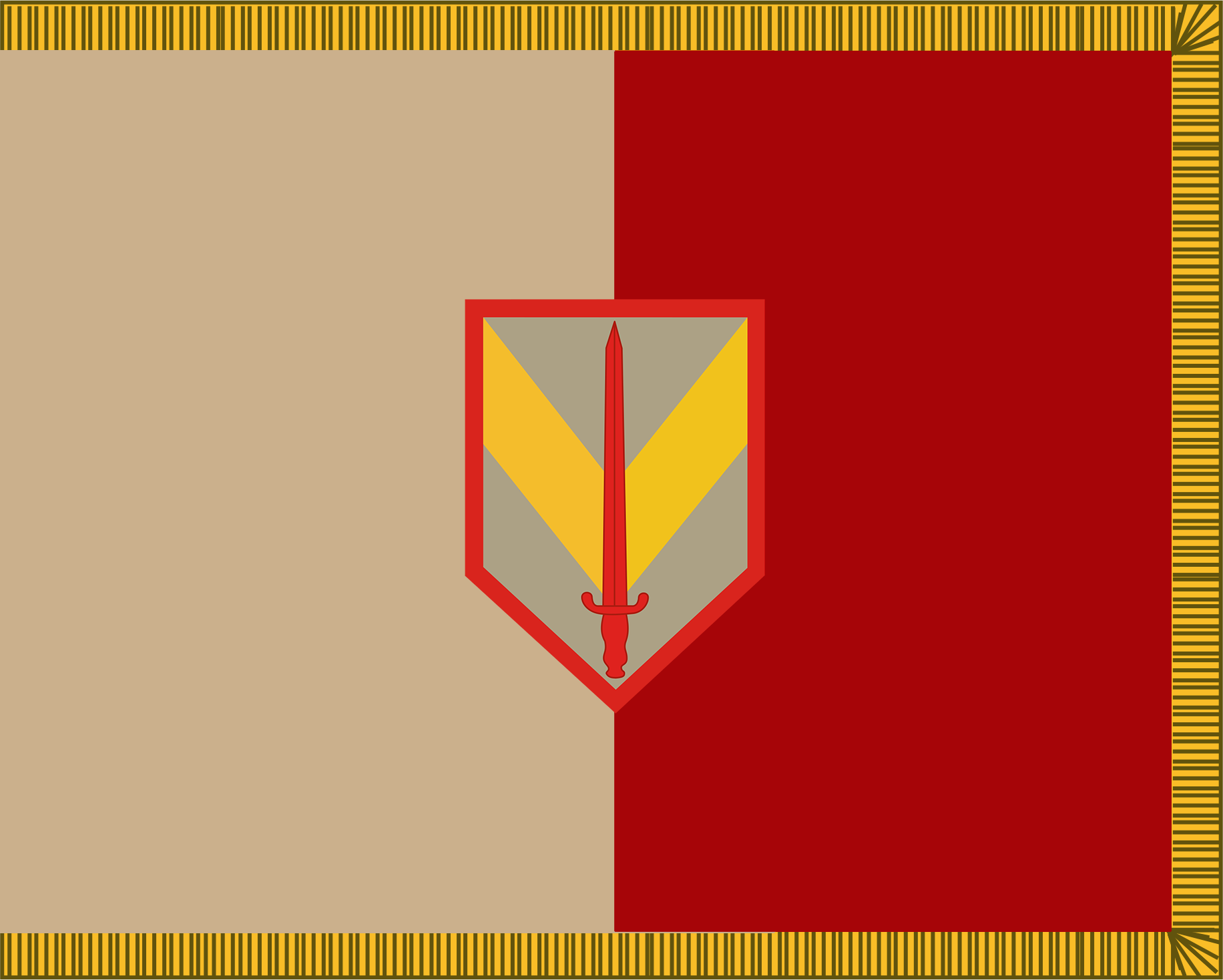
1st Sustainment Brigade Flag

The 1st Sustainment Brigade (SB) was activated on 15 February 2007 at 10:00 am local time at Fort Riley, Kansas. It is a scalable tailorable Sustainment Brigade, with a mission statement of: Plans, synchronizes, monitors, and executes distribution operations. Conducts sustainment operations within assigned area of operation. Conducts Theater Opening and/or Theater Distribution operations when directed. Provides support to joint, interagency, and multinational forces as directed.

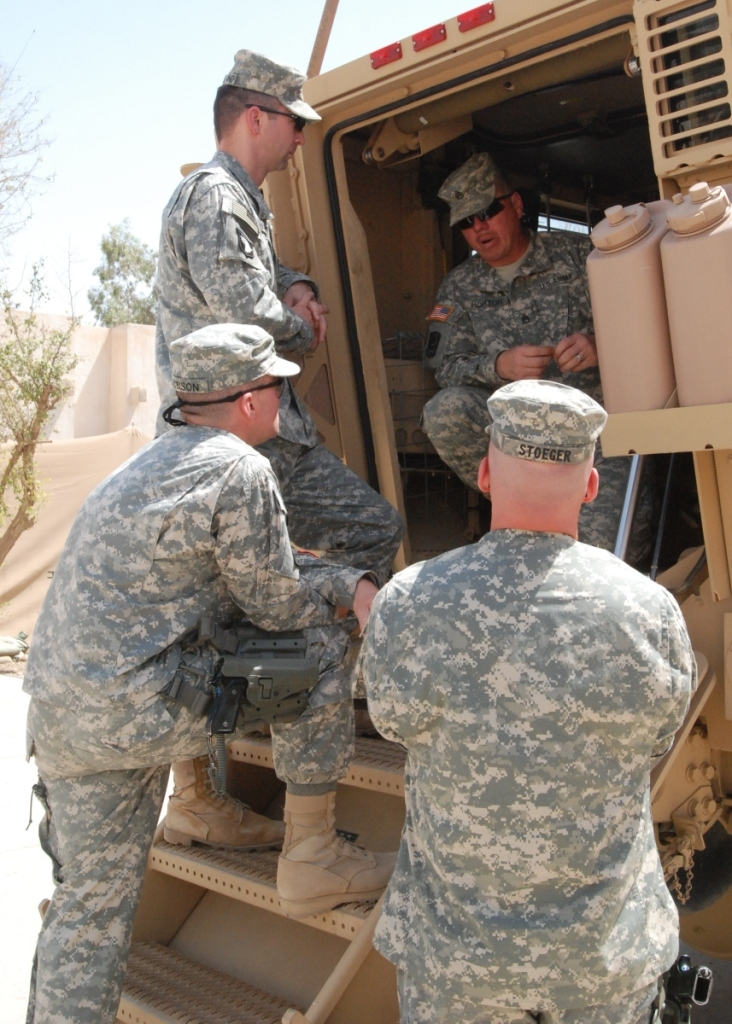
A 1st Sustainment Brigade soldier briefs 10th Sustainment Brigade soldiers on the MRAP in Iraq.

The brigade deployed to Iraq again in late 2007, operating in the areas such as those around Central Iraq. The brigade's headquarters during this time has been Camp Taji. The brigade made history on 16 June 2008 when it heralded the return of the battlefield promotion system in the US Army. The system, which was previously discontinued, was part of a pilot program that the Army was looking at to bring battlefield promotions back.

Soldiers of the brigade were also some of the first to use the MRAP, or Mine Resistant Ambush Protected vehicle. The soldiers used the vehicles to train other soldiers on use of the vehicle, particularly leaders of the 10th Sustainment Brigade, which replaced the 1st Sustainment Brigade in late 2008.

From October 2012 to September 2013 the 1ID Sustainment Brigade deployed to Bagram, Afghanistan in support of Operation Enduring Freedom. This was the brigade's first deployment to Afghanistan. They deployed to Afghanistan again in February 2019 in support of Operation Freedom Sentinel and Resolute Support under the title 1ID Resolute Support Sustainment Brigade.

The 1st Infantry Division Sustainment Brigade provides a full spectrum support including: configuring for, distributions and retrogrades to and from maneuver Brigade Combat Teams, other support brigades, and to joint interagency and multinational elements as directed. The 1st SB supports Early Entry Operations or Hub operations with augmentation, providing postal, replacement, and casualty operations as well as essential personnel services and Trial Defense Services on an area basis. The brigade is assigned as the sustainment unit of the 1st Infantry Division, however it can also operate independently, being assigned other units and other missions independent of the division.

== Honors ==
As it was a part of the 1st Infantry Division's command, the brigade received campaign participation credit and awards for all of the same conflicts as the Division Headquarters up until it became an independent unit in 2006. Thereafter, it retained separate lineage.

=== Unit Decorations ===
Ribbon	Award	Year	Notes
	Meritorious Unit Commendation (Army)	1968	for service in Vietnam
	Meritorious Unit Commendation (Army)	1991	for service in Southeast Asia
	Meritorious Unit Commendation (Army)	2004–2005	for service in Operation Iraqi Freedom
	Meritorious Unit Commendation (Army)	2007–2009	For service in Iraq
	Meritorious Unit Commendation (Army)	2012-2013	For service in Afghanistan
	French Croix de guerre, World War II (With Palm)	1943	For service in Kasserine
	French Croix de guerre, World War II (With Palm)	1944	For service in Normandy
	French Croix de guerre, World War II (With Palm)	1945	For service in Fourragère
	Belgian Fourragere	1940	For service in Belgium
	Cited in the Order of the Day	1944	For service in Mons
	Cited in the Order of the Day	1944	For service in Eupen–Malmedy
	Republic of Vietnam Cross of Gallantry, with Palm	1965–1968	For service in Vietnam
	Republic of Vietnam Civil Action Honor Medal, First Class	1965–1970	For service in Vietnam

=== Campaign streamers ===
Conflict	Streamer	Year(s)
World War I	Montdidier–Noyon	1917
World War I	Aisne–Marne	1917
World War I	St. Mihiel	1917
World War I	Meuse-Argonne	1917
World War I	Lorraine	1917
World War I	Lorraine	1918
World War I	Picardy	1918
World War II	Algeria–French Morocco (With Arrowhead)	1944–1945
World War II	Tunisia	1942
World War II	Sicily (With Arrowhead)	1943
World War II	Normandy (With Arrowhead)	1944
World War II	Northern France	1944–1945
World War II	Rhineland Campaign	1944–1945
World War II	Ardennes-Alsace Campaign	1944–1945
World War II	Central Europe Campaign	1945
Vietnam War	Vietnam Defense	1965
Vietnam War	Counteroffensive, Phase I	1965–1966
Vietnam War	Counteroffensive, Phase II	1966–1967
Vietnam War	Counteroffensive, Phase III	1967–1968
Vietnam War	Tet Counteroffensive	1968
Vietnam War	Counteroffensive, Phase IV	1968
Vietnam War	Counteroffensive, Phase V	1968
Vietnam War	Counteroffensive, Phase VI	1968–1969
Vietnam War	Tet 69/Counteroffensive	1969
Vietnam War	Summer–Fall 1969	1969
Vietnam War	Winter–Spring 1970	1970
Gulf War	Defense of Saudi Arabia	1990–1991
Gulf War	Liberation and Defense of Kuwait	1990–1991
Gulf War	Cease-Fire	1990–1991
Iraq War	Operation Iraqi Freedom I	2003
Iraq War	Operation Iraqi Freedom II	2004–2005
Iraq War	Operation Iraqi Freedom V	2007–2008
Iraq War	Operation New Dawn	2010–2011
War in Afghanistan	Transition I	2012–2013
