= 140th Military Intelligence Battalion (United States) =

140th Military Intelligence Battalion (Combat Electronic Warfare Intelligence) (Heavy Division)
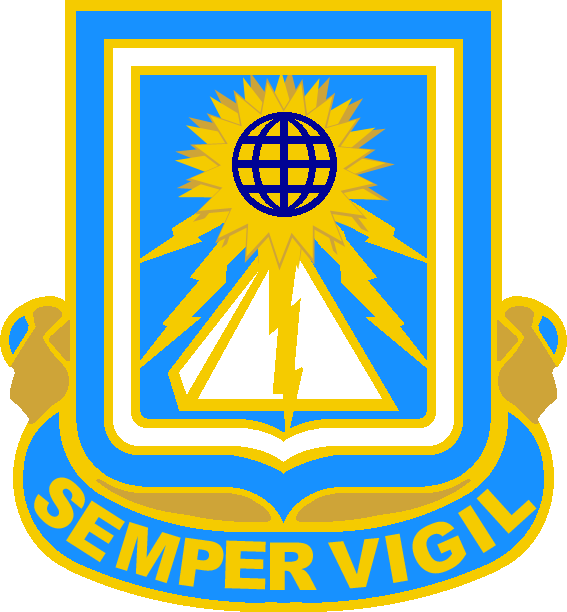
- 140th Military Intelligence Battalion distinctive unit insignia
- Active: 1986–1995
- Disbanded: 1995
- Country: United States
- Branch: United States Army Reserve
- Type: Military intelligence
- Role: Combat Electronic Warfare Intelligence, Heavy Division type
- Size: 400 +/-
- Garrison/HQ: Patton USAR Center, Bell, California; Dessiderio USAR Ctr., Pasadena
- Motto: Semper Vigil (always watchful)
- Mascots: Fred, the exterminator cat (1990)
- Engagements: none
- Decorations: none
- Battle honours: none

The 140th Military Intelligence Battalion (Combat Electronic Warfare Intelligence) (Heavy Division) of the United States Army Reserve was constituted on 16 July 1986, assigned to the 63rd Army Reserve Command ("Blood and Fire"), and activated with headquarters at the General George Smith Patton Jr. United States Army Reserve Center, located at 5340 Bandini Boulevard in Bell, California. The battalion inactivated in 1995.

The battalion's full-time property book officer and supply sergeants were recognized as having the best-run unit supply operation of any battalion in the Army Reserve in both 1991 and 1992.

The 140th MI Battalion's activation was essentially simultaneous with the inactivation of the 309th Army Security Agency Battalion. The personnel and facilities of the 309th were initially transferred to the 140th at that time, although the lineage and insignia were not. Nine years later, the 140th was similarly inactivated essentially simultaneously with the activation of the 368th Military Intelligence Battalion, to whom the personnel and facilities were transferred without the lineage and insignia.

== Location ==
The 140th MI Battalion, its HHS, A, B and C Companies were stationed at the General George S. Patton Jr. United States Army Reserve Center, located at 5340 Bandini Boulevard, in Bell, California. Patton USAR Center, the sprawling General Services Administration warehouse complex to the south, the U.S. Postal Service's processing center to the north and north-east, the National Guard armory to the west, and the adjacent commercial buildings to the east and immediate south, were constructed on what had been Cheli Air Force Station until 1961. In fiscal year 1991, the battalion's offices and motor pool removed from the facility's World War II–era temporary structures, into newly constructed buildings in the reserve centre; the same postal address was retained. The centre's wooden warehouse building, in which offices had been constructed, was razed, leaving only the cinderblock arms vault above the building's high slab. A new steel structure was built atop the slab, with essentially the same footprint as the original building.

The 307th and, subsequently, 651st Military Intelligence Companies were located 24 km (15 mi) north of the battalion, at the Captain Reginald B. Desiderio United States Army Reserve Center on Westminster Drive in Pasadena, California.

== Organization ==
Although assigned to the Army Reserve, the 140th Military intelligence Battalion was the organic military intelligence battalion of the 40th Infantry Division (Mechanized) of the California Army National Guard. The battalion's numerical designation followed U.S. Army custom of adding 100 to the supported infantry division's number; see also: the 1st Infantry Division's former 101st Military Intelligence Battalion and the 4th Infantry Division's former 104th Military Intelligence Battalion; cf: comparable battalions in armored divisions would have a number 500 greater than the division.

The battalion was composed of:

- Headquarters & Headquarters Services Company
- Company A (Collection & Jamming)
- Company B (Intelligence & Surveillance)
- Company C (Electronic Warfare)
- Detachment D (Long Range Surveillance) [The LRSD was assigned to the California Army National Guard during peacetime.]
- 1986–1989: 307th Military Intelligence Company [The 307th, in Pasadena, was assigned to the 140th only for peacetime command and control].
- 1989–1995: 651st Military Intelligence Company (Interrogation & Exploitation) (Echelons Above Corps) [The 651st, in Pasadena, was assigned to the 140th only for peacetime command and control].

== Training challenges ==
As the 40th Infantry Division's primary wartime trace was to the Eighth United States Army and the defense of South Korea, the 140th Military Intelligence Battalion was configured to specialize in the Korean and Mandarin Chinese languages. Obtaining and retaining language-qualified reserve soldiers in Southern California proved difficult.

Modest gains were made with the Army Reserve's institution of the Military Intelligence Special Training Element (MISTE, pronounced "misty") program, in which military intelligence units, including the 140th, were assigned language-qualified, MOS-qualified reserve soldiers (primarily those with prior active duty service) residing hundreds or thousands of miles away. Given the distance to be traveled, the MISTE soldiers would fly in to drill only bi-monthly, usually at Regional Training Site – Intelligence (RTS-I) at Hamilton Army Airfield north of San Francisco, California. The MISTE soldiers participated in annual training with the rest of the battalion.

Maintaining technical skills was also a problem, as much of the equipment—such as direction-finding trucks, radio intercept trucks, radio jamming trucks, inter alia—was prohibitively expensive for the Army to provide just to have it sit in storage twenty-eight days or more per month. Because of likely damage to streets, the battalion's M113 armored personnel carriers, M577 tactical operations center vehicles and M578 recovery vehicles were stored at Marine Corps Base Camp Pendleton; the three-hour round trip negated monthly training on the tracked vehicles.

When Iraq invaded Kuwait in August 1990, the four-year-old battalion was neither adequately manned nor trained for mobilization. Even had the battalion been at full, qualified strength, proficiency in Korean and Mandarin would have been of little use in Southwest Asia. Several of the battalion's reserve soldiers, however, were individually cross-leveled into other units and mobilized for Operation Desert Shield and Operation Desert Storm in 1990–1991.

== Mission ==
=== Battalion ===
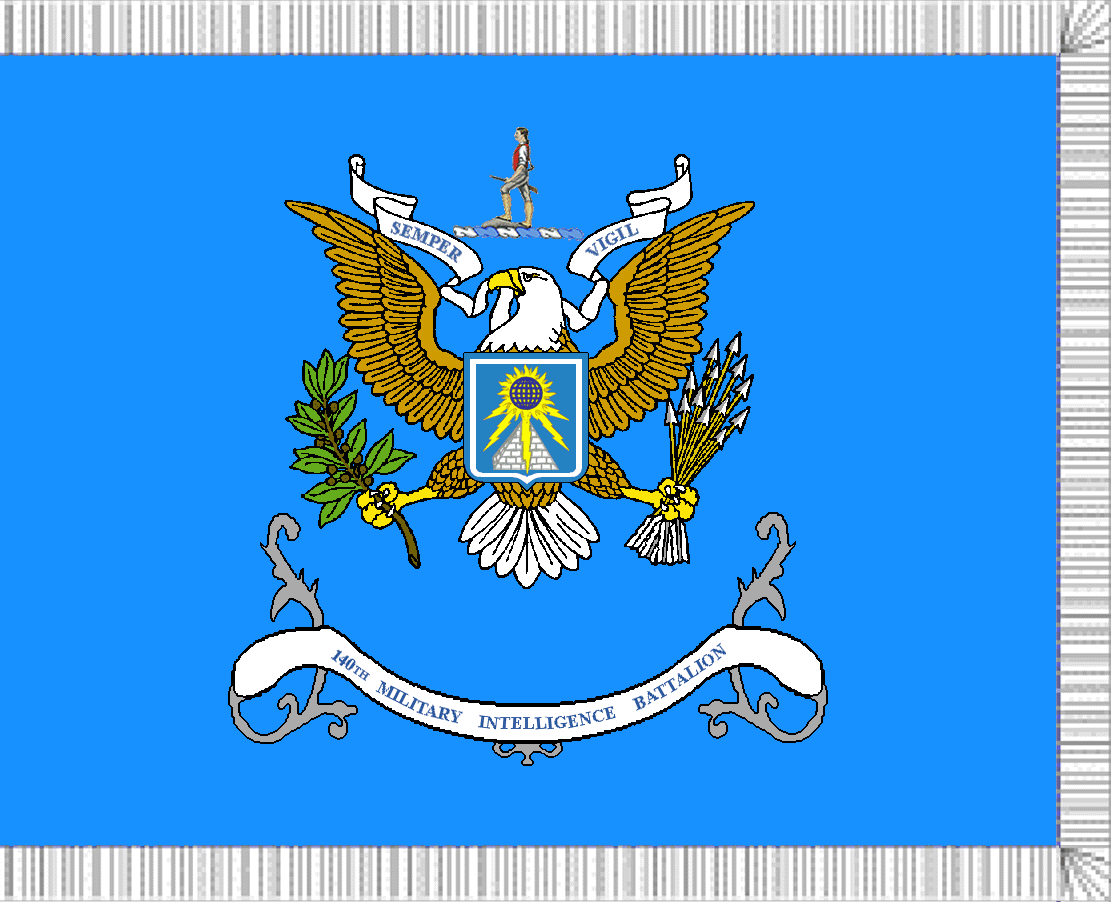
140th MI Battalion color

The mission of the 140th Military Intelligence Battalion (CEWI) (HD) was to command, control, staff, plan, and supervise its organic and attached companies which provide direct support intelligence, electronic warfare, non-communications intercept & analysis, human intelligence, counterintelligence, and ground surveillance radar support to the 40th Infantry Division. The battalion was organized with the intent of being able to:

- Provide command and control of organic, assigned and attached elements in a manner responsive to the needs of the supported battlefield commander.
- Exploit the voice, code, and non-communication transmissions collected by intercept teams.
- Interrogate enemy prisoners of war (EPWs), defectors, line crossers and other military and civilian personnel of intelligence or counterintelligence interest.
- Conduct counterintelligence operations intended to deny hostile intelligence gathering agencies knowledge of friendly forces' dispositions, capabilities, and intentions, and to provide for the security of friendly forces' operations.
- Maintain the enemy order of battle, electronic order of battle, and technical data files.
- Conduct offensive electronic warfare operations in support of the overall tactical plan.
- Conduct tactical deception plans.
- Provide limited maintenance, supply, mess, communications, and other logistical and administrative services to sustain operations on the battlefield.
- Conduct long range surveillance in support of the division's operations.
- Plan and assist in the coordination of battlefield deception operations for the division.

=== HHS Company ===
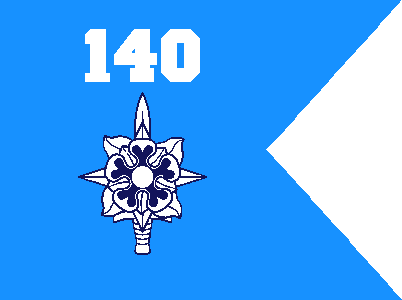
HHS Company guidon Note: The contemporary edition of AR 840-1 prescribed headquarters company/detachment/battery/troop guidons as bearing simply the unit number and (if applicable) branch insignia or shoulder sleeve insignia; no "HHS", "HHC", "HQ" or other headquarters designation was authorized at that time.

The Headquarters and Headquarters Services Company contained most of the battalion's analysis, supply, and communications personnel, as well as all of the IEW support, administration, vehicle maintenance, communications maintenance, and food service personnel. Accordingly, unlike a stereotypical battalion headquarters company, the HHS Company of a CEWI battalion comprised over half of the battalion's total authorised strength. The company's missions were to:

- Provide command, control and administrative support for the battalion.
- Provide command and control for assigned and supporting elements, staff planning, and management of assets,
- Provide maintenance of communication, electronics, intelligence & electronic warfare ("C-E/IEW") equipment, mechanical maintenance, and food service for the battalion.
- Provide radio telephone, Radioteletype ("RATT"), radio, and landline communication traffic support.
- Provide planning and execution of deception operations in support of the division.
- Provide an intelligence & electronic warfare support element ("IEWSE") as a liaison to each brigade S-2/3.
- Conduct analysis of information received from the platoon operations centers ("POCs") and other sources.

The major items of equipment organic to HHS Company included:

- AN/TYQ-5 Data Analysis Central
- AN/GRC-122 Radio Teletypewriter Set
- AN/TSC-87 Communications Terminal
- AN/TSC-58 Telegraph Terminal
- AN/UYK-71 Intelligence Data Processing Set

=== Alpha Company ===
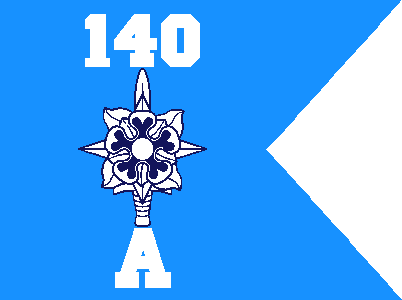
Alpha Company guidon

Company A (Collection and Jamming) was composed of three C&J platoons, a radio telegraphy team, and a traffic analysis section. Of the three C&J platoons, one each was concerned with:

- Very High Frequency electronic countermeasures,
- High frequency & Very High Frequency electronic countermeasures, or
- voice collection

The major items of equipment organic to Company A included:

- AN/TRQ-37 Radio Receiving Set
- AN/PRD-11 Radio Receiver Direction Finding Set
- AN/MLQ-34 Special Purpose Countermeasure Receiver/Transmitter System
- AN/ULQ-19 Responsive Jammer System (RACJAM)
- AN/TLQ-17A Special Purpose Countermeasure Set
- AN/GRC-122 Radio Teletypewriter Set
- OG-181/VRC Ground Based Communications Jamming System (Piranha)

=== Bravo Company ===
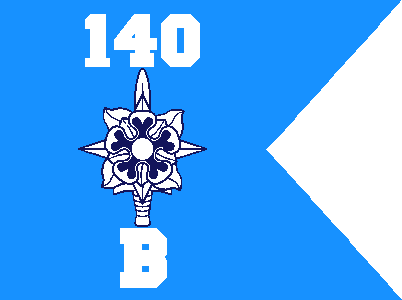
Bravo Company guidon

Company B (Intelligence and Surveillance) was divided into two very distinctive platoons. The ground surveillance radar platoon had three squads of scouts to carry, install, and utilise ground surveillance radars to observe enemy vehicle traffic. These three squads would provide GSR support to the division's three manoeuvre brigades.

The other platoon, known as the operations support element, was composed of two counterintelligence teams and two interrogation teams. The platoon was designed to conduct enemy prisoner of war interrogation and provide limited counterintelligence support to the division. Because an officer could not become qualified in either counterintelligence or human intelligence unless and until he or she completed the respective military intelligence officer advanced course, Company B was unusual in that the operations support platoon was led by a captain.

The major items of equipment organic to Company B were AN/PPS-5A Ground Surveillance Radar Sets.

=== Charlie Company ===
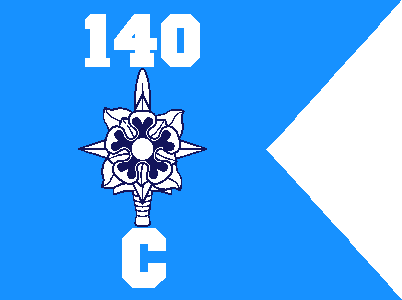
Charlie Company guidon

Company C (Electronic Warfare) was built around a large signals intelligence ("SIGINT") processing platoon composed of an analysis section, three non-communication intercept teams and five master control stations. Outside of the platoon was a radio teletypewriter section. Company C's mission was to:

- Provide the division with SIGINT support and electronic warfare support measures; and
- Provide the division with additional communications intelligence ("COMINT") and direction finding ("DF") capabilities.

The major items of equipment organic to Company C included:

- AN/TSQ-138 Master Control Set
- AN/MSQ-103 Special Purpose Receiving Set (Teampack)
- AN/GRC-122 Radio Teletypewriter Set

=== Long Range Surveillance Detachment ===
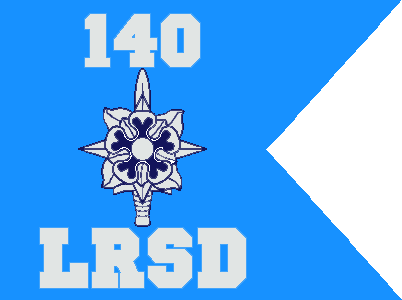
LRSD guidon

Detachment D (Long Range Surveillance) was an airborne infantry detachment, designed to parachute far in advance of friendly lines with radios and sufficient provisions to sustain themselves. Once in position, they were to remain camouflaged, while observing enemy activity and other conditions of intelligence value, and report their findings via radio.

=== 651st MI Company ===
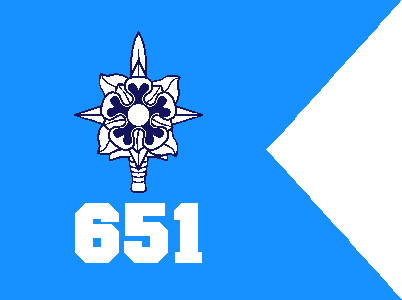
651st MI Company guidon

The 651st Military Intelligence Company (Interrogation and Exploitation) (Echelons Above Corps), designed to support a theatre army, was composed of a document exploitation team, a target exploitation team, a technical intelligence section, and six interrogation & exploitation squads in two platoons. The company's mission was to:

- Interrogate enemy prisoners of war, officials, defectors, line crossers and other military and civilian personnel having knowledge and/or of interest to intelligence, counterintelligence, technical intelligence, or electronics & communications.
- Examine captured material to determine their intelligence value. Disseminate this information to the units within the theatre of operations.
- Perform detailed translations of selected foreign documents and media from target languages into English and from English into target languages. Report and disseminate all information.
- Develop plans to exploit the information received through captured material, interrogation of enemy prisoners of war, and other intelligence sources.

The major items of equipment organic to the 651st MI Company included:

- AN/USS-2 Polygraph
- AN/TNH-23 Sound Recorder
- KS-99 Camera Set

== Insignia ==
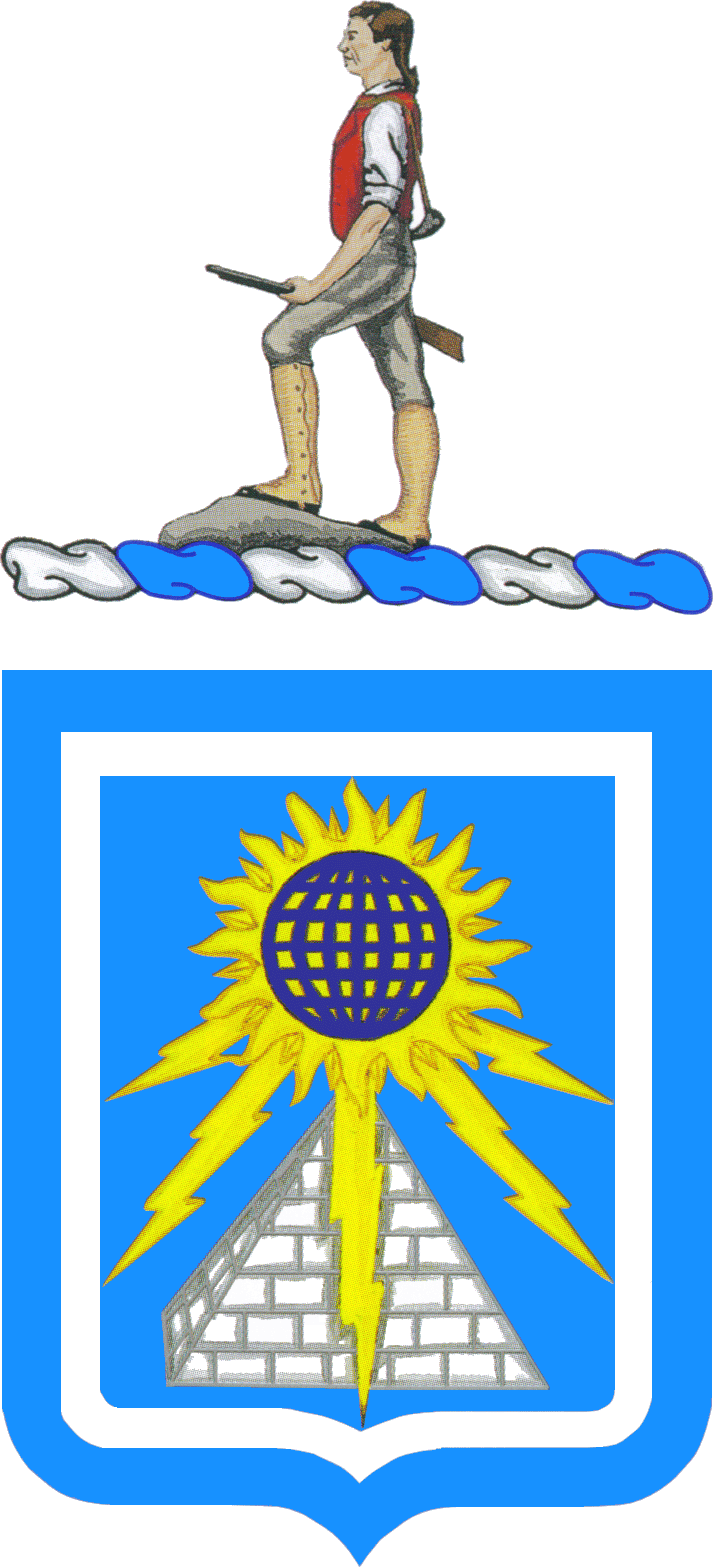

=== Coat of arms ===
Shield: Azure within an orle argent, in base a pyramid of the like and in chief a sun in splendor issuing to base five lightning flashes or and charged with a globe of the like grid-lined of the first.

Crest: That for the regiments and separate battalions of the Army Reserve: On a wreath of the colours, argent and azure, the Lexington Minuteman proper. The statue of the Minuteman, Capt. John Parker (Henry Hudson Kitson, sculptor), stands on the Common in Lexington, Massachusetts.

=== Motto ===
Semper Vigil (Latin for always watchful).

=== Distinctive unit insignia ===
The distinctive unit insignia is the shield and motto of the coat of arms.

=== Symbolism ===
Oriental blue and silver gray (white) are the colors associated with military intelligence. The sun represents the Greek god Helios who, according to mythology, could bring all secrets to light; surrounding a globe, it represents the unit's worldwide military intelligence mission. The lightning flashes suggest electronic warfare and communication capabilities. The sun and lightning flashes are gold and allude to California, the "Golden State," the unit's home area. The pyramid personifies longevity [ironically] and strength.
