= Medalha de Comportamento Exemplar =

Medalha de Comportamento Exemplar (Exemplary Behavior Medal)
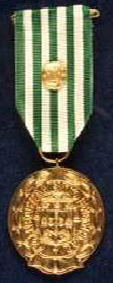
- Gold grade Medalha de Comportamento Exemplar

Awarded by Portuguese Republic
- Type: Order
- Established: 1863
- Eligibility: Portuguese and foreign military personnel
- Awarded for: Military men who have served throughout their career with exemplary moral and disciplinary conduct and proven spirit of loyalty.
- Status: Active

Precedence
- Next (higher): Medalha de Mérito Militar
- Next (lower): Medalha da Defesa Nacional

The Medalha de Comportamento Exemplar (Exemplary Conduct Medal), is a Portuguese military medal created on October 2, 1863, by decree of the Secretary of State for the Affairs of War. The medal three grades (gold, silver and copper), and distinguishes military personnel who have served throughout his or her career with exemplary moral and disciplinary conduct and proven spirit of loyalty to the Portuguese Republic.

== Grades ==
The exemplary conduct medal comprises the following grades:

- Gold Medal (MOCE) - Awarded to a military officer who has at least thirty years of military service, who has never suffered any criminal or disciplinary punishment and has shown a high sense of virtue, obedience, and military discipline.
- Silver Medal (MPCE) - Granted to a military officer who has at least fifteen years of effective military service, that has never undergone any criminal or disciplinary punishment.
- Copper Medal (MCCE) - Awarded to officers, sergeants and enlisted ranks who completes at least six years of effective military service and has never suffered any criminal or disciplinary punishment.

== Gallery ==
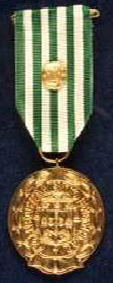
Gold Medal

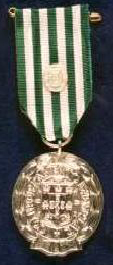
Silver Medal

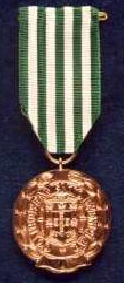
Bronze Medal
