= 140th Division =

In military terms, 140th Division or 140th Infantry Division may refer to:

- 140th Division (Imperial Japanese Army)
- 140th Rifle Division, Soviet Union

== See also ==
- List of military divisions by number
- 140th Brigade (disambiguation)
- 140th Regiment (disambiguation)
- 140th Squadron (disambiguation)
- 140th (disambiguation)
