= 140 =

140 may refer to:

- 140 (number), the natural number following 139 and preceding 141
- AD 140, a year of the Julian calendar
- 140 BC, a year of the pre-Julian Roman calendar
- 140 (video game), a 2013 platform game
- Tin King stop, MTR digital station code
- 140 Siwa, a main-belt asteroid

== See also ==
- 140th (disambiguation)
