= Orders, decorations, and medals of Portugal =

Portugal has a system of orders, decorations, and medals as a means of honouring individuals for personal bravery, achievement, or service to Portugal.

The honorific orders are currently regulated by Law 5/2011. The decorations are given by the President of the Portuguese Republic, currently António José Seguro. In addition the Portuguese government, through the Portuguese Red Cross legal framework, regulates and recognizes the Portuguese Red Cross Decorations.

== Ancient military orders ==
=== Military Order of Christ (Ordem Militar de Cristo) ===
The Military Order of Christ is one of the ancient military orders. It was created by request of King D. Dinis to the pope, upon the extinction of the Order of the Temple. The Templars had been granted important jurisdictions over the Portuguese territory, as well as being of strategic importance in its protection, in the end of the Christian Reconquest of the Iberian Peninsula. So, when the Order of the Temple was extinguished, King Dinis requested, and was granted, that all the possessions of this order in Portugal be attributed to a new order, to be created: the order of Christ. In essence, the Templars in Portugal simply changed name.

The headquarters of the Order were established in Tomar. The Order had a major role in the Portuguese discoveries. In the course of the subsequent centuries, the King of Portugal became the grand-master of this and all of the military orders, which acquired a simple honorific role.

The Order of Christ is now conferred by relevant services to the country in the exercise of functions related to the government or public administration (e.g., courts, diplomacy, armed forces)

== Orders of civil merit ==
=== Orders of Entrepreneurial Merit (Ordem do Mérito Empresarial) ===
- Category of Agricultural Merit (Portuguese: Classe do Mérito Agrícola)
- Category of Commercial Merit (Portuguese: Classe do Mérito Commercial)
- Category of Industrial Merit (Portuguese: Classe do Mérito Industrial)

== Royal Dynastic Orders ==
During Portugal's time as a monarchy, several orders were created by the sovereign as honorific orders and not military orders. As such, when Portugal became a republic, these orders remained with the House of Braganza as dynastic orders and were not nationalized by the Portuguese Republic. Their Grand-Masters are Duarte Pio, Duke of Braganza and Isabel, Duchess of Braganza.

== Decorations ==
- Military Valor Medal (Portuguese: Medalha de Valor Militar), established on 2 October 1863 to reward "heroic deeds of extraordinary selflessness and bravery or great moral courage and exceptional ability to make decisions, whether in war or in time of peace, but always in circumstances where there is proven or suspected danger to life". It comprises three grades - Gold (Portuguese: Ouro), Silver (Portuguese: Prata) and Copper (Portuguese: Cobre). Award of the Medal in Gold confers entitlement to wear a fourragère.
- War Cross War Cross (Class III) (Note: Portuguese: Cruz de Guerra Class III – Device is a silver cross) (Portuguese: Medalha da Cruz de Guerra), established on 30 November 1916 to reward acts of bravery and deeds performed in wartime. It could be awarded to military personnel and civilians as well as to foreign military personnel and civilians. It may also be awarded to military units and to towns 'that have collectively practiced feats of arms of exceptional value.' It is awarded in four classes. Award of the Gold (1st Class) confers entitlement to wear a fourragère.
- Distinguished Service Medal (Portuguese: Medalha de Serviços Distintos), established on 2 October 1863 as the Good Services Medal (Portuguese: Medalha de Bons Serviços) to recognise extraordinary military service or outstanding acts. Originally it consisted of two classes - gold and silver - and was awarded only to military officers. On 11 September 1919, the regulations were modified to add a third class (copper) in order to recognise non-commissioned officers and soldiers. On 28 May 1946, the name of the medal was changed to the Distinguished Service Medal.
- Military Merit Medal Medal for Military Merit (Grand Cross) (GCMM) (Note: Portuguese: Medalha de Mérito Militar - Grã-Cruz – Awarded to members of the military of the following ranks: General officer) (Portuguese: Medalha de Mérito Militar), established on 28 May 1946 to reward military personnel for meritorious service as demonstrated by a display of exceptional qualities, military virtues, a spirit of sacrifice and selflessness, moral courage, bravery and loyalty that are deserving of public recognition. The medal was established in five classes - Grand Cross (Portuguese: Grã-Cruz) (for ministers and secretaries of military departments and generals), 1st Class (for Colonel and above with at least 20 years service), 2nd Class (for Captain-Lieutenant and above with at least 10 years of service), 3rd Class (for junior officers holding the rank of Captain or below and with at least 2 years service), and 4th class (non-commissioned officers and soldiers with at least 2 years service).
- National Defense Medal (Portuguese: Medalha da Defesa Nacional)
- St George's Cross (Portuguese: Medalha da Cruz de São Jorge)
- Navy Cross (Portuguese: Medalha da Cruz Naval)
- D. Afonso Henriques Medal (Portuguese: Medalha de D. Afonso Henriques)
- Army Merit Medal (Portuguese: Medalha de Mérito do Exército)
- Aeronautical Merit Medal (Portuguese: Medalha de Mérito Aeronáutico)
- Exemplary Behaviour Medal (Portuguese: Medalha de Comportamento Exemplar), established on 2 October 1863 to recognise meritorious long service with exemplary behaviour. It was established in three grades - gold (30 years exemplary service), silver (15 years exemplary service) and copper (non-commissioned officers and soldiers with 6 years of exemplary service).

== Medals ==
- Campaign Service Medal (Portuguese: Medalha Comemorativa das Campanhas), established on 30 November 1916 to recognise wartime service. The medal is issued with a clasp for each military campaign the recipient has served in. Eligibility for the medal was backdated to the Mozambique campaign of 1897–98.
- Special Service Commissions Medal (Portuguese: Medalha Comemorativa de Comissões de Serviço Especiais), established on 28 May 1946 to recognise service during 'non-warlike' operations.
- Expeditionary Medal (Portuguese: Medalha de Expedições)
- Distinguished Achievement on Operations Medal (Portuguese: Medalha dos Promovidos por Feitos Distintos em Campanha), established on 28 May 1946 to replace an earlier insignia established on 2 December 1919. The medal is awarded to recognise distinguished command and leadership on military operations. It consists of one class, however it is awarded with a gold star for the ribbon when awarded to generals, a silver star when awarded to officers and a copper star when awarded to non-commissioned officers and soldiers.
- Wounded on Operations Medal (Portuguese: Medalha dos Mutilados em Campanha), established on 28 May 1946 to replace an earlier badge established on 5 October 1918. The medal is awarded to recognise military personnel who have been permanently wounded in war or war-like, such wounds being characterised by amputation, loss of an organ or permanent functional impairment.
- Recognition Medal (Portuguese: Medalha de Reconhecimento), established on 27 December 2002 to recognise military personnel who have been captured during war or other military missions such including peacekeeping and humanitarian missions.
- Victory Medal (Portuguese: Medalha da Vitória)
- 500th Anniversary of the Death of the Infante Commemorative Medal (Portuguese: Medalha Comemorativa do 5.° Centário da Morte do Infante), established in 1960.
- Red Cross Medal (Portuguese: Medalha da Cruz Vermelha)

== Orders of Precedence ==
=== Current Order of Precedence ===
(Established by Decree-Law No 316/2002 of 27 December 2002)

1. Order of the Tower and Sword
2. Military Valor Medal
3. Cruz de Guerra
4. Military Order of Christ
5. Military Order of Aviz
6. Distinguished Service Medal
7. Military Merit Medal
8. Military Order of St James of the Sword
9. Order of Infante D. Henrique
10. Order of Liberty
11. Distinguished services or relevant overseas services
12. Exemplary Behaviour Medal
13. Distinguished Achievement on Operations Medal
14. Wounded in Battle Medal
15. Recognition Medal
16. Campaign Service Medal
17. Special Service Commissions Commemorative Medal
18. Other National Orders
19. Other National Medals
20. Foreign Orders, Decorations and Medals

Notes

1. Distinguished services or relevant overseas services: the National Defense Medal, the St George's Cross, Navy Cross, D. Afonso Henriques Medal, Army Merit Medal, and Aeronautical Merit Medal.
2. Other National Orders: Order of Merit, Order of Public Instruction, Order of Agricultural Merit, Order of Commercial Merit, Order of Industrial Merit
3. Other National Medals: 500th Anniversary of the Death of the Infante Commemorative Medal

=== Former Order of Precedence ===
(As prior to the 1974 Carnation Revolution)

1. Order of the Tower and Sword
2. Military Valor Medal
3. War Cross
4. Distinguished Service Medal
5. Military Merit Medal
6. Military Order of Aviz
7. Military Order of Christ
8. Military Order of St James of the Sword
9. Order of the Colonial Empire (no longer awarded)
10. Order of Infante D. Henrique
11. Distinguished Services or Relevant Overseas Services
12. Exemplary Behaviour Medal
13. Distinguished Achievement on Operations Medal
14. Wounded in Battle Medal
15. Campaign Service Medal
16. Victory Medal
17. Special Service Commissions Commemorative Medal
18. Other National Orders
19. Other National Medals
20. Foreign Orders, Decorations and Medals

Notes

1. Other National Orders: Order of Merit, Order of Public Instruction, Order of Agricultural, Commercial or Industrial Merit
2. Other National Medals: 500th Anniversary of the Death of the Infante Commemorative Medal
