= Military Valor Medal =

Valour Award of Portugal

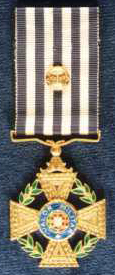
- Military Valor Medal in gold
- Type: Military decoration
- Country: Portugal
- Established: 2 October 1863; 163 years ago

Precedence
- Next (higher): Order of the Tower and Sword
- Next (lower): War Cross

The Military Valor Medal (Portuguese: Medalha de Valor Militar) is a prestigious military decoration and the second highest honour in Portugal. Established on 2 October 1863, it is awarded for heroic deeds of extraordinary selflessness and bravery, or great moral courage and exceptional ability to make decisions, whether in war or peace, but always in circumstances where there is proven or suspected danger to life. The Medal is divided into three grades - Gold (Ouro), Silver (Prata) and Copper (Cobre). The award of the Gold Medal confers the entitlement to wear a fourragère.

== Conditions of Award ==
The Military Medal of Valor is awarded to military personnel, Portuguese or foreign, who have displayed exceptional bravery and selflessness in the face of the enemy. It is divided into three classes: Gold, Silver, and Bronze, with Gold being the highest.

=== Grades ===
The Medal of Military Valor has 3 grades (graus):

1. Gold Grade (MOVM)
2. Silver Grade (MPVM)
3. Grade Bronze (MCVM)

The grade is awarded based on accomplishments of the individual and not their military rank.

When it is intended to award heroic deeds in a military campaign, the Medal of Military Valor is awarded with palm :

1. Gold Grade with Palm (MOVM)
2. Silver Grade with Palm (MPVM)
3. Grade Bronze with Palm (MCVM)

The different grades of the medal are awarded as follows:

1. Gold Military Medal of Valor – awarded to military personnel who, in the face of the enemy, have displayed exceptional bravery and selflessness characterized by their valor, decisiveness, and willingness to risk their own lives.
2. Silver Military Medal of Valor – awarded to military personnel who have shown bravery and selflessness, characterized by their valor, decisiveness, and willingness to risk their own lives in the face of the enemy.
3. Bronze Military Medal of Valor – awarded to military personnel who have shown courage and decisiveness, characterized by their bravery and selflessness in the face of the enemy.

=== Other conditions ===
The Military Medal of Valor may also be awarded to units or subunits that have shown exceptional bravery and selflessness in the face of the enemy, provided that this distinction does not correspond to a higher collective award. Additionally, the medal may be awarded posthumously.

== Design ==
=== Gold ===
The design of this medal (since 1971) in its "Gold Grade" is as follows:

- On the obverse, or front, it is a straight-lined patée cross, chiseled in gold, resting on a circular crown of laurel leaves, fruited, all in green, and having overlaid at the center, a national emblem (consisting of the national coat of arms, in its metals and enamels, resting on a golden armillary sphere), surrounded by a blue border with the legend "VALOR MILITAR", in uppercase Elzevir type letters, in gold.
- The reverse side is a plain gold, with the name and rank of the awardee, as well as the year in which the medal was received, engraved on it.
- The suspension ribbon is wavy silk, with nine longitudinal stripes, equal in width, consisting of five blue and four white, arranged alternately. Each stripe has a width of 3 mm, completing a width of 30 cm which is the general standard for the suspension ribbons of any Portuguese military medal. At the center of the ribbon, a national shield is placed, resting on a golden armillary sphere. The ribbon bar and the tulip-shaped buckle are also in gold. The suspension ribbon will also receive a golden palm when won for feats or services in campaign.

=== Silver ===
This medal, in the "Silver Grade", differs only in that the national coat of arms on the ribbon, as well as the ribbon bar, the buckle, and the pendant (the medal itself) are in silver.

=== Bronze ===
In the "Bronze Grade", it differs from the previous grades in that the ribbon bar, the buckle, and the pendant are in bronze, and it does not have the national coat of arms on the suspension ribbon.

It is noteworthy that the Military Valor Medal bears a resemblance to the Peninsular War Cross, created about a century and a half before. Both the patée cross shape, with straight lines and resting on a circular crown of gold leaves, as well as the tulip-shaped buckle, seem to indicate an undisguised inspiration.

Military Valor Medal (Medalha de Valor Militar)
	Gold Grade (MOVM)	Silver Grade (MPVM)	Bronze Grade (MCVM)
Medal	Military Valor Medal in Gold	Military Valor Medal in Silver	Military Valor Medal in bronze
Ribbon	Military Valor Medal MOVM	Military Valor Medal MPVM	Military Valor Medal MPVM
Ribbon with palm	Military Valor Medal MOVM	Military Valor Medal MPVM	Military Valor Medal MPVM

The Military Medal of Valor is a highly prestigious award that recognizes the exceptional bravery, selflessness, and courage of military personnel who have faced danger and adversity in the line of duty.
