= 140th Brigade =

140th Brigade may refer to:

- 140th Anti-Aircraft Rocket Brigade, Russia
- 140th Mixed Brigade, Spain
- 140th (4th London) Brigade, United Kingdom

== See also ==
- 140th Division (disambiguation)
- 140th Regiment (disambiguation)
