= Reginald B. Desiderio =

United States Army Medal of Honor recipient (1918–1950)

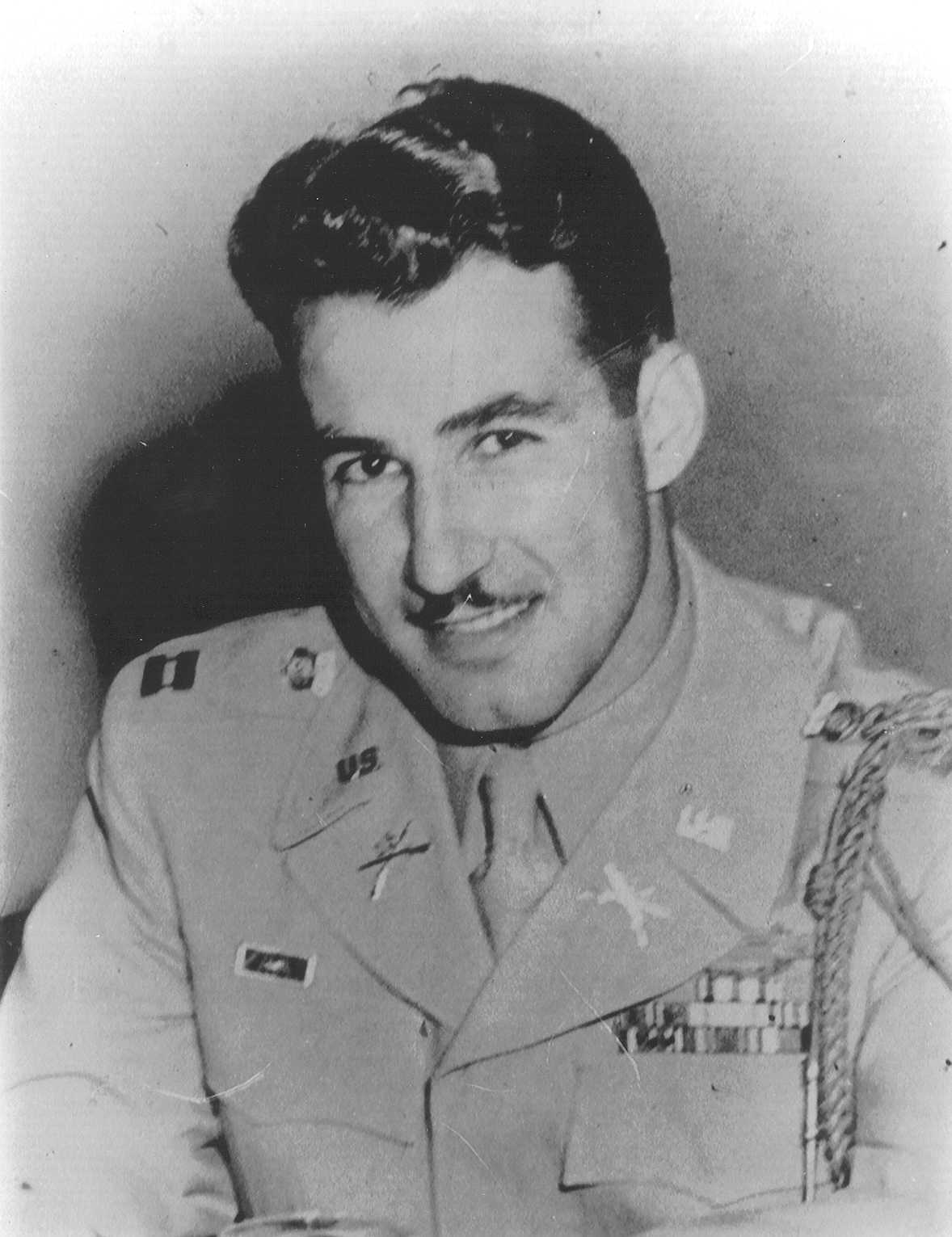
- Desiderio in c. 1940s
- Born: September 12, 1918; Clairton, Pennsylvania, United States
- Died: November 27, 1950 (aged 32); Ipsok, Ch'ongch'on River, Korea
- Burial place: San Francisco National Cemetery
- Military career
- Allegiance: United States
- Branch: United States Army
- Service years: 1941–1950
- Rank: Captain
- Units: Company E, 27th Infantry Regiment, 25th Infantry Division
- Conflicts: World War II; Korean War: Second Phase Offensive; Battle of the Ch'ongch'on River; Battle of Ipsok (DOW)
- Awards: Medal of Honor; Silver Star; Bronze Star Medal (3); Purple Heart

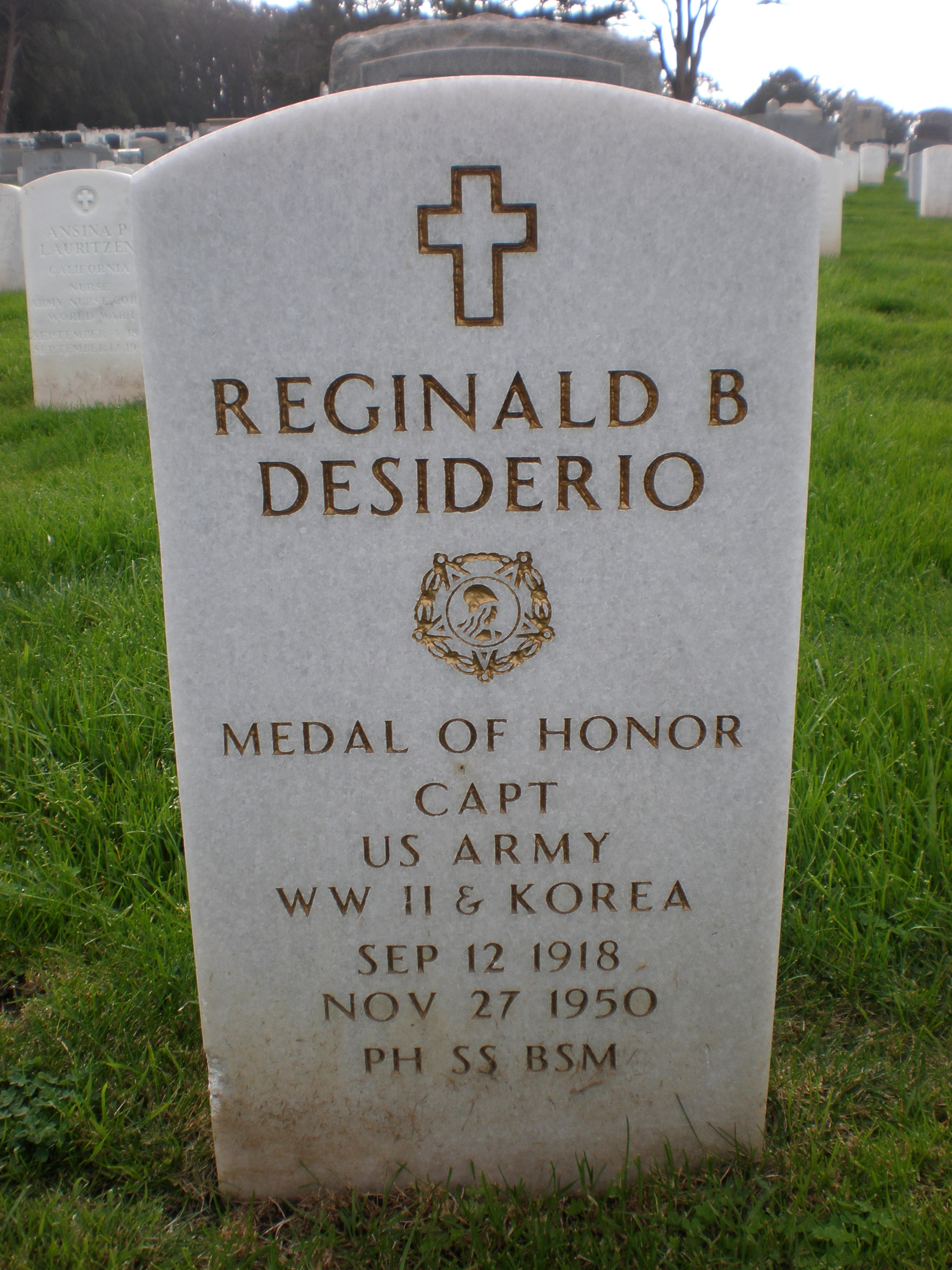
Desiderio's grave marker in San Francisco National Cemetery

Reginald Benjamin Desiderio (September 12, 1918 – November 27, 1950) was a soldier in the United States Army who was posthumously awarded the Medal of Honor for his actions on November 27, 1950, during the Battle of the Ch'ongch'on River.

Desiderio joined the army from Gilroy, California, in March 1941. He is buried in San Francisco National Cemetery in San Francisco, California.

== Honors ==
The United States Army Reserve Center on Westminster Drive in Pasadena, California, is named in his honor, as is the airfield at USAG Humphreys (ICAO: RKSG) in Pyongtaek, South Korea.

There is a memorial park dedicated to him in his hometown of Clairton, Pennsylvania, containing a World War I artillery piece and a 1950s missile. There is also a street named in his honor nearby.

== Medal of Honor citation ==
Rank and organization: Captain, U.S. Army, commanding officer, Company E, 27th Infantry Regiment, 25th Infantry Division

Place and date: Near Ipsok, Korea, November 27, 1950

Entered service at: Gilroy, Calif. Born: September 12, 1918, Clairton, Pa

G.O. No.: 58, August 2, 1951

Citation:

Capt. Desiderio distinguished himself by conspicuous gallantry and intrepidity at the repeated risk of his life above and beyond the call of duty. His company was given the mission of defending the command post of a task force against an enemy breakthrough. After personal reconnaissance during darkness and under intense enemy fire, he placed his men in defensive positions to repel an attack. Early in the action he was wounded, but refused evacuation and despite enemy fire continued to move among his men checking their positions and making sure that each element was prepared to receive the next attack. Again wounded, he continued to direct his men. By his inspiring leadership he encouraged them to hold their position. In the subsequent fighting when the fanatical enemy succeeded in penetrating the position, he personally charged them with carbine, rifle, and grenades, inflicting many casualties until he himself was mortally wounded. His men, spurred on by his intrepid example, repelled this final attack. Capt. Desiderio's heroic leadership, courageous and loyal devotion to duty, and his complete disregard for personal safety reflect the highest honor on him and are in keeping with the esteemed traditions of the U.S. Army.

== Medals and decorations ==

Badge	Combat Infantryman Badge with Star denoting 2nd award		
1st row	Medal of Honor		
2nd row	Silver Star	Bronze Star Medal with 2 Oak leaf clusters	Purple Heart
3rd row	American Defense Service Medal	American Campaign Medal	European-African-Middle Eastern Campaign Medal with 2 Campaign stars
4th row	World War II Victory Medal	Army of Occupation Medal with 'Germany' clasp	National Defense Service Medal
5th row	Korean Service Medal with 2 Campaign stars	United Nations Service Medal Korea	Korean War Service Medal Retroactively Awarded, 2003
Unit awards	Presidential Unit Citation with 1 Oak leaf cluster		Korean Presidential Unit Citation

== See also ==
- List of Korean War Medal of Honor recipients
