= Fourragère =

Honorific braided cord worn on military uniforms

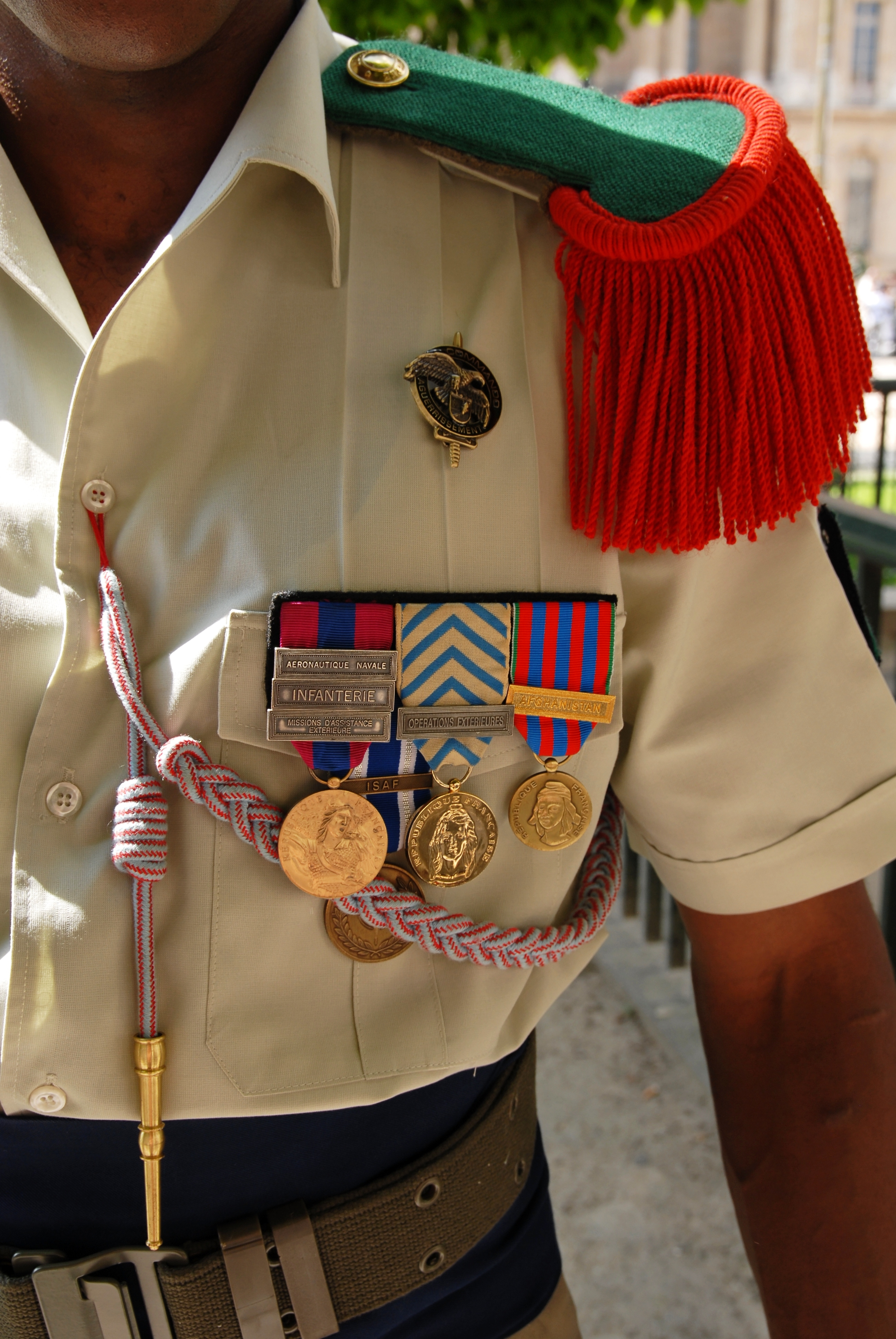
Blue and red fourragère of the Croix de Guerre TOE worn by a soldier of the 2nd Foreign Infantry Regiment (2^{e} REI). The fourragère is the braided cord passing under the medals and around the soldier's side.

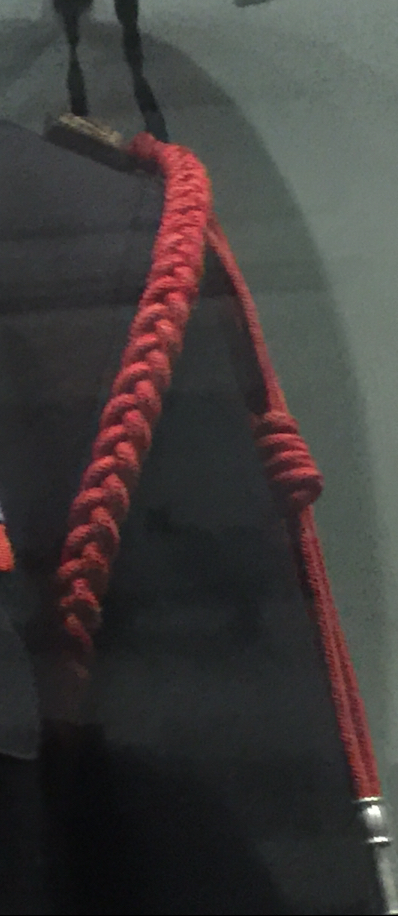
The fourragère of the Order of the Legion of Honor

The fourragère (French: [fuʁaʒɛʁ], from fourrage, "fodder") is a military award, distinguishing military units as a whole, in the form of a braided cord. The award was first adopted by France, followed by other nations such as the Netherlands, Belgium, Portugal, and Luxembourg. Fourragères have been awarded to units of both national and foreign militaries, except for that of Luxembourg, which has not been awarded to any foreign units.

The origin of the award is not entirely certain, but at least two conjectural stories have been posited. The first involves Flemish soldiers serving under the Duke of Alva who were reported as having been cowardly in battle. The Duke threatened them all with hanging if they did not perform better in future engagements, and the soldiers, so insulted by the insinuation, took to wearing cords tied to large nails around their shoulders, as if to say "Hang me by this cord and nail if you see me run from battle." Following this, the unit's members performed so well that the rope and nail became a badge of honor.

The other is that to the extent that an aiguillette is a form of fourragère, the wearing of armor by European knights required the use of ropes with metal tabs and a squire to cinch the armor into place—the squire would carry these cords over his shoulder, hence the association with aides de camp.

== France ==
=== History ===
As a regimental distinction the fourragère should not be confused with the aiguillette (distinctive insignia of the aide-de-camp) which was introduced by Napoleon I and which it closely resembles (the aiguillette is merely a golden fourragère).

The modern fourragère of the French Army is awarded to all members of military units which have been awarded a mention in despatches. It should not be confused with unit awards of particular decorations, where the medal itself is hung on the flag of the unit. For example, there are many units wearing the fourragère of the médaille militaire, whereas only six units wore the medal on their flags.

It was introduced during the First World War, when the French Ministry of War first awarded the fourragère to units which had been recorded as distinguishing themselves more than once in the Orders of the Army. There were then six fourragères, depending on the numbers of Mentions in dispatches awarded to the unit:

Numbers of mentions	First and Second World Wars	Overseas Wars	Operations since 1952
9,10 or 11	Double, red (color of the légion d'honneur) and green with red stripes (colors of the croix de guerre 14-18)	not awarded	not awarded
6, 7 or 8	Simple, red (color of the légion d'honneur)	Simple, red, with an olive red and blue (colors of the croix de guerre Overseas)	not awarded
4 or 5	Simple, yellow with green stripes (colors of the médaille militaire)	Simple, yellow with green stripes, with an olive red and blue	not awarded
2 or 3	Simple, green with red stripes (colors of the croix de guerre 14-18)	Simple, red and blue	Simple, red and white (colors of the croix de la Valeur Militaire)

If a unit received this distinction in both the First and Second World Wars, its fourragère bears two olives, one for each conflict it earned mentions. These olives are different:

numbers of mentions	First World War	Second World War
9, 10 or 11	half-red and half-green with red stripes, the two halves separated by a white ring	not awarded
6, 7 or 8	half-red and half-green with red stripes	not awarded
4 or 5	half-yellow with green stripes and half-green with red stripes	half-yellow with green stripes and half-red with green stripes
2 or 3	green with red stripes	red with green stripes

During the Second World War, the medal of the Ordre de la Libération was awarded to the flags of 17 military units, whose members now wear a fourragère since June 18, 1996. This fourragère is considered the top unit award in the French military, as the ordre de la Libération award is seen to be more important than any mention in dispatches.

Certain French military units wear combinations of fourragères, if they were mentioned in orders in both one of the World War and an overseas (colonial) war. For example, the famous Foreign Legion regiment the 3rd Foreign Infantry wears a double fourragère red and green with red stripes (9 mentions during World War I), with an olive red with green stripes (3 mentions during World War II) and a fourragère yellow with green stripes, with an olive red and blue (5 mentions during Overseas Wars).

Fourragères used by the French Foreign Legion are:

- 2e REI (2nd Foreign Legion Infantry) – croix de guerre des TOE
- 2e REP (2nd Foreign Legion Paratroops) – Légion d'honneur
- 1er REC (1st Foreign Legion Cavalry) - Croix de Guerre (World War II); croix de guerre des TOE
- 3e REI (3rd Foreign Legion Infantry) – Légion d'honneur, Médaille militaire, Croix de Guerre
- 13e DBLE (13th Foreign Legion Demi-Brigade) – Ordre de la Libération

=== Personal wear of the fourragère ===
The fourragère is normally worn by members of a unit awarded the decoration. When they leave the unit, they have to relinquish the fourragère. However members who took part personally in the actions leading to the award of the fourragère can continue to wear the fourragère, even after leaving the unit. They can only wear a fourragère corresponding to the number of actions they actually took part in. Thus, if a member of a 5-mentions regiment leaves but took part in only two mentioned actions, he can only wear the croix de guerre fourragère and not the médaille militaire fourragère.

=== Pictures ===
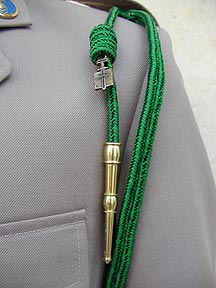
Fourragère aux couleurs du ruban de l'Ordre de la Libération

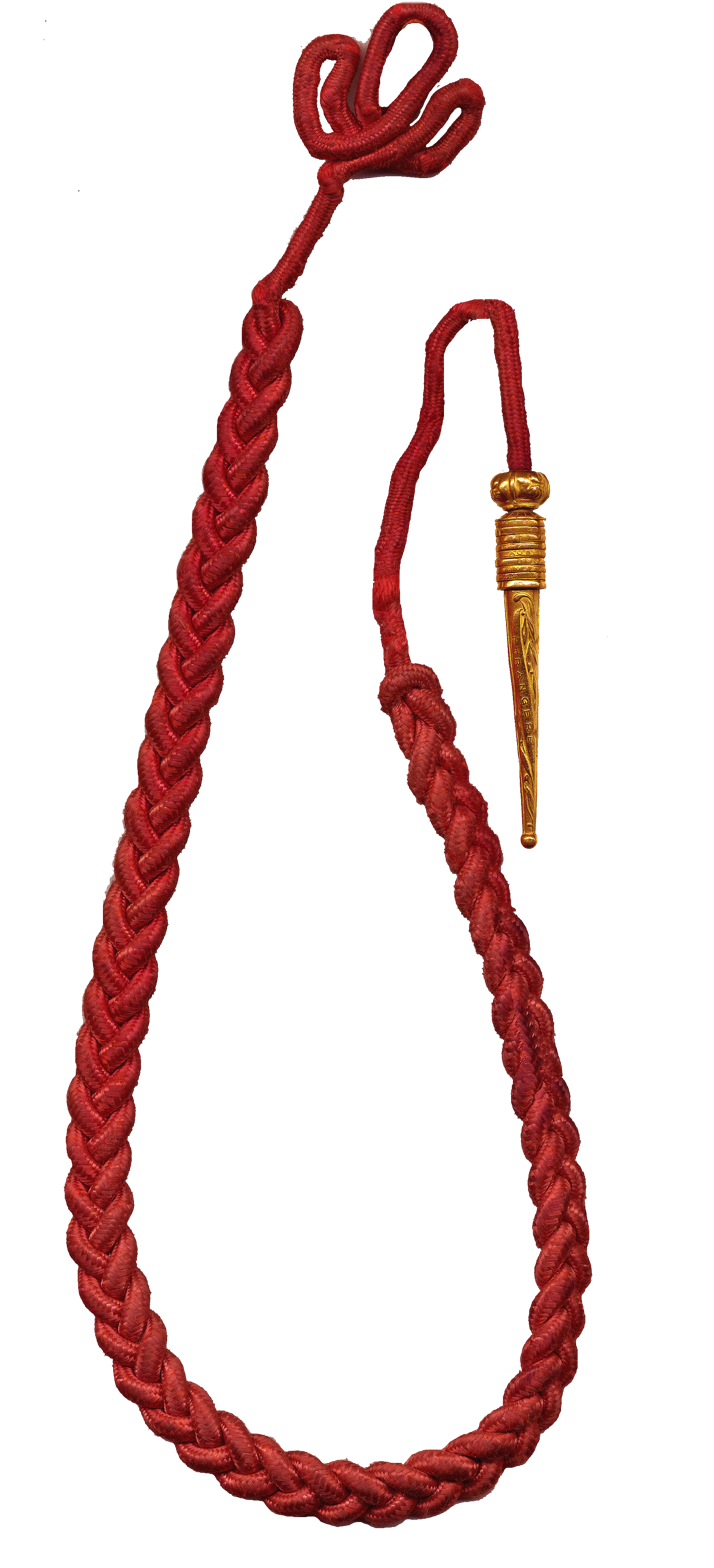
Fourragère aux couleurs de la Légion d'honneur

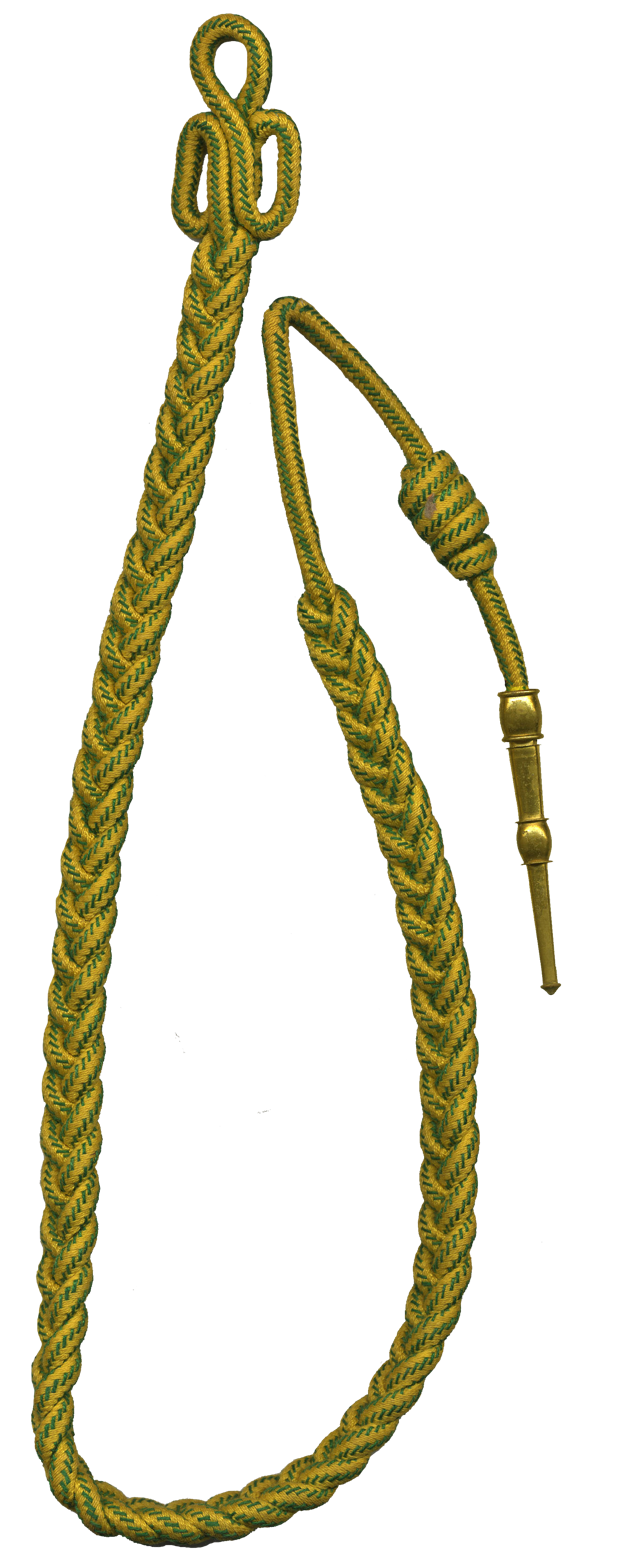
Fourragère aux couleurs de la Médaille militaire

Fourragère aux couleurs de la croix de guerre 1914-1918

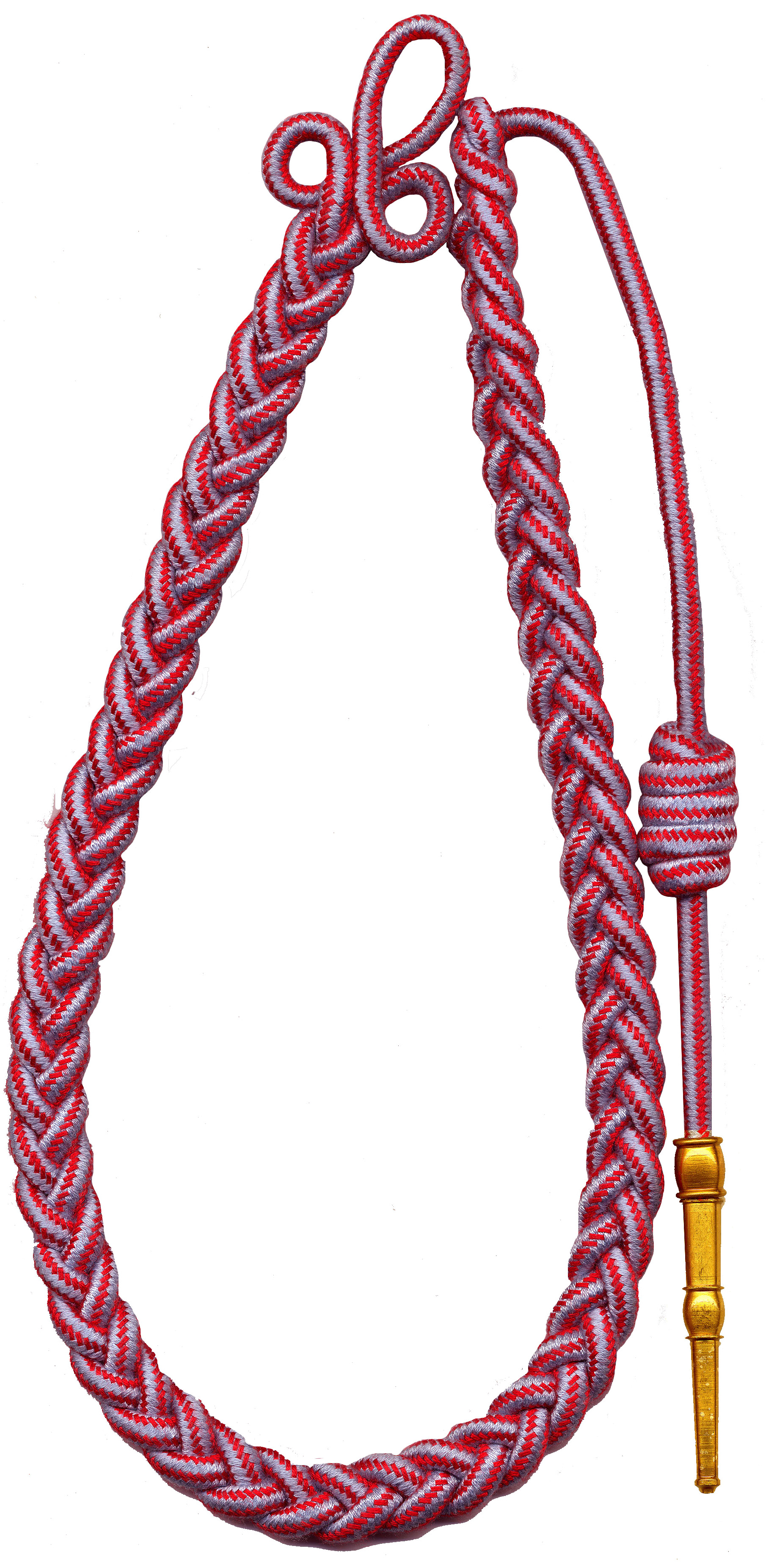
Fourragère aux couleurs de la croix de guerre des TOE

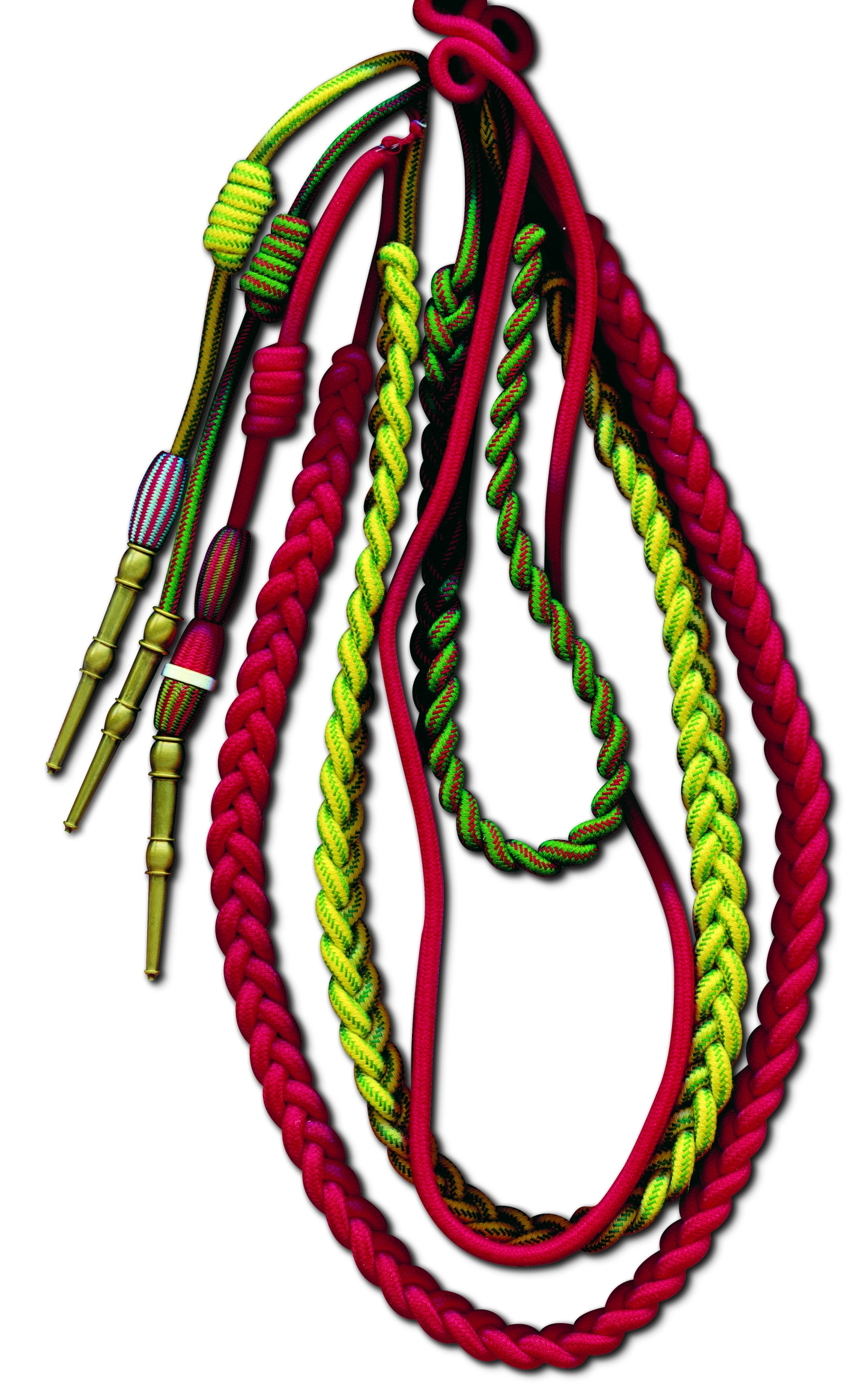
The most impressive set of fourragères: double fourragère of Légion d'honneur and Croix de Guerre with olives of both World War I (9 mentions) and World War II (3 mentions) and fourragère of Médaille militaire with olive of TOE (4 mentions). Worn by members of 3 REI.

== American Units awarded the fourragère ==
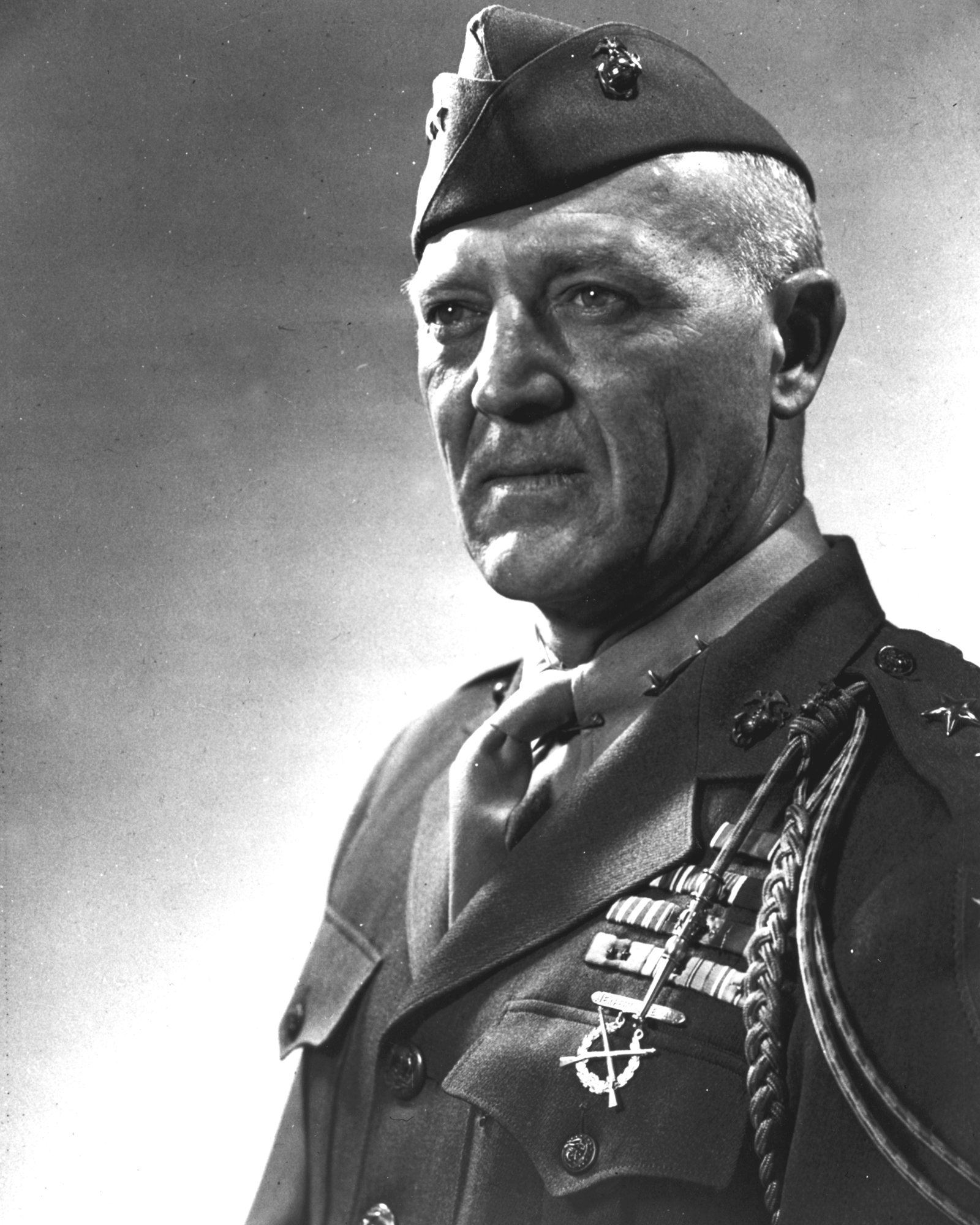
Gen Graves B. Erskine wearing the fourragère with the cords hanging over the sleeve, a mark of being in the military unit when the award was made

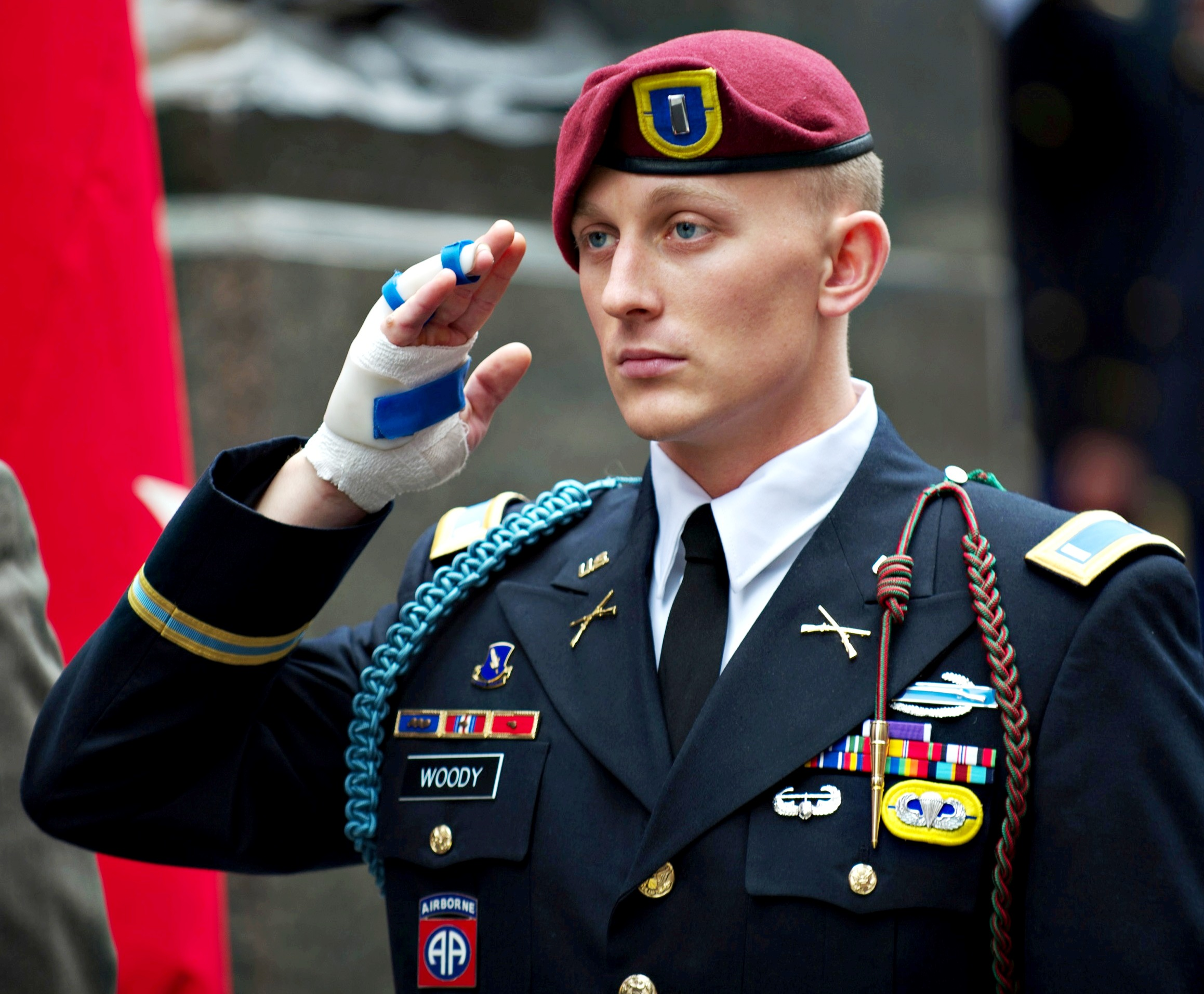
1LT Alexander Woody, with the 82nd Airborne Division, wearing the fourragère that was awarded to the division for its performance at the Battle of Normandy in 1944; note the lack of outside cords

- The 5th Marine Regiment, the 6th Marine Regiment, and the 5th Machine Gun Battalion of the United States Marine Corps were awarded the fourragère for having earned the Croix de Guerre with palm leaf three times during World War I.
- The 9th Infantry Regiment, 23rd Infantry Regiment, 12th Field Artillery Regiment, 15th Field Artillery Regiment, 17th Field Artillery Regiment, 2nd Engineer Battalion, 1st Field Signal Battalion, 2nd Trench Artillery, 2nd Sanitary Train, 2nd Division, A.E.F., was awarded the French Croix de Guerre with Palm three times, and awarded the French fourragère for service during World War I campaigns at Chateau Thierry, Aisne-Marne, and Meuse-Argonne. In addition, because several U.S. soldiers were present in front-line action during each battle for which all the unit within the 2nd Division was awarded the Croix de Guerre, the French Government and U.S. Army Adjutant General allowed these soldiers to wear the fourragère as an individual decoration regardless of future unit assignment—a very rare honor. In total, 30,000 A.E.F. officers and men were certified to wear the French fourragère as an individual decoration, per the Final Report of the Secretary of War, 1922.
- During World War I, the 5th S.S.U. and 646th S.S.U. was awarded the fourragère aux couleurs du ruban de la médaille militaire.
- During World War II, the 16th, 18th, and 26th Infantry Regiments, the 5th and 7th Field Artillery Battalions, the 1st Engineer Battalion and the 1st Signal Company were awarded the fourragère aux couleurs du ruban de la médaille militaire.
- 17 French military units wear the fourragère of the Ordre de la Libération
- 370th Infantry Regiment (World War I)
- 82nd Airborne Division during the Battle of Normandy in June 1944.
- The 3rd Division (Marne Division) was awarded the Fourragère aux couleurs de la Croix de Guerre for service to France in WW II.
- The 79th Infantry Division was awarded the Fourragère aux couleurs de la Croix de Guerre for its actions in helping liberate Paris from June 1944 through 27 August 1944 and helping liberate Baccarat, Phalsbourg and Saverne from 21–24 November 1944.
- The 12th Field Artillery Regiment was awarded the French fourragère in World War I and the Belgian fourragère in World War II.
- The 102nd Cavalry Regiment was awarded the French and Belgian Croix de Guuerre in World War II.
- The 104th Infantry Regiment, 26th Infantry Division was awarded the French Croix de Guerre in World War I and World War II.
- The 121st Cavalry Squadron of the 106th Cavalry Group, XV Corps, was awarded the French Croix de Guerre and French fourragère for actions during World War II.
- The 143rd Infantry Regiment, 36th Division, Texas Army National Guard, was awarded the French Croix de Guerre in connection with its action fought at Meuse-Argonne during World War I.
- The 4th Infantry Division, consisting of the 8th, 12th (both cited twice) and the 22nd Infantry Regiments were awarded the Belgian fourragère for action in the Battle of the Bulge. The 8th Infantry was awarded the Presidential Unit Citation for the Beaches of Normandy, the 12th Infantry for Luxembourg (Battle of the Bulge) and the 22nd Infantry received three Presidential Unit Citations for Carentan (France), St. Gillis_Marigny (France), and the Hurtgen Forest (Battle of the Bulge).
- The 2nd Infantry Division, 9th Infantry Division, 30th Infantry Division, 101st Airborne Division, 2nd Armored Division, 3rd Armored Division and 7th Armored Division was awarded the Belgian fourragère on July 13th, 1950 for their action in the Battle of the Bulge.
- On March 30, 1951, the President of the French Republic, Vincent Auriol, pinned not only the Croix de Guerre with Palm but also the Legion of Honour on the flag of the Brigade of Midshipmen of the United States Naval Academy in recognition of historic contributions of the Naval Academy, particularly the contributions of alumni to victory in World War II. The flag of the Brigade of Midshipmen does not display streamers for either award, nor do Midshipmen wear either fourragère, despite apparent entitlement to do both.

=== World War I ===
Unit	Service	Year awarded	Campaign or battle	Other notes
5th Marines; 6th Marines; 5th Machine Gun Battalion	US Marines	1918	Battle of Belleau Wood, Western Front	Awarded the Fourragère aux couleurs de la Croix de guerre with palm leaf three times
9th Infantry Regiment, 2nd Division	US Army	1919	Chateau Thierry, Aisne-Marne, and Meuse-Argonne	French fourragère in the colors of the Croix de Guerre, under General Order No. 156 F, August 29, 1919, GHQ, French Armies of the East.
23rd Infantry Regiment, 2nd Division	US Army	1918	Chateau Thierry, Aisne-Marne, and Meuse-Argonne	434 officers and men were certified to wear the French fourragère as an individual decoration, per the Final Report of the Secretary of War, 1922
2nd Division and its subordinates	US Army	1919	Chateau Thierry, Aisne-Marne, and Meuse-Argonne	Awarded the Fourragère aux couleurs de la Croix de guerre with palm leaf three times
370th Infantry Regiment, 93rd Infantry Division	US Army	1918	Third Battle of the Aisne, Western Front	

=== World War II ===
Unit	Service	Year awarded	Campaign or battle	Other notes
1st Infantry Division	U.S. Army	1944	Normandy	Awarded the Fourragère aux couleurs du ruban de la médaille militaire
16th Infantry, 18th Infantry; 26th Infantry, 5th Field Artillery, 7th Field Artillery Battalion, 1st Engineer Battalion, 1st Signal Company, all of the 1st Infantry Division	U.S. Army	1944	Normandy	Awarded the Fourragère aux couleurs du ruban de la médaille militaire
Division and 1st Brigade, 82nd Airborne Division	U.S. Army	1944	Normandy	Also awarded the Order of William by the Kingdom of the Netherlands for gallantry during Operation Market Garden in 1944
3rd Infantry Division	U.S. Army	1945	Colmar	Awarded the Fourragère aux couleurs de la Croix de guerre
26th Infantry Division	U.S. Army	1944	Lorraine	awarded the Fourragère aux couleurs de la Croix de guerre
79th Infantry Division	U.S. Army	1944	Operation Overlord	Awarded the Fourragère aux couleurs de la Croix de guerre
4th Armored Division	U.S. Army	1944	Normandy	Awarded the Fourragère aux couleurs de la Croix de guerre
478th Amphibious Truck Company Non Divisional	U.S. Army	1944	Operation Overlord	Awarded the Fourragère aux couleurs de la Croix de guerre
30th Infantry Division	U.S. Army	1944	Battle of the Bulge	Awarded the Belgian fourragère and Presidential Unit Citation (Note: Awarded in 2020)
101st Airborne Division	U.S. Army	1944	Battle of the Bulge	Awarded the Belgian fourragère and Presidential Unit Citation
12th Field Artillery Battalion, 99th Infantry Division, 8th Infantry Regiment, 12th Infantry Regiment, 22nd Infantry Regiment, three regiments from the 4th Division	U.S. Army	1944	Battle of the Bulge	Awarded the Belgian fourragère and Presidential Unit Citation
3rd Armored Division	U.S. Army	1944	Battle of the Bulge	Awarded the Belgian fourragère and Presidential Unit Citation
7th Armored Division	U.S. Army	1944	Battle of the Bulge	Awarded the Belgian fourragère and Presidential Unit Citation
9th Military Police Company, 9th Armored Division	U.S. Army	1944	Rhineland Campaign	Awarded the Belgian fourragère
2nd Infantry Division	U.S. Army	1944	Battle of the Bulge	Awarded the Belgian fourragère
4th Infantry Division	U.S. Army	1944	Battle of the Bulge	Awarded the Belgian fourragère
9th Infantry Division	U.S. Army	1944	Battle of the Bulge	Awarded the Belgian fourragère
2nd Armored Division	U.S. Army	1944	Battle of the Bulge	Awarded the Belgian fourragère
Brigade of Midshipmen, United States Naval Academy	U.S. Navy	1951	World War II	Awarded the Croix de Guerre with Palm and the Legion of Honour; despite the entitlement, members of the Brigade do not wear either fourragère.

== Dutch Orange Lanyard ==
The Cabinet of the Netherlands granted the right to wear an Orange Lanyard to individual members of 3 United States Army units who actually participated in the ground operations of Operation Market Garden in 1944: The U.S. 82nd Airborne Division by ministerial decree of 8 October 1945, the U.S. 101st Airborne Division on 20 September 1946 and on 20 April 1982 to glider pilots of the IXth U.S. Air Force Troop Carrier Command who were 'forgotten' in 1945 and 1946. (The Orange Lanyard was not awarded to the 1st Airborne Division (United Kingdom) because the British soldiers were not authorized to wear foreign lanyards).

The Orange Lanyard has nothing to do with the Military Order of William. This persistent misconception among many militaria collectors, primarily in the United States, arises from the fact that the orange fourragere was awarded to individual members of the U.S. 82nd Airborne Division by Ministerial Decree of October 8, 1945, the very same day that the Military Order of William 4th Class (RMWO4) was awarded by Royal Decree (RD) No. 30 to the unit colours of the U.S. 82nd Airborne Division.

== Belgian fourragère ==
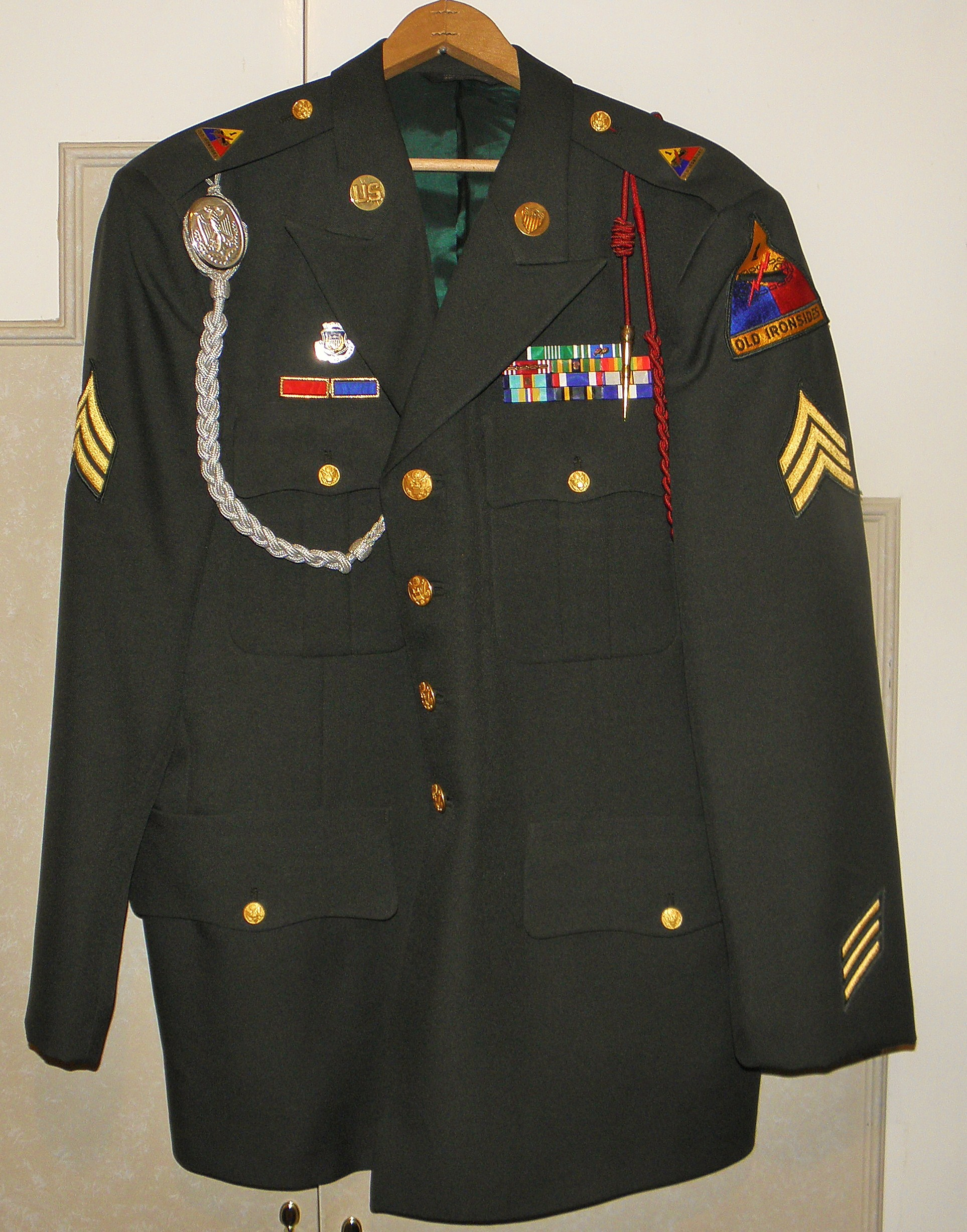
US Army Class A tunic with Belgian fourragère on the left German Armed Forces Badge of Marksmanship (Schützenschnur) worn on the right

The Belgian fourragère of 1940 was created by Prince Charles of Belgium, Regent of the Kingdom to honor certain military formations that distinguished themselves during the Second World War. It consists of three cords terminated by a knot and a metal tag, and is braided in red and green; the colors of the Belgian Croix de guerre of 1940. The fourragère is in cotton for non-commissioned officers and soldiers and in silk for officers.

== Luxembourg fourragère ==
The Luxembourg Army currently awards an orange and blue fourragère.

== Portuguese fourragères ==
Portugal has three fourragères: the War Cross (red and green), the Military Valor Medal (blue and white) and the Order of the Tower and Sword (solid blue).

== South Vietnamese fourragère ==
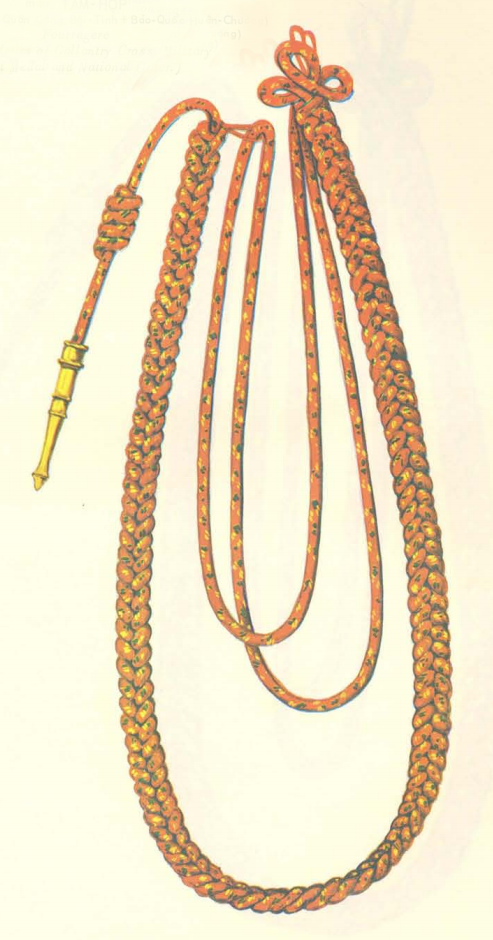
Vietnam fourragère (Mixed colors of Gallantry Cross, Military Merit Medal, and National Order)

The Vietnam Gallantry Cross is the equivalent of the French Croix de Guerre. It was created by Decree No 74-b/Qt dated 15 August 1950 and Decree No 96/DQT/HC dated 2 May 1952. Both individuals (denoted by a star) and formations (denoted by a palm) cited for gallantry were awarded the decoration. Formations that were awarded the Gallantry Cross for two or more occasions were initially authorized to wear a fourragère.

The Vietnam Civil Action is another of the South Vietnamese fourragères. In appearance it resembled the Republic of Vietnam Cross of Gallantry, but rather than yellow and red, it was green and red. Formations that were awarded the medal or emblem for two or more occasions are authorized to wear a fourragère. Many units and individuals were awarded one award, but few were presented with a second award.

== Decorative fourragères ==
Fourragères are often worn as decorative items to liven up ceremonial uniforms in military, police, and cadet organisations. Members of the United States and Canadian 1st Special Service Force wore a red, white, and blue fourragère made out of parachute shroud lines without having earned them in any particular form of military engagement.

== See also ==
- Aiguillette
