= 140th =

140th may refer to:

- 140th (4th London) Brigade, infantry brigade formation of the British Army's Territorial Army that had its origins in a South London Brigade
- 140th Aeromedical Transport Squadron, unit of the Pennsylvania Air National Guard stationed at Harrisburg International Airport, Middletown, Pennsylvania
- 140th Battalion (St. John's Tigers), CEF, unit in the Canadian Expeditionary Force during the First World War
- 140th Belmont Stakes or 2008 Belmont Stakes, the 140th running of the Belmont Stakes
- 140th Delaware General Assembly, meeting of the legislative branch of the state government, consisting of the Delaware Senate and the Delaware House of Representatives
- 140th Division (Imperial Japanese Army) (第140師団, Dai-hyakuyonju Shidan
- 140th Georgia General Assembly succeeded the 139th and served as the precedent for the 141st General Assembly in 1991
- 140th Illinois Volunteer Infantry Regiment, infantry regiment that served in the Union Army during the American Civil War
- 140th Indiana Infantry Regiment served in the Union Army between October 24, 1864, and July 11, 1865, during the American Civil War
- 140th meridian east, line of longitude that extends from the North Pole across Asia, the Pacific Ocean, Australasia, and Antarctica to the South Pole
- 140th meridian west, line of longitude that extends from the North Pole across North America, the Pacific Ocean, the Southern Ocean, and Antarctica to the South Pole
- 140th Military Intelligence Battalion (United States) of the United States Army Reserve
- 140th New York State Legislature met from January 3 to October 2, 1917, during the third year of Charles S. Whitman's governorship, in Albany
- 140th New York Volunteer Infantry Regiment, United States Federal military Regiment mustered 1862 for service in the American Civil War
- 140th Ohio Infantry, infantry regiment in the Union Army during the American Civil War
- 140th Operations Group, unit of the Colorado Air National Guard, stationed at Buckley Space Force Base, Aurora, Colorado
- 140th Pennsylvania Infantry, Union Army regiment in the American Civil War, serving in the Eastern Theater
- 140th pope or Pope John XVII (died 1003), Pope for about seven months from 16 May to 6 November 1003
- 140th Rifle Division (Soviet Union), Red Army rifle division of the Great Patriotic War
- 140th Signal Battalion (United States), field artillery battalion of the Army National Guard
- 140th Street (IRT Ninth Avenue Line), station on the demolished IRT Ninth Avenue Line
- 140th Street (MVTA station), bus rapid transit station along Cedar Avenue in Apple Valley, Minnesota
- 140th Wing, unit of the Colorado Air National Guard, stationed at Buckley Space Force Base, Aurora, Colorado
- 140th Year Anniversary Celebration of the Emancipation Proclamation, national campaign to honor, celebrate, and commemorate January 1, 2003
- Connecticut's 140th assembly district, one of 151 Connecticut House of Representatives districts
- Pennsylvania's 140th Representative District, located in Bucks County

== See also ==
- 140 (disambiguation)
