= Medalha de Mérito Militar =

Medal of Military Merit Medalha de Mérito Militar
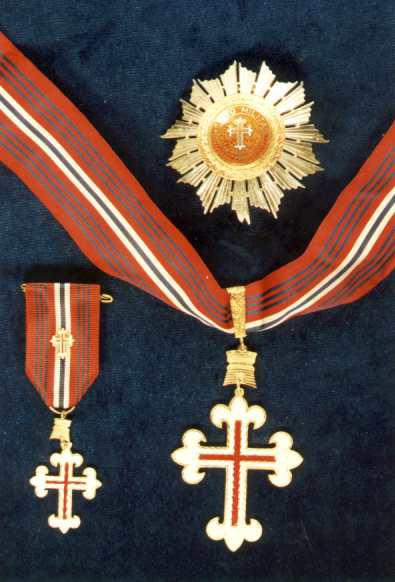

Awarded by Portuguese Republic
- Type: Order
- Established: 1946
- Eligibility: Portuguese and foreign military personnel
- Awarded for: Distinguished exceptional military qualities and virtues.
- Status: Currently constituted

Precedence
- Next (higher): Medalha de Serviços Distintos
- Next (lower): Medalha de Comportamento Exemplar

The Medalha de Mérito Militar (Medal of Military Merit), is a Portuguese military medal created on 28 May 1946. This medal is an award to individuals with exceptional military qualities and virtues. The 'Military Merit Medal' may also be awarded to foreign military personnel.

== Classes ==
The medal of military merit comprises:

- The Grand Cross of the Military Merit Medal (GCMM) that can only be awarded to General Officers;
1. Medal for Military Merit (Grand Cross) (GCMM) (Note: Portuguese: Medalha de Mérito Militar - Grã-Cruz – Awarded to members of the military of the following ranks: General officer) - General Officers only
- The remaining classes of the military merit medal may be awarded to military personnel who hold the following rank or rank:
1. Medal for Military Merit (Class 1) (MPMM) (Note: Portuguese: Medalha de Mérito Militar – Awarded to members of the military of the following ranks: General officer, colonel or sea captain) - General officer, colonel or sea captain;
2. Medal for Military Merit (Class 2) (MSMM) (Note: Portuguese: Medalha de Mérito Militar – Awarded to members of the military of the following ranks: Lieutenant colonel, captain of frigate, major or captain-lieutenant) - Lieutenant colonel, captain of frigate, major or captain-lieutenant;
3. Medal for Military Merit (Class 3) (MTMM) (Note: Portuguese: Medalha de Mérito Militar – Awarded to members of the military of the following ranks: Captain, first lieutenant, other officers of lower rank and sergeant-major) - Captain, first lieutenant, other officers of lower rank and sergeant-major;
4. Medal for Military Merit (Class 4) (MQMM) (Note: Portuguese: Medalha de Mérito Militar – Awarded to members of the military of the following ranks: Other sergeants and enlisted ranks) - Other sergeants and enlisted ranks.

== See also ==
- Honorific orders of Portugal
