= 101st Military Intelligence Battalion =

101st Military Intelligence CEWI
- Active: 1980 to 1995, 1996 to 2006
- Country: United States
- Branch: U.S. Army
- Type: Battalion
- Role: Intelligence, Surveillance and Communications
- Mottos: "Trust, Vigilance, Loyalty"
- Engagements: Operation Desert Storm

Insignia
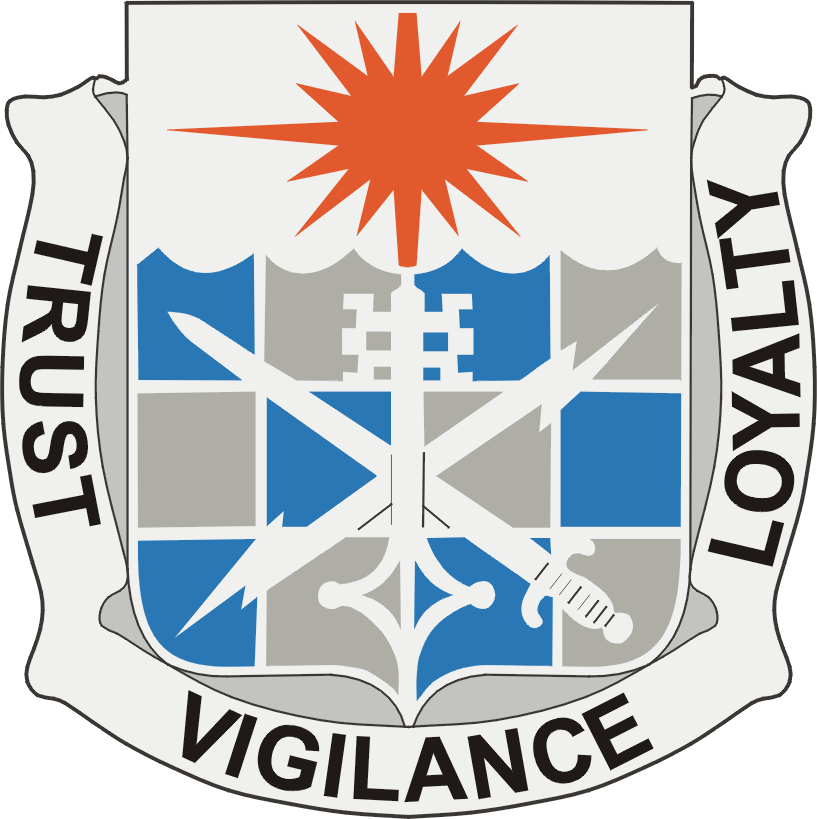
- 101st Military Intelligence emblem

The 101st Military Intelligence Battalion (CEWI - Combat Electronic Warfare Intelligence) was part of the 1st Infantry Division, Fort Riley, Kansas from 1980 to 1995. 1988 was most notable as members participated in REFORGER 1988 (Return of Forces to Germany), the largest NATO ground maneuver since the end of World War II. The group headed to the border between Czechoslovakia and Germany during the Cold War to deter communist regime expansion.

The unit is noted for extraordinary heroism during ground combat operations in Operation Desert Storm from 24 February 1991 through 4 March 1991 under Task Force 3/37th Armor.

According to the 101st Military Battalion Lineage and Honors Information page at The U.S. Army Center of Military History Web site, the 101st Military Battalion was inactivated on 15 November 1995 at Fort Riley, Kansas, but was subsequently reactivated on 15 February 1996 in Germany.

On 9 June 2006, the Battalion was inactivated in a casing of the colors ceremony held at Leighton Barracks, Wuerzburg, Germany.
