= Estado Novo (Portugal) =

1933–1974 authoritarian regime in Portugal

Portuguese Republic República Portuguesa
- 1933–1974
- Flag Coat of arms
- Motto: Deus, Pátria e Familia ("God, Fatherland and Family")
- Anthem: A Portuguesa "The Portuguese"
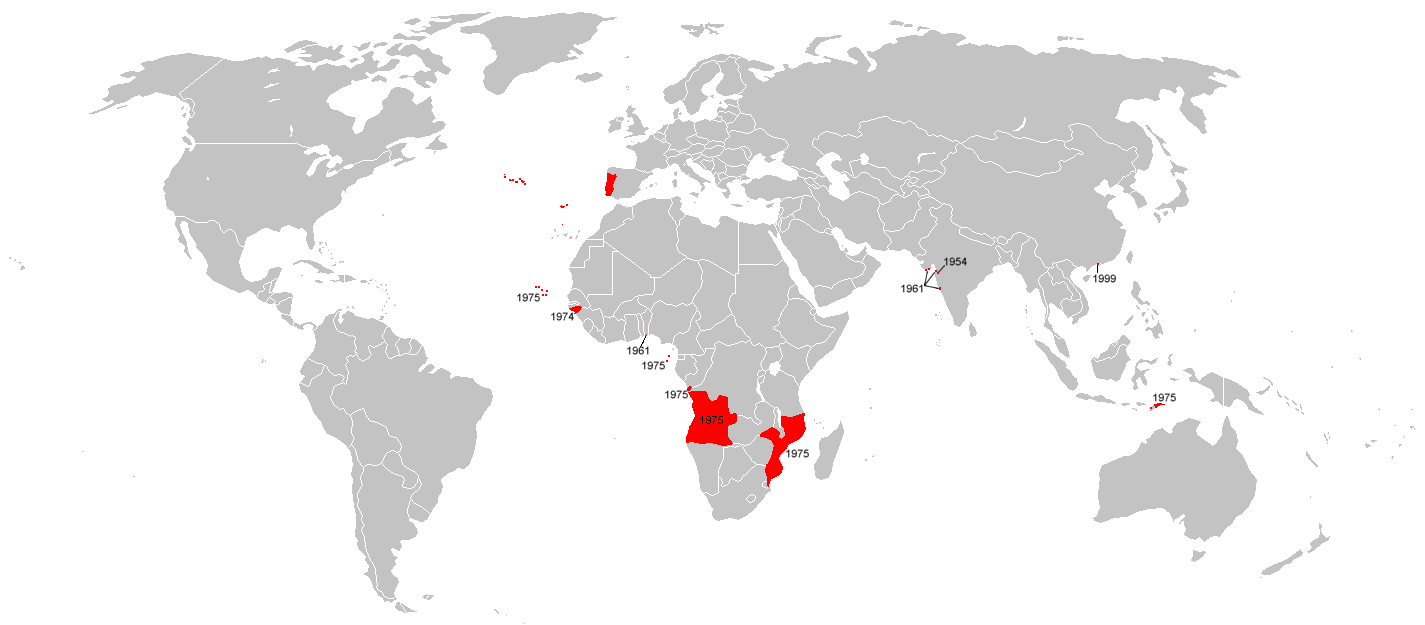
- The Portuguese Empire during the 20th century
- Capital and largest city: Lisbon; 38°42′46″N 9°9′19″W
- Official language: Portuguese
- Religion: Roman Catholicism (majority) (Note: The regime closely aligned itself with the Catholic Church, but never officially reversed the first republic's separation of church and state.)
- Demonym: Portuguese
- Government: Presidential republic (Note: Though Salazar controlled the country as Prime Minister by convention, he was technically subordinated to the President under the constitution of 1933, which gave the President sweeping executive powers and allowed them to dismiss the Prime Minister at will. From 1959 onwards, the president was elected by the National Assembly instead of by popular vote, thus making the regime a de facto assembly-independent republic; however, no change to the 1933 constitution seems to have been made, meaning that, de jure, the country continued to operate under a presidential system.) under a corporatist dictatorship
- President
  - 1926–1951: Óscar Carmona
  - 1951–1958: Francisco Craveiro Lopes
  - 1958–1974: Américo Tomás
- Prime Minister
  - 1932–1968: António de Oliveira Salazar
  - 1968–1974: Marcelo Caetano
- Legislature
  - Consultative chamber: Corporative Chamber
  - Legislative chamber: National Assembly
- Historical era: Interwar period; World War II; Cold War
  - Constitutional referendum: 19 March 1933
  - Established: 11 April 1933
  - Carnation Revolution: 25 April 1974

Area
  - Total: 92,212 km^{2} (35,603 sq mi)

Population
  - 1970: 8,663,000 (Metropole)
- GDP (nominal): 1970 estimate
  - Total: ▲$15.888 billion
  - Per capita: ▲$648
- HDI (1970): 0.653 medium
- Currency: Portuguese escudo
Preceded by	Succeeded by
Ditadura Nacional	National Salvation Junta

The Estado Novo (European Portuguese pronunciation: [(ɨ)ʃˈtaðu ˈnovu], lit. 'New State') was the corporatist Portuguese state installed in 1933. It evolved from the Ditadura Nacional ("National Dictatorship") formed after the coup d'état of 28 May 1926 against the unstable First Republic. Together, the Ditadura Nacional and the Estado Novo are recognised by historians as the Second Portuguese Republic (Portuguese: Segunda República Portuguesa). The Estado Novo, greatly inspired by conservative and autocratic ideologies, (Note: Despite that, there have been cases of government cover-ups of child sexual abuse by senior government officials, most notably the Ballet Rose scandal, that puts into question the extent to which this conservative state ideology was truly followed.) was developed by António de Oliveira Salazar, who was President of the Council of Ministers from 1932 until illness forced him out of office in 1968.

Opposed to democracy, communism, socialism, syndicalism, anarchism, liberalism and anti-colonialism, the regime was conservative, corporatist, and nationalist in nature. Its policy envisaged the perpetuation of Portugal as a pluricontinental nation under the doctrine of lusotropicalism, with Angola, Mozambique, and other Portuguese territories as extensions of Portugal itself. Under the Estado Novo, Portugal tried to perpetuate a vast, centuries-old empire with a total area of 2,168,071 square kilometres (837,097 mi^{2}), while other former colonial powers had, by this time, largely acceded to global calls for self-determination and independence of their overseas colonies.

The years between the conclusion of World War II and 1973 represented the bloodiest period for Portugal in the twentieth century as a consequence of the Portuguese Colonial War, with more than 100,000 civilian deaths and more than 10,000 soldier deaths in a war that lasted 13 years.

Under the Estado Novo, Portugal pursued economic policies aligned with those of the Western Bloc. The first steps toward economic integration began in 1948 when Portugal joined the Marshall Plan, and subsequently became a founding member of the Organisation for European Economic Co-operation (OEEC). In 1960, Portugal joined the European Free Trade Association (EFTA), which allowed the country to integrate its industries with European markets while protecting its agriculture and fisheries, where it could not compete with Northern European nations. Portugal also expanded its economic ties globally by joining the General Agreement on Tariffs and Trade (GATT) in 1962. Under Marcelo Caetano, who replaced an ageing Salazar as prime minister in 1968, the country continued to liberalise its economy and advance European integration. This effort culminated in the signing of a free trade agreement with the European Economic Community (EEC) in 1972. When Portugal, under the Third Portuguese Republic, finally joined the EEC in 1986, most trade barriers with the rest of Western Europe had already been dismantled by the Estado Novo, with the exception of those relating to agricultural goods and fisheries and, more importantly, trade with Spain.

On the political front, Portugal was a founding member of the North Atlantic Treaty Organization (NATO) in 1949, and joined the United Nations (UN) in 1955. From 1950 until 1970, Portugal saw its GDP per capita increase at an annual average rate of 5.7%, leading to significant economic convergence with wealthier Western European nations. Despite this economic growth, by the fall of the Estado Novo in 1974, Portugal still had the lowest per capita income and the lowest literacy rate in Western Europe. However, this economic convergence slowed or even reversed after the end of the Estado Novo, as political and economic instability in the post-1974 period hampered further progress. On 25 April 1974, the Carnation Revolution in Lisbon, a military coup organised by left-wing Portuguese military officers of the Armed Forces Movement (MFA)—led to the end of the Estado Novo.

== Prelude ==
King Carlos I of Portugal confirmed colonial treaties of the 19th century that stabilised the situation in Portuguese Africa. These agreements were, however, unpopular in Portugal, where they were seen as being to the disadvantage of the country. In addition, Portugal was declared bankrupt twice – first on 14 June 1892 and again on 10 May 1902 – causing industrial disturbances, socialist and republican antagonism, and press criticism of the monarchy. Carlos responded by appointing João Franco as prime minister and subsequently accepting parliament's dissolution. In 1908, Carlos I was assassinated in Lisbon by anti-monarchists. The Portuguese monarchy lasted until 1910 when, through the 5 October revolution, it was overthrown and Portugal was proclaimed a republic. The overthrow of the Portuguese monarchy in 1910 led to a 16-year struggle to sustain parliamentary democracy under republicanism – the Portuguese First Republic (1910–1926).

The 28 May 1926 coup d'état or, during the period of Estado Novo, the National Revolution (Portuguese: Revolução Nacional), was a military action that put an end to the chaotic Portuguese First Republic and initiated the Ditadura Militar (Military Dictatorship) which in 1928 transitioned into the Ditadura Nacional (National Dictatorship). Salazar became prime minister in 1932, and in 1933 renamed it the Estado Novo (New State), defining Portugal as a corporative, single-party and multi-continental country.

With fascist organisations being popular and widely supported across many countries (like Italian Fascism and National Socialism) as an antagonist of communist ideologies, António de Oliveira Salazar developed the Estado Novo as an alternative: a conservative authoritarian regime that was neither fascist nor totalitarian. Salazar's regime can be described as a syncretic and corporatist government; Portuguese historian Ernesto C. Leal described the ideology of Salazar and his state as a combination of anti-liberalism, conservatism and authoritarian nationalism that featured social corporatism and Catholic corporatism. The basis of Salazar's regime was a platform of stability, in direct contrast to the unstable environment of the First Republic.

According to some Portuguese scholars like Jaime Nogueira Pinto and Rui Ramos, his early reforms and policies changed the whole nation by permitting political and financial stability and therefore a calm social order and economic growth, after the politically unstable and financially chaotic years of the Portuguese First Republic (1910–1926). Following the First Republic, when not even public order had been achieved, this looked like an impressive breakthrough to most of the population; at this point, Salazar achieved the height of his popularity. This transformation of Portugal was then known as A Lição de Salazar – "Salazar's Lesson". Salazar's program was opposed to communism, socialism, and liberalism. It was pro-Catholic, conservative, and nationalistic. Its policy envisaged the perpetuation of Portugal as a pluricontinental empire, financially autonomous and politically independent from the dominating superpowers, and a source of civilisation and stability to the overseas societies in the African and Asian possessions.

To support his colonial policies, Salazar eventually adopted Brazilian historian Gilberto Freyre's notion of lusotropicalism by asserting that, since Portugal had been a multicultural, multiracial, and pluricontinental nation since the 15th century, losing its overseas territories in Africa and Asia would dismember the country and end Portuguese independence. In geopolitical terms, losing these territories would decrease the Portuguese state's self-sufficiency.

Throughout the 1930s and 1940s, Salazar had strongly resisted Freyre's ideas, partly because Freyre claimed the Portuguese were more prone than other European nations to miscegenation. Salazar adopted lusotropicalism only after sponsoring Freyre on a visit to Portugal and some of its overseas territories in 1951 and 1952. Freyre's work, Aventura e Rotina (Adventure and Routine) resulted from this visit.

Under the Estado Novo regime, Portugal's most notable sports star, Eusébio da Silva Ferreira, and the most decorated military officer of the Portuguese Armed Forces, Marcelino da Mata, were both black Portuguese citizens born and raised in Portugal's African territories.

== Regime ==
The Estado Novo based its political philosophy around a close interpretation of the Catholic social doctrine, much like the regime of Engelbert Dollfuss in Austria founded around the same time. The economic system, known as corporatism, was based on similar interpretations of the papal encyclicals Rerum novarum (Leo XIII, 1891) and Quadragesimo anno (Pius XI, 1931), which were meant to prevent class struggle and transform economic concerns secondary to social values. Rerum novarum argued that labour associations were part of the natural order, like the family. The right of men to organise into trade unions and to engage in labour activities was thus inherent and could not be denied by employers or the state. Quadragesimo anno provided the blueprint for the erection of the corporatist system.

A new constitution was drafted by a group of lawyers, businessmen, clerics, and university professors, with Salazar as the leading spirit and Marcelo Caetano also playing a major role. The constitution created the Estado Novo ('New State'), in theory a corporatist state representing interest groups rather than individuals. The leaders wanted a system in which the people would be represented through corporations, rather than through divisive parties, and where national interest was given priority over sectional claims. Salazar thought that the party system had failed irretrievably in Portugal.

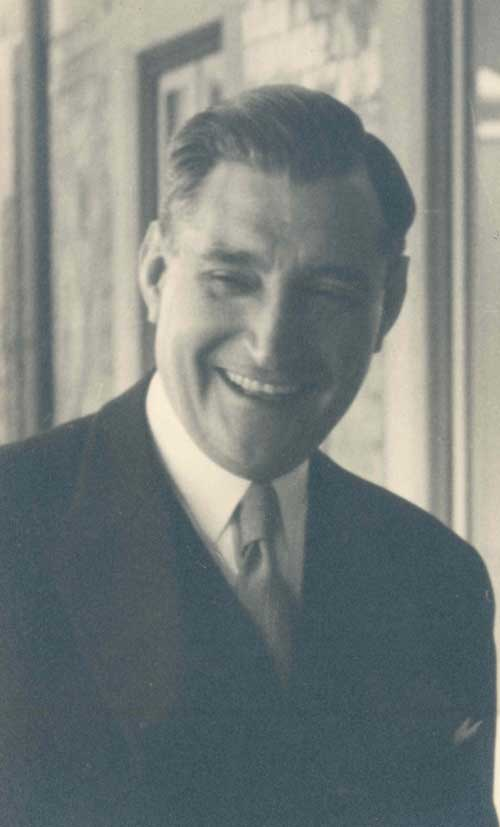
António de Oliveira Salazar, aged 50, in 1939

Unlike Mussolini or Hitler, Salazar never had the intention to create a party-state. Salazar was against the whole-party concept, he rejected the concept of a mass-mobilizing party that sought to control all aspects of life, as seen in fascist regimes and in 1930 he created the National Union, a single-party, but he created it as a non-ideological, non-party, a passive institution, serving more as a facade of political order rather than a power-holding organisation in its own right. The National Union was set up to control and restrain public opinion rather than to mobilise it; the goal was to strengthen and preserve traditional values rather than to induce a new social order. Ministers, diplomats, and civil servants were never compelled to join the National Union.

According to Howard Wiarda, "The men who came to power in the Estado Novo were genuinely concerned with the poverty and backwardness of their nation, divorcing themselves from Anglo-American political influences while developing a new indigenous political model and alleviating the miserable living conditions of both rural and urban poor."

The new constitution introduced by Salazar established an anti-parliamentarian and authoritarian government that would last until 1974. Executive authority was vested in a president elected by popular vote for a period of seven years, with no term limits. The president was assisted by a prime minister and cabinet. On paper, the new document vested sweeping powers in the hands of the president, including the power to appoint and dismiss the prime minister. On paper, the president was a virtual dictator. The president was elevated to a position of preeminence as the "balance wheel", the defender and ultimate arbiter of national politics. (Note: According to a dispatch from the British Embassy in Lisbon of that time: "Generally speaking, this novel constitution is receiving the marked approval which it deserves. It has a certain Fascist quality in its theory of 'corporations', which is a reversion to medieval from the 18th-century doctrines. But this quality, unsuited to our Anglo-Saxon tradition, is not out of place in a country which has hitherto founded its democracy on French philosophy and found it unsuited to the national temperament." The British Embassy also pointed out that Portugal's illiteracy made elections difficult and illusory.) President Carmona, however, had allowed Salazar more or less a free hand since appointing him prime minister and continued to do so. Carmona and his successors would largely be figureheads for Salazar, to the point that the president's nominal prerogative to dismiss Salazar was the only check on his power.

The legislature, called the National Assembly, was restricted to members of the National Union. It could initiate legislation, but only concerning matters that did not require government expenditures. The parallel Corporative Chamber included representatives of municipalities, religious, cultural, and professional groups, and of the official workers' syndicates that replaced free trade unions.

The corporatist constitution was approved in the national Portuguese constitutional referendum of 19 March 1933. A draft had been published one year before, and the public was invited to state any objections in the press. These tended to stay in the realm of generalities and only a handful of people, less than 6,000, voted against the new constitution. The new constitution was approved with 99.5% of the vote, but with 488,840 abstentions (in a registered electorate of 1,330,258) counting as "yes". Hugh Kay points out that the large number of abstentions might be attributable to the fact that voters were presented with a package deal to which they had to say "yes" or "no" with no opportunity to accept one clause and reject another. In this referendum, women were allowed to vote for the first time in Portugal. Their right to vote had not been obtained during the First Republic, despite feminist efforts, and even in the referendum vote, secondary education was a requirement for female voters, whereas males only needed to be able to read and write. The right for women to vote was later broadened twice under the Estado Novo. The first time was in 1946 and the second time in 1968 under Marcelo Caetano, law 2137 proclaimed the equality of men and women for electoral purposes. The 1968 electoral law did not make any distinction between men and women.

The year 1933 marked a watershed of legislation in Portuguese history. Under Salazar's supervision, Teotónio Pereira, the Sub-Secretary of State of Corporations and Social Welfare, reporting directly to Salazar, enacted extensive legislation that shaped the corporatist structure and initiated a comprehensive social welfare system. This system was equally anti-capitalist and anti-socialist. The corporatisation of the working class was accompanied by strict legislation regulating business. Workers' organisations were subordinated to state control but granted a legitimacy that they had never before enjoyed and were made beneficiaries of a variety of new social programs. Nevertheless, even in the enthusiastic early years, corporatist agencies were not at the center of power and therefore corporatism was not the true base of the whole system.

In 1934, Salazar suppressed the National Syndicalist Movement, also known as the camisas azuis ("Blue Shirts") and exiled their leader Francisco Rolão Preto. Salazar denounced the National Syndicalists as "inspired by certain foreign models" and condemned their "exaltation of youth, the cult of force through direct action, the principle of the superiority of state political power in social life, and the propensity for organizing masses behind a single leader". Despite this, Salazar gave National Syndicalists the opportunity to join the National Union or its youth movement. Salazar's own party, the National Union, was formed as a subservient umbrella organisation to support the regime itself, and therefore did not have its own philosophy. At the time, many European countries feared the advance of communist ideology. Many members of the National Syndicalist Movement eventually joined the National Union. One overriding criticism of his regime is that stability was bought and maintained at the expense of suppression of human rights and liberties.

According to Marcello Caetano, the Estado Novo's corporatism also took inspiration from Italian fascism. In 1935, the regime established the National Foundation for Joy in Labor (FNAT), which took inspiration from the Kraft durch Freude in Germany and the Opera Nazionale Dopolavoro in Italy. Salazar admired Mussolini and was influenced by his Labour Charter of 1927, but also claimed that fascist dictatorship was a pagan Caesarist political system that recognised neither legal nor moral limits.

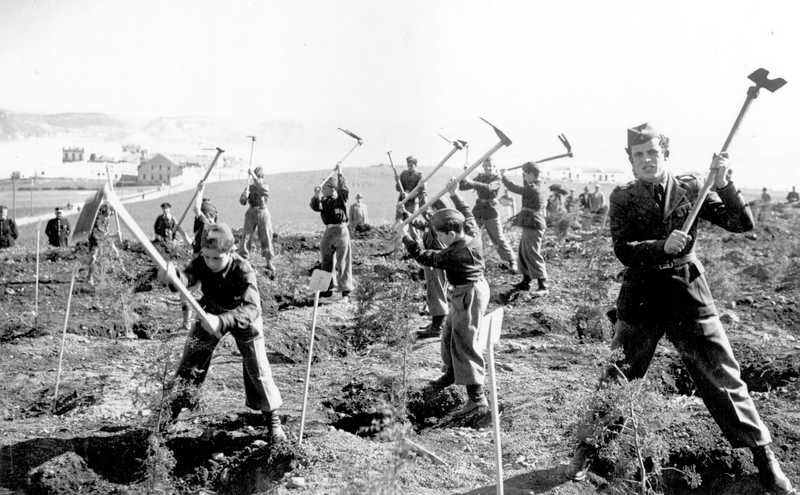
Mocidade Portuguesa (Portuguese Youth) members working in the Monsanto Forest Park, Lisbon, c. 1938

Salazar also viewed German Nazism as espousing pagan elements that he considered repugnant. Just before World War II, Salazar made this declaration: "We are opposed to all forms of Internationalism, Communism, Socialism, Syndicalism and everything that may divide or minimize, or break up the family. We are against class warfare, irreligion and disloyalty to one's country; against serfdom, a materialistic conception of life, and might over right." however the Estado Novo adopted many fascist characteristics with the Legião Portuguesa, Mocidade Portuguesa, and Corporatism being the most prominent examples; after the end of World War II, Salazar distanced his regime from fascism.

=== World War II ===
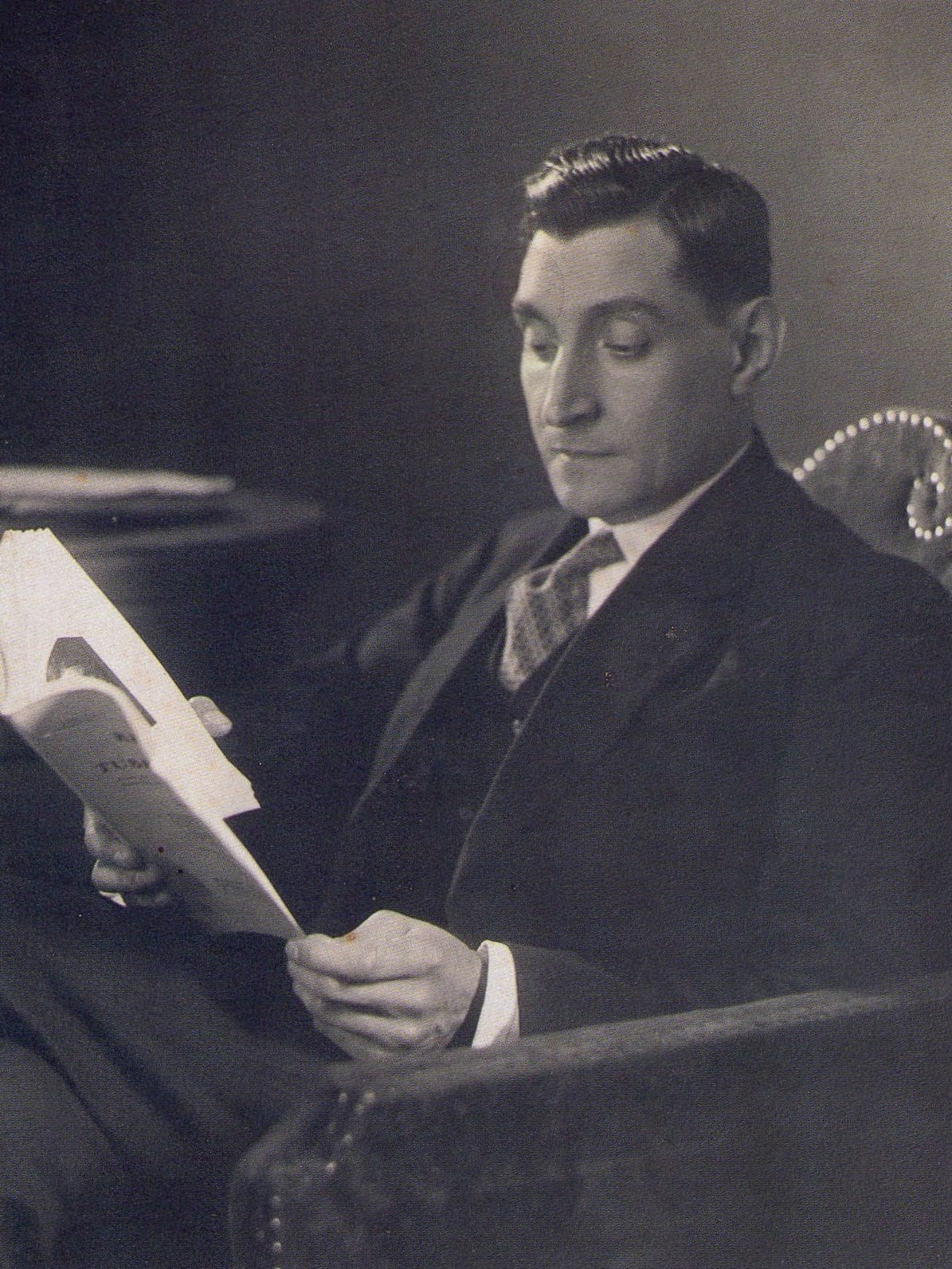
António de Oliveira Salazar in 1940

Portugal was officially neutral in the Spanish Civil War (1936–1939), but quietly furnished help to the nationalists of Francisco Franco. During World War II, 1939–1945, Portugal remained neutral, giving its highest priority to avoiding a Nazi invasion of the sort that was so devastating in most other European countries. Churchill in 1940, initially thanked the Portuguese for their neutrality and keeping war off the Iberian peninsula. However, the regime showed some pro-Axis sympathies; such as Salazar expressing approval for the German invasion of the Soviet Union. From 1943, Portugal favoured the Allies, leasing air bases in the Azores.

Portugal leased the Azores as a result of being threatened with invasion should Portugal not cater to the requests of the Allies. As an official neutral, Portugal traded with both sides. It cut off vital shipments of tungsten and rubber to Germany in 1944, after pressure from the Allies. Lisbon was the base for International Red Cross operations aiding Allied POWs and was the main air transit point between Britain and the US.

In 1942, Australian forces briefly occupied Portuguese Timor but were soon overwhelmed by the Japanese. Salazar worked to regain control of East Timor, which came about after the Japanese surrender in 1945. In 1945, Portugal declared three days of national mourning for death of Adolf Hitler, which drew criticism from internal opponents.

=== Post-World War II ===
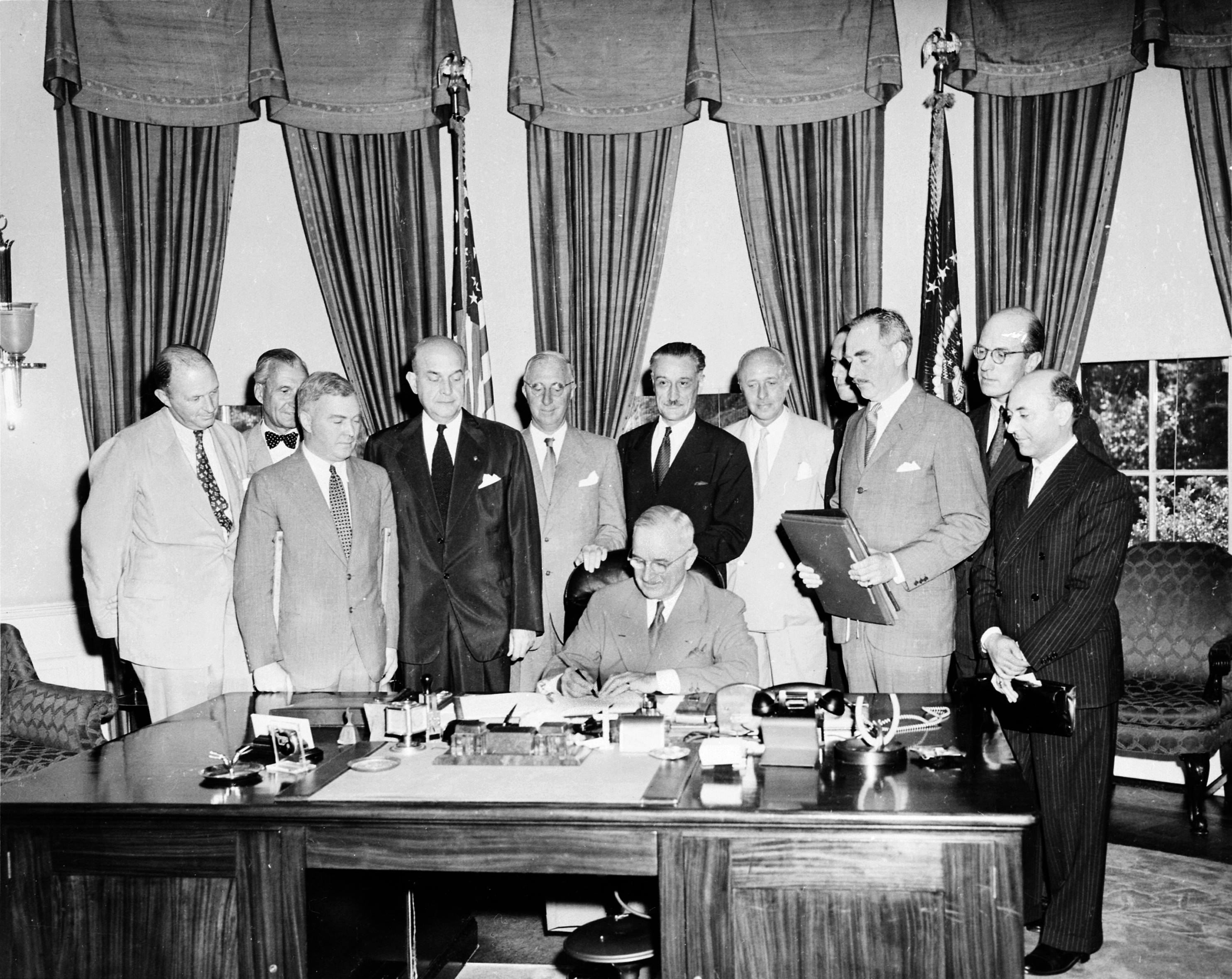
President Truman signing the North Atlantic Treaty with Portuguese ambassador Teotónio Pereira standing behind

After World War II (1939–1945), however, the corporatist economic model was less and less applicable. And after decolonisation in the 1950s and 1960s, the Portuguese regime became also a source of criticism and dissent by most of the international community. Nevertheless, Salazar clung to it, thereby slowing the nation's long-term economic development. Salazar's postwar policy allowed some liberalisation in politics, in terms of organised opposition with more freedom of the press. Opposition parties were tolerated to an extent, but they were also controlled, limited, and manipulated, with the result that they split into factions and never formed a united opposition. He permitted the formation of Movement of Democratic Unity (Movimento de Unidade Democrática) in 1945. It boycotted the election and Salazar won handily on 18 November 1945. In 1949 Portugal became a founding member of NATO.

President Óscar Carmona died in 1951 after 25 years in office and was succeeded by Francisco Craveiro Lopes. However, Lopes was not willing to give Salazar the free hand that Carmona had given him, and was forced to resign just before the end of his term in 1958.

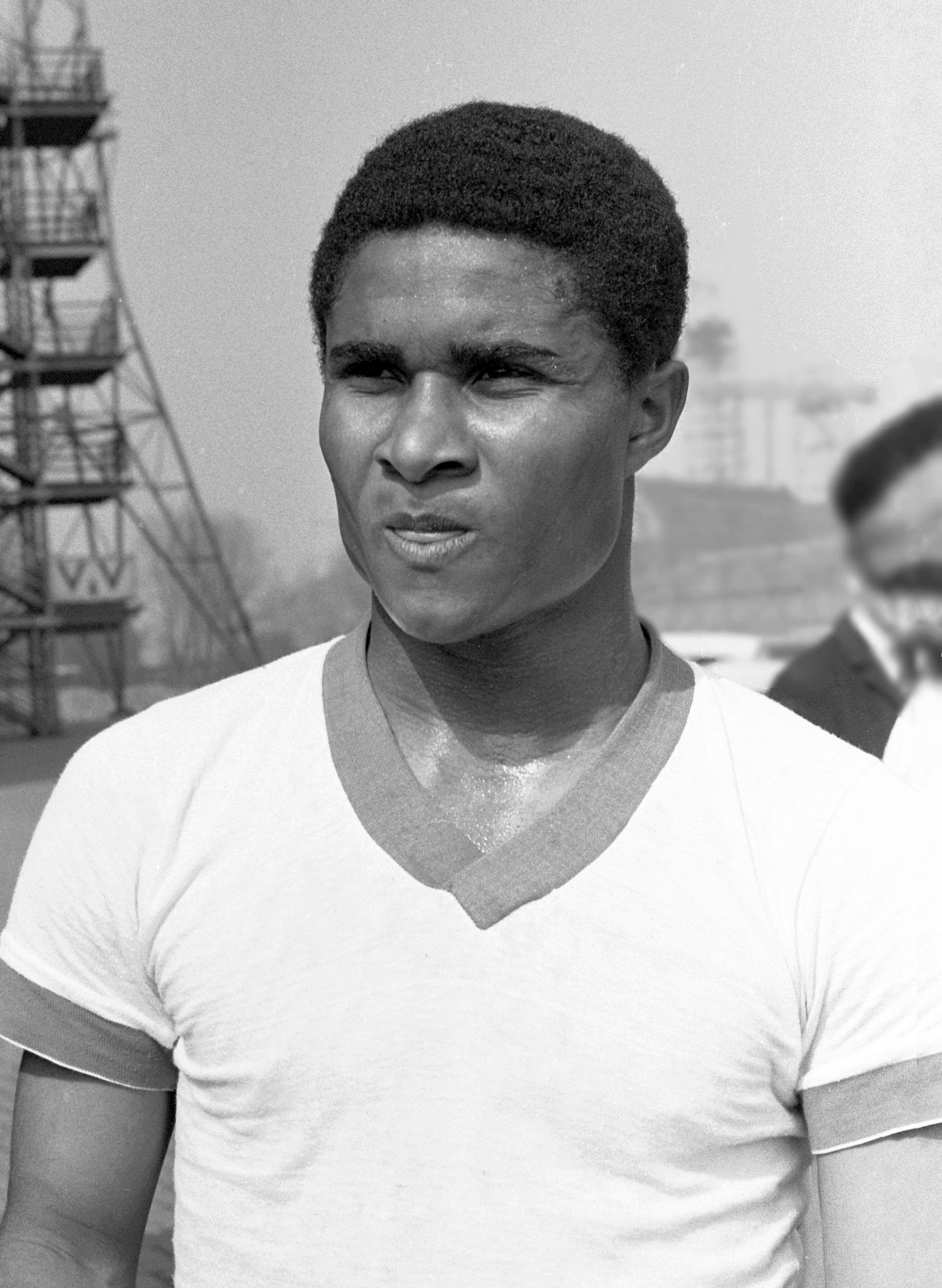
Eusébio da Silva Ferreira, a man born in Portuguese Mozambique who graduated as a footballer and played for Sporting Clube de Lourenço Marques at both youth level and the main squad between the ages of 15 and 18, became the most famous Portuguese sports star during the Estado Novo.

Naval Minister Américo Tomás, a staunch conservative, ran in the 1958 elections as the official candidate. General Humberto Delgado was the opposition candidate—the only time in both incarnations of the Second Republic that an opposition candidate was still in the race on election day. Delgado was credited with only around 25% of the votes with 52.6% in favour of Tomás. The election had initially been seen as little better than a pantomime of democracy before a reporter asked Delgado whether he would retain Salazar if elected. Delgado famously replied, "Obviamente, demito-o!" ("Obviously, I'll sack him!") He was well aware that the president's ability to dismiss the prime minister was, on paper, the only check on Salazar's power. Delgado's rallies subsequently attracted vast crowds. Evidence later surfaced that the PIDE had stuffed the ballot boxes with votes for Tomás, leading many neutral observers to conclude that Delgado would have won had Salazar allowed an honest election.

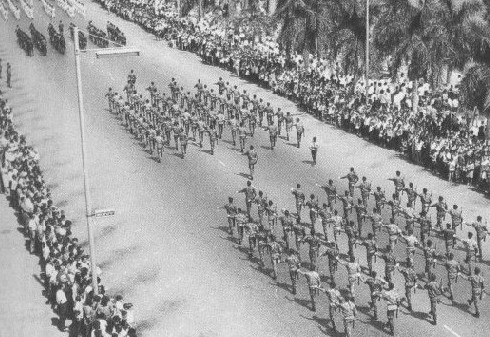
Portuguese Armed Forces marching in Luanda, at the time the capital city of the Portuguese Overseas Province of Angola, during the Portuguese Colonial War (1961–1974)

After the elections, Delgado was expelled from the Portuguese military and took refuge in the Brazilian embassy before going into exile, spending much of it in Brazil and later in Algeria. Even though the electoral system was so heavily rigged in favour of the National Union that Tomás could not have possibly been defeated, Salazar was not willing to leave anything to chance. He abolished the direct election of presidents in favour of indirect election by the National Assembly—which was firmly controlled by the regime—serving as an electoral college.

On 23 January 1961, military officer and politician Henrique Galvão led the hijacking of the Portuguese passenger ship Santa Maria. The terrorist operation was successful as anti-regime propaganda but killed one man in the process. Galvão claimed that his intentions were to sail to the Overseas Province of Angola to set up a renegade Portuguese government in opposition to Salazar in Luanda. Galvão released the passengers in negotiation with Brazilian officials in exchange for political asylum in Brazil. Later that year hijackers forced an aircraft to circle Lisbon to drop leaflets against the dictatorship. After that, the six hijackers forced the crew to fly them back to Morocco.

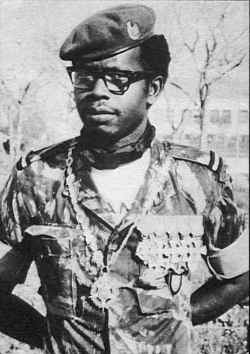
Marcelino da Mata, 1969. He became the most decorated Portuguese military officer in the history of the Portuguese Army.

In 1962, the Academic Crisis occurred. The regime, fearing the growing popularity of both purely democratic and communist ideas among the students, carried out the boycott and closure of several student associations and organisations, including the important National Secretariat of Portuguese Students. Most members of this organisation were opposition militants, among them many communists. Anti-regime political activists were investigated and persecuted by PIDE-DGS (the secret police), and according to the gravity of the offence, were usually sent to jail or transferred from one university to another in order to destabilise oppositionist networks and their hierarchical organisation. The students, with strong support from the clandestine Portuguese Communist Party, responded with demonstrations which culminated on 24 March with a huge student demonstration in Lisbon, which was vigorously suppressed by the riot police. Marcelo Caetano, a distinguished member of the regime and the incumbent rector of the University of Lisbon, resigned.

The reluctance of many young men to embrace the hardships of the Portuguese Colonial War resulted in tens of thousands of Portuguese citizens each year leaving to seek economic opportunities abroad in order to escape conscription. In over 15 years, nearly one million emigrated to France, another million to the United States, many hundreds of thousands to Germany, Switzerland, the United Kingdom, Luxembourg, Venezuela, or Brazil. Political parties, such as the Socialist Party, persecuted at home, were established in exile. The only party which managed to continue (illegally) operating in Portugal during all the dictatorship was the Portuguese Communist Party.

In 1964, Delgado founded the Portuguese National Liberation Front in Rome, stating in public that the only way to end the Estado Novo would be by a military coup, while many others advocated a "national uprising" approach.

Delgado and his Brazilian secretary, Arajaryr Moreira de Campos, were murdered on 13 February 1965 in Spain in an ambush by PIDE.

According to some Portuguese right-wing scholars like Jaime Nogueira Pinto and Rui Ramos, Salazar's early reforms and policies allowed political and financial stability and therefore social order and economic growth, after the politically unstable and financially chaotic years of the Portuguese First Republic (1910–1926). Other historians, like left-wing politician Fernando Rosas, point out that Salazar's policies from the 1930s to the 1950s, led to economic and social stagnation and rampant emigration, turning Portugal into one of the poorest countries in Europe, that was also thwarted by scoring lower on literacy than its peers of the Northern Hemisphere.

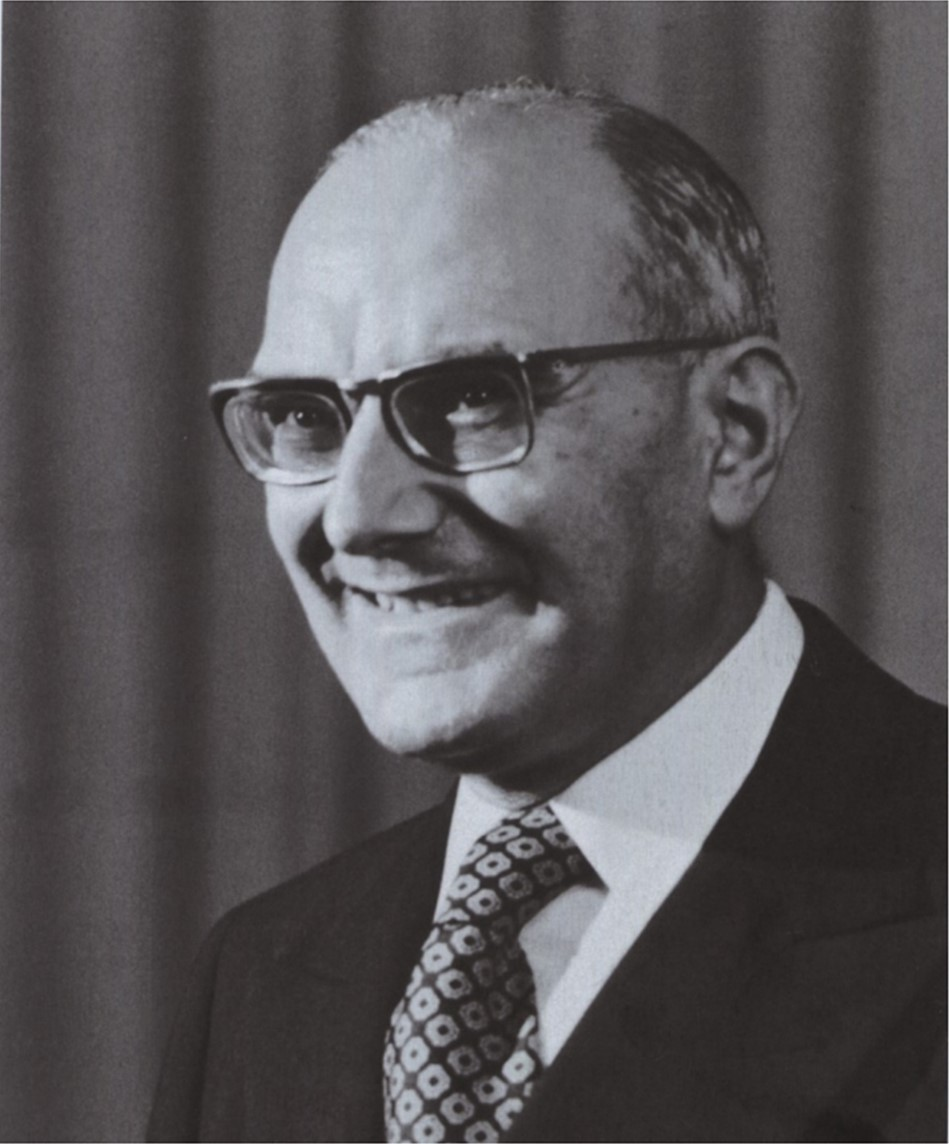
After Salazar's resignation due to illness in 1968, Marcelo Caetano became the leader of the country and its Estado Novo regime.

Salazar suffered a stroke in 1968. As it was thought that he did not have long to live, Tomás replaced him with Marcelo Caetano, former rector of the University of Lisbon and prominent scholar of its law school, and despite his protest resignation in 1962, a supporter of the regime. Salazar was never informed of this decision, and reportedly died in 1970 still believing he was prime minister. Most of the people hoped Caetano would soften the edges of Salazar's authoritarian regime and modernise the already growing economy. Caetano moved on to foster economic growth and made important social improvements, such as the awarding of a monthly pension to rural workers who had never had the chance to pay social security. Some large-scale investments were made at the national level, such as the building of a major oil processing center in Sines. The economy reacted very well at first, but into the 1970s some serious problems began to show, due in part to two-digit inflation (from 1970 and on) and to the effects of the 1973 oil crisis.

However, the 1973 oil crisis had a potentially beneficial effect on Portugal because the largely unexploited oil reserves that Portugal had in its overseas territories of Angola and São Tomé and Príncipe were being developed at a fast pace. Although Caetano was fundamentally authoritarian, he did make some efforts to open up the regime. Soon after taking power, he rebranded the regime as the "Social State", and slightly increased freedom of speech and the press. These measures did not go nearly far enough for a significant element of the population. The people were also disappointed that Caetano was unwilling to open up the electoral system. The conduct of the 1969 and 1973 elections was little different from past elections over the previous four decades. The National Union—renamed People's National Action—swept every seat, as before. Also as before, the opposition was still barely tolerated; opposition candidates were subjected to harsh repression. However, Caetano had to expend all of his political capital to wring even these meagre reforms out of the hardliners in the regime—most notably Tomás, who was not nearly as willing to give Caetano the free rein that he gave Salazar. Caetano was thus in no position to resist when Tomás and the other hardliners forced the end of the reform experiment in 1973.

== Economy ==
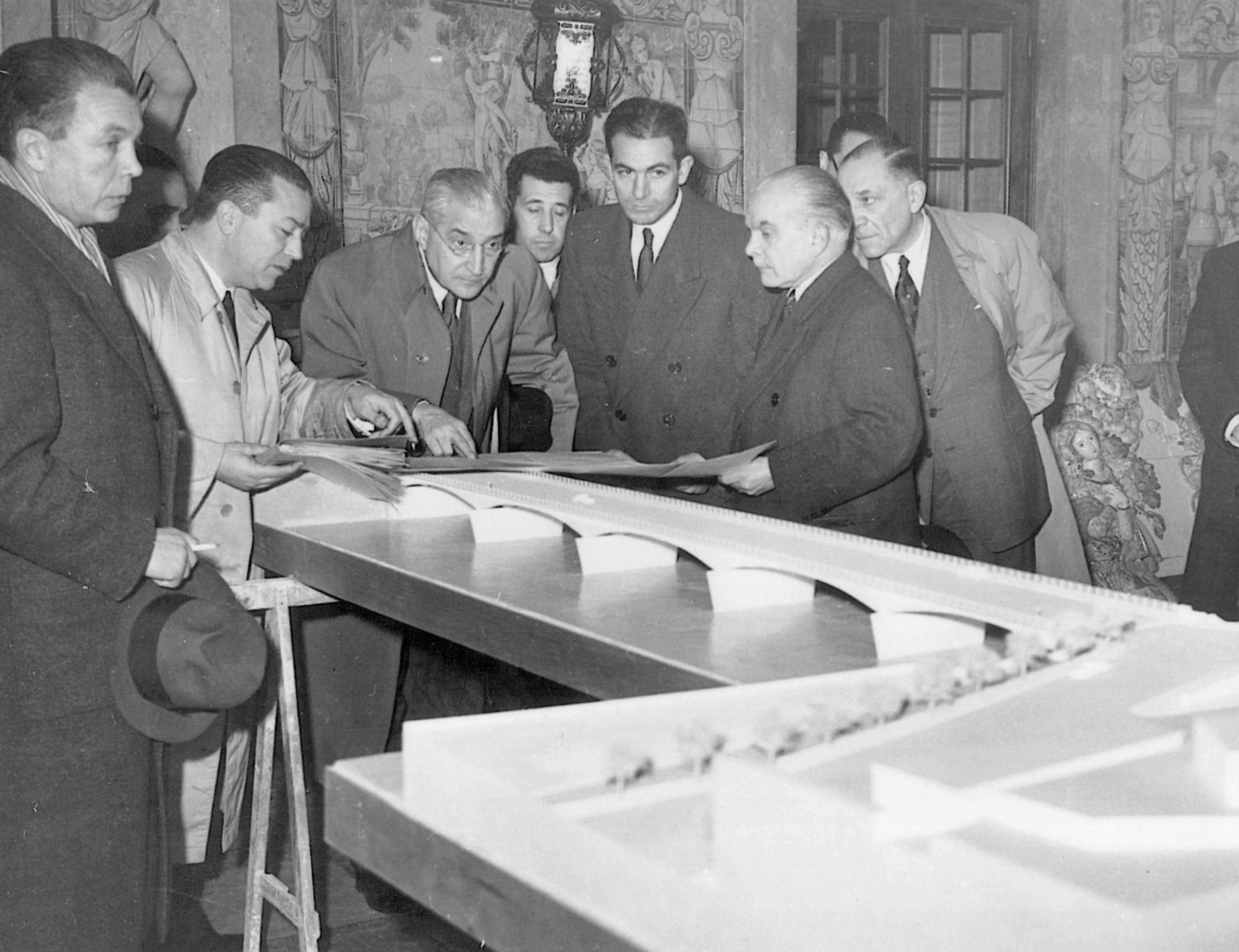
Salazar observing the Santa Clara Bridge maquette in Coimbra

Portugal's overriding problem in 1926 was its enormous public debt. Several times between 1926 and 1928, Salazar turned down appointments to the finance ministry. He pleaded ill-health, devotion to his aged parents and a preference for the academic cloisters. In 1927, under the ministry of Sinel de Cordes, the public deficit kept on growing. The government tried to obtain loans from Baring Brothers under the auspices of the League of Nations, but the conditions were considered unacceptable. With Portugal under the threat of an imminent financial collapse, Salazar finally agreed to become its 81st finance minister on 26 April 1928 after Óscar Carmona was elected president. However, before accepting the position, he personally secured from Carmona a categorical assurance that as finance minister he would have a free hand to veto expenditure in all government departments, not just his own. Salazar was the financial czar virtually from the day he took office.

Within one year, armed with special powers, Salazar balanced the budget and stabilised Portugal's currency. Restoring order to the national accounts, enforcing austerity, and red-penciling waste, Salazar produced the first of many budgetary surpluses, an unparalleled novelty in Portugal.

In July 1940, the American Life magazine featured an article on Portugal, and, referring to its recent chaotic history, asserted that "anyone who saw Portugal 15 years ago might well have said it deserved to die. It was atrociously governed, bankrupt, squalid, ridden with disease and poverty. It was such a mess that the League of Nations coined a word to describe the absolute low in national welfare: 'Portuguese'. Then the Army overthrew the Republic which had brought the country to this sorry pass". Life added that ruling Portugal was difficult and explained how Salazar "found a country in chaos and poverty" and then reformed it".

EFTA member states since 1995 Former member states, now mostly EU member states. Portugal joined the then EEC in 1986 (now the EU), leaving the EFTA where it was a founding member in 1960.

Under Salazar, Estado Novo featured a mixed economy that was neither full liberal capitalism nor communist, and was instead organised along quasi-traditional framework of corporatism. There was extensive state regulation as well as dominance of private ownership of the means of production. Major industrialists of Portugal accepted extensive control in return for a guarantee of minimal public ownership, along with restrictions on economic competition. Salazar's economy organised employers and workers into guilds and syndicates, divided into industries such as transport, commerce and banking; guilds were also organised for farmers and rural workers, fishermen, and skilled professions. Within this framework, the state exercised extensive authority regarding private investment decisions and the level of wages. A relocation or constructions of an industrial plan, as well as investments into machinery or equipment to increase the capacity of already existing enterprises, required government approval. According to Howard J. Wiarda, "in reality both labor and capital and indeed the entire corporate institutional network were subordinate to the central state apparatus". In regards to trade, the Estado Novo was extensively protectionist.

From 1950 until Salazar's death in 1970, Portugal saw its GDP per capita increase at an annual average rate of 5.7 per cent. The rise of new technocrats in the early 1960s with a background in economics and technical-industrial expertise led to a new period of economic fostering, with Portugal as an attractive country for international investment. Industrial development and economic growth continued throughout the 1960s. During Salazar's tenure, Portugal participated in the founding of the European Free Trade Association (EFTA) in 1960 and the Organisation for Economic Co-operation and Development (OECD) in 1961. In the early 1960s, Portugal also added its membership in the General Agreement on Tariffs and Trade (GATT), the International Monetary Fund (IMF), and the World Bank. This marked the initiation of Salazar's more outward-looking economic policy. Portuguese foreign trade increased by 52 per cent in exports and 40 per cent in imports. The economic growth and levels of capital formation from 1960 to 1973 were characterised by unparalleled robust annual growth rates of GDP (6.9 per cent), industrial production (9 per cent), private consumption (6.5 per cent), and gross fixed capital formation (7.8 per cent).

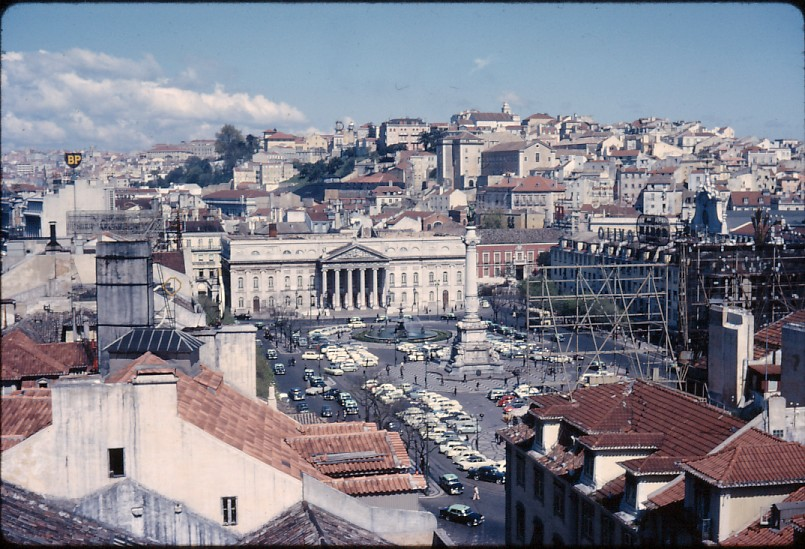
King Pedro IV Square (Rossio), Lisbon, Portugal, April 1964

In 1960, at the initiation of Salazar's more outward-looking economic policy after the beginning of the end of a period of deep economically illiberal corporatism and protectionism, Portugal's per capita GDP was only 38 per cent of the European Community (EC-12) average; by the end of the Salazar period, in 1968, it had risen to 48 per cent; and in 1973, under the leadership of Marcelo Caetano, Portugal's per capita GDP had reached 56.4 per cent of the EC-12 average. On a long term analysis, after a long period of economic divergence before 1914, and a period of chaos during the First Republic, the Portuguese economy recovered slightly until 1950, entering thereafter on a path of strong economic convergence with the wealthiest economies of Western Europe, until the Carnation Revolution in April 1974. Portuguese economic growth in the period 1960 to 1973 under the Estado Novo regime (and even with the effects of an expensive war effort in African territories against independentist guerrilla groups supported by the Communist Bloc and others), created an opportunity for real integration with the developed economies of Western Europe. Through emigration, trade, tourism and foreign investment, individuals and firms changed their patterns of production and consumption, bringing about a structural transformation. Simultaneously, the increasing complexity of a growing economy raised new technical and organizational challenges, stimulating the formation of modern professional and management teams.

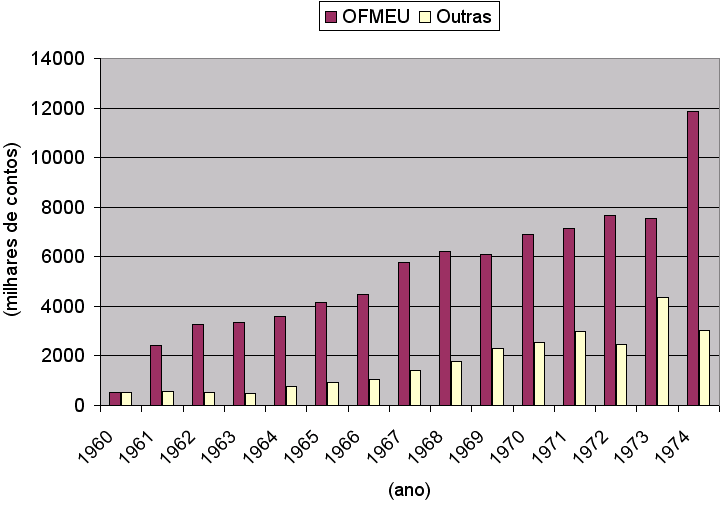
Portuguese military expenses during the Colonial War: OFMEU – National Budget for Overseas Military Expenses; *conto – popular expression for "$1000 (PTE)"

Regarding the overseas territories, beyond military measures, the official Portuguese response to the "winds of change" in the African colonies was to integrate them administratively and economically more closely with the mainland. This was accomplished through the population and capital transfers, trade liberalisation, and the creation of a common currency, the so-called "Escudo Area". The integration program established in 1961 provided for the removal of Portugal's duties on imports from its overseas territories by January 1964. The latter, on the other hand, were permitted to continue to levy duties on goods imported from Portugal but at a preferential rate, in most cases, 50 per cent of the normal duties levied by the territories on goods originating outside the Escudo Area. The effect of this two-tier tariff system was to give Portugal's exports preferential access to its colonial markets.

Portuguese overseas territories in Africa during the Estado Novo regime: Angola and Mozambique were by far the two largest of those territories.

The very late and excruciatingly slow liberalisation of the Portuguese economy gained a new impetus under Salazar's successor, Prime Minister Marcello José das Neves Caetano (1968–1974), whose administration abolished industrial licensing requirements for firms in most sectors and in 1972 signed a free trade agreement with the newly enlarged European Community. Under the agreement, which took effect at the beginning of 1973, Portugal was given until 1980 to abolish its restrictions on most community goods and until 1985 on certain sensitive products amounting to some 10 per cent of the EC's total exports to Portugal. Starting in 1960, EFTA membership and a growing foreign investor presence contributed to Portugal's industrial modernisation and export diversification between 1960 and 1973. Caetano moved on to foster economic growth and some social improvements, such as the awarding of a monthly pension to rural workers who had never had the chance to pay social security. Some large-scale investments were made at the national level, such as the building of a major oil processing center in Sines.

Notwithstanding the concentration of the means of production in the hands of a small number of family-based financial-industrial groups, Portuguese business culture permitted a surprising upward mobility of university-educated individuals with middle-class backgrounds into professional management careers.

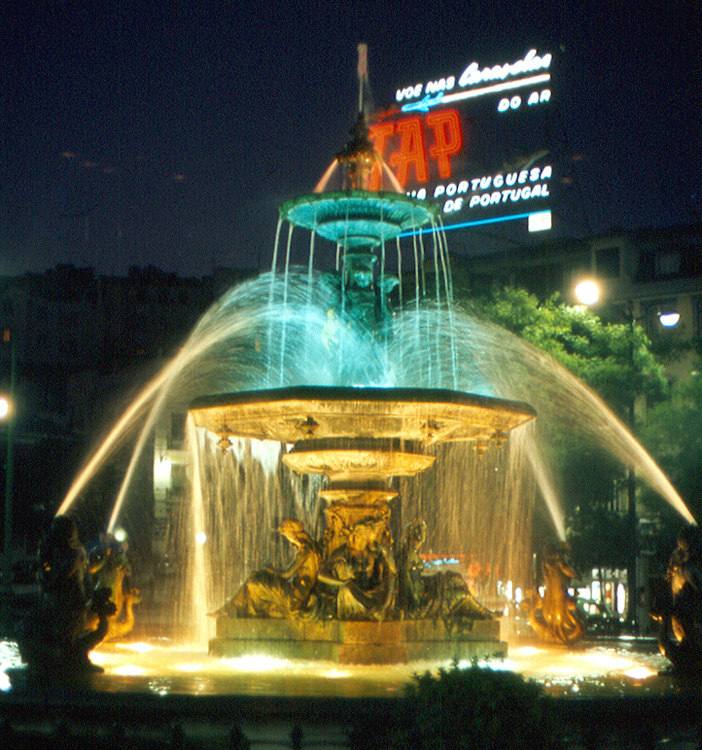
Rossio Square, Lisbon, in June 1968, showing a TAP airline commercial in the background at night

By the early 1970s Portugal's fast economic growth with increasing consumption and purchase of new automobiles set the priority for improvements in transportation. Brisa – Autoestradas de Portugal was founded in 1972 and the state granted the company a 30-year concession to design, build, manage, and maintain a modern network of express motorways.

The economy of Portugal and its overseas territories on the eve of the Carnation Revolution (a military coup on 25 April 1974) was growing. Average family purchasing power was rising together with new consumption patterns and trends and this was promoting both investments in new capital equipment and consumption expenditure for durable and nondurable consumer goods.

The Estado Novo regime's economic policy encouraged and created conditions for the formation of large business conglomerates. Economically, the Estado Novo regime maintained a policy of corporatism that resulted in the placement of a big part of the Portuguese economy in the hands of a number of strong conglomerates, including those founded by the families of António Champalimaud (Banco Pinto & Sotto Mayor, Cimpor), José Manuel de Mello (CUF – Companhia União Fabril, Banco Totta & Açores), Américo Amorim (Corticeira Amorim) and the dos Santos family (Jerónimo Martins). Those Portuguese conglomerates had business models with similarities to Japanese keiretsus and zaibatsus or the South Korean chaebols in terms of vision, mission and purpose. The Companhia União Fabril (CUF) was one of the largest and most diversified Portuguese conglomerates with its core businesses (cement, chemicals, petrochemicals, agrochemicals, textiles, beer, beverages, metallurgy, naval engineering, electrical engineering, insurance, banking, paper, tourism, mining, etc.) and corporate headquarters located in mainland Portugal, but also with branches, plants and several developing business projects all around the Portuguese Empire, especially in the Portuguese territories of Angola and Mozambique. Other medium-sized family companies specialised in textiles (for instance those located in the city of Covilhã and the northwest), ceramics, porcelain, glass and crystal (like those of Alcobaça, Caldas da Rainha and Marinha Grande), engineered wood (like SONAE near Porto), motorcycle manufacturing (like Casal and FAMEL in the District of Aveiro), canned fish (like those of Algarve and the northwest which included one of the oldest canned fish companies in continuous operation in the world), fishing, food and beverages (alcoholic beverages, from liqueurs like Licor Beirão and Ginjinha, to beer like Sagres, were produced across the entire country, but port wine was one of its most reputed and exported alcoholic beverages), tourism (well established in Estoril, Cascais and Sintra (the Portuguese Riviera) and growing as an international attraction in the Algarve since the 1960s) and in agriculture and agribusiness (like the ones scattered around Ribatejo and Alentejo – known as the "breadbasket of Portugal", as well as the notorious Cachão Agroindustrial Complex established in Mirandela, Northern Portugal, in 1963) completed the panorama of the national economy by the early 1970s and included export-oriented foreign direct investment-funded businesses such as an automotive assembly plant founded in 1962 by Citroën which began operations in 1964 in Mangualde and a Leica factory established in 1973 in Vila Nova de Famalicão. In addition, the rural population was committed to agrarianism—greatly important for a majority of the total population, with many families living exclusively from agriculture or complementing their salaries with farming, husbandry and forestry yields.

Angola and Mozambique were internationally notable centres of production of oil, coffee, cotton, cashew, coconut, timber, minerals (like diamonds), metals (like iron and aluminium), banana, citrus, tea, sisal, beer (Cuca (Angola) and Laurentina (Mozambique) were successful beer brands produced locally), cement, fish and other sea products, beef and textiles. Tourism was also a fast developing activity in Portuguese Africa both by the growing development of and demand for beach resorts and wildlife reserves. While the counterinsurgency war encountered several successes in Angola, it was less than satisfactorily contained in Mozambique and dangerously stalemated in Portuguese Guinea from the Portuguese point of view, so the Portuguese government decided to create sustainability policies in order to allow continuous sources of financing for the war effort in the long run.

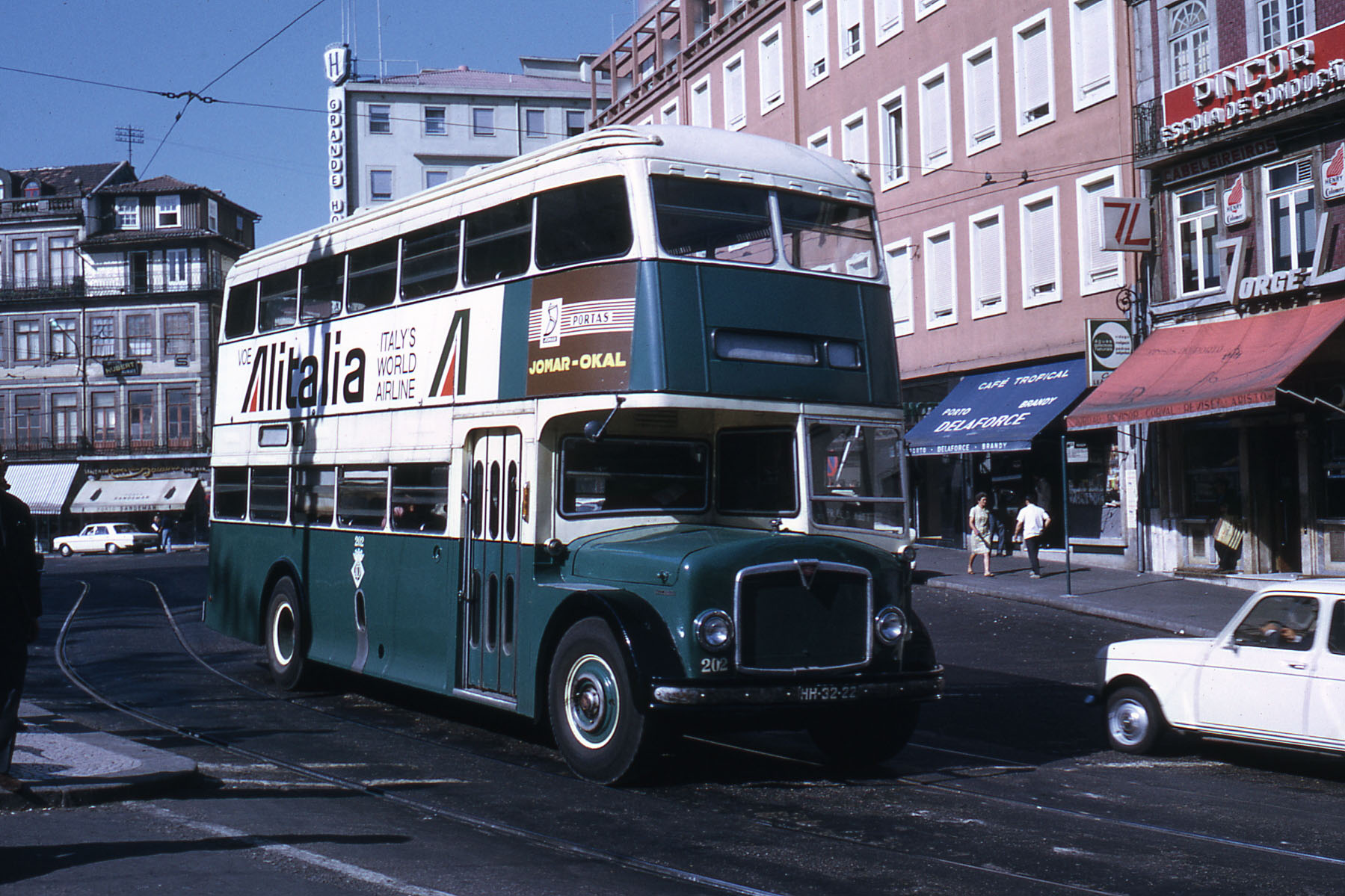
Bus in the city of Porto, 1972

On 13 November 1972, a sovereign wealth fund (Fundo do Ultramar – the Overseas Fund) was enacted through the Decree Law Decreto-Lei No. 448/ /72 and the Ministry of Defense ordinance Portaria 696/72, in order to finance the counterinsurgency effort in the Portuguese overseas territories. In addition, new decree laws (Decree Law: Decretos-Leis Nos. 353, de 13 de Julho de 1973, e 409, de 20 de Agosto) were enforced in order to cut down military expenses and increase the number of officers by incorporating irregular militia as if they were regular military academy officers.

Labour unions were not allowed and a minimum wage policy was not enforced. However, in a context of an expanding economy, bringing better living conditions for the Portuguese population in the 1960s, the outbreak of the colonial wars in Africa set off significant social changes, among them the rapid incorporation of more and more women into the labour market. Marcelo Caetano moved on to foster economic growth and some social improvements, such as the awarding of a monthly pension to rural workers who had never had the chance to pay social security. The objectives of Caetano's pension reform were threefold: enhancing equity, reducing fiscal and actuarial imbalance, and achieving more efficiency for the economy as a whole, for example, by establishing contributions less distortive to labour markets or by allowing the savings generated by pension funds to increase the investments in the economy. In 1969, with the replacement of Salazar by Marcelo Caetano, the Estado Novo-controlled nation got indeed a very slight taste of democracy and Caetano allowed the formation of the first democratic labour union movement since the 1920s.

== Education ==
=== First years (1933–1936) ===
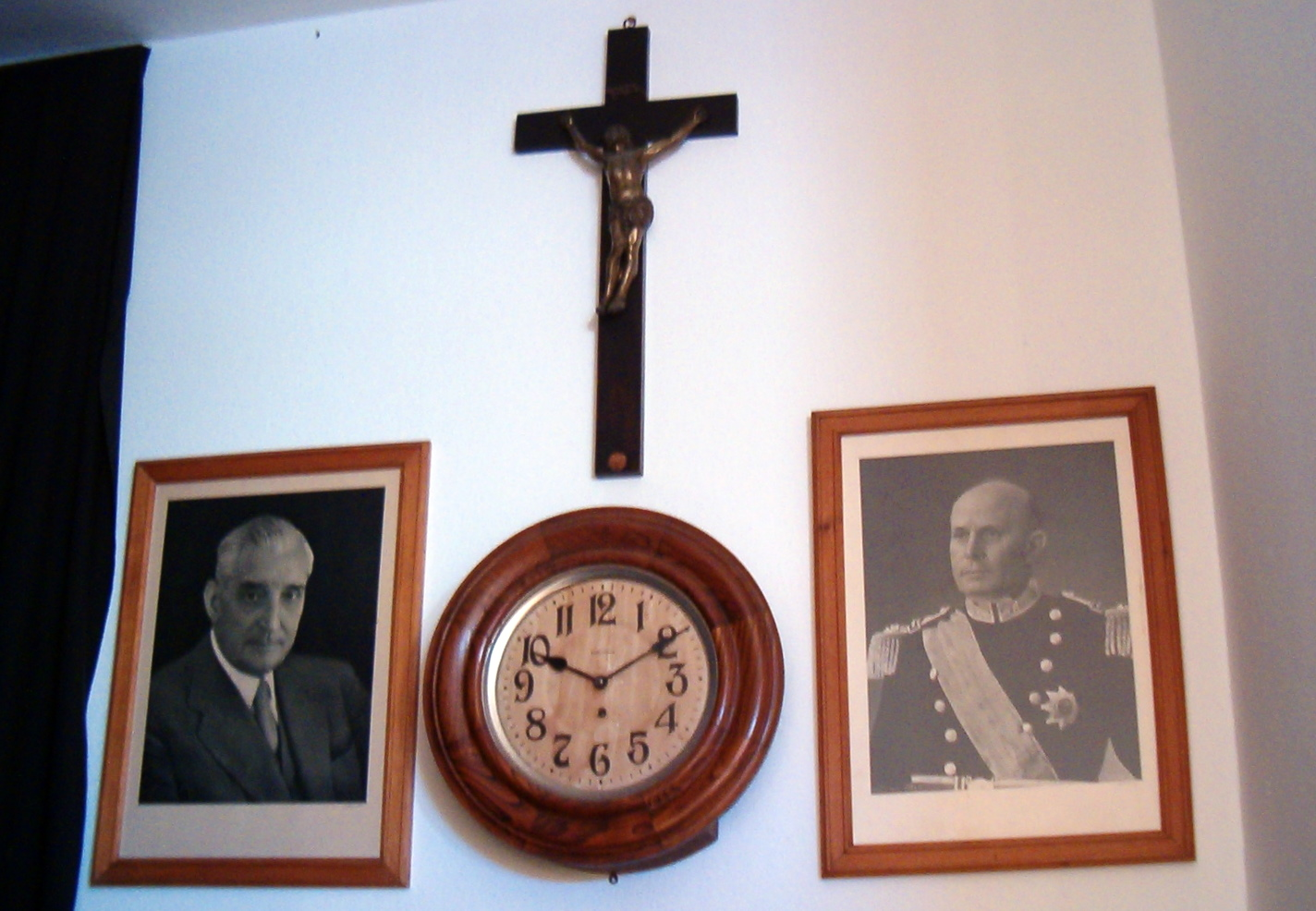
Required elements of primary schools during the Estado Novo: a crucifix and portraits of Salazar and Américo Tomás

With its founding 1933 political constitution, the Estado Novo established compulsory education at three years. Compulsory education was first introduced in Portugal during the monarchy (in 1844) with the duration of three years, then increased to five years during the First Republic, but it was never really enforced. The political constitution defines public education as aiming for: "in addition to the physical reinvigoration and the improvement of intellectual faculties, the formation of character, professional value and all civic and moral virtues" (Constituição de 1933, Artigo 43).

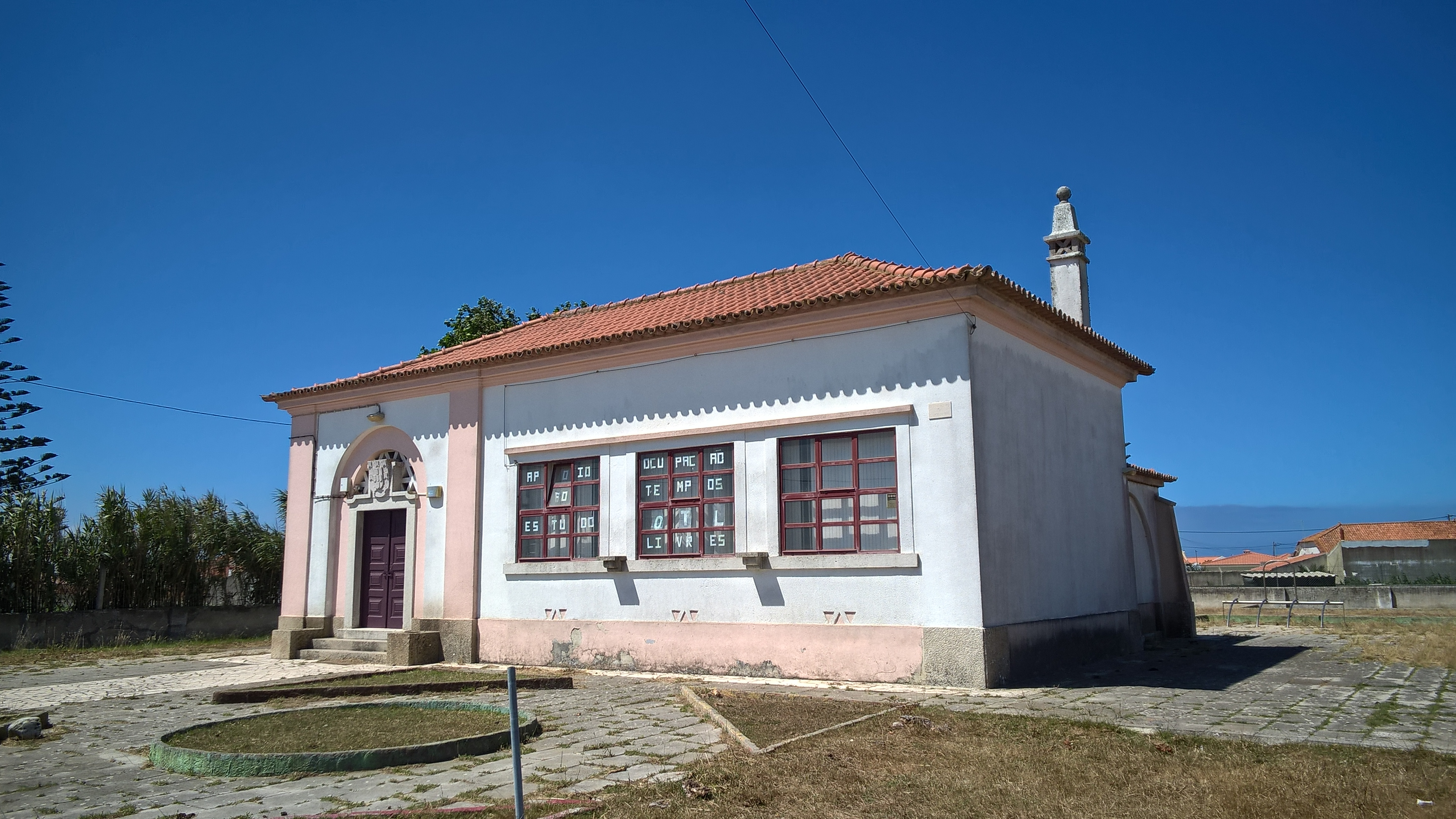
Example of a primary school built during the Estado Novo's Plano dos Centenários, with its distinctive Portuguese shield over the entrance

During the first three years of the Estado Novo, the then Ministry of Public Instruction, had a total of four different ministers.

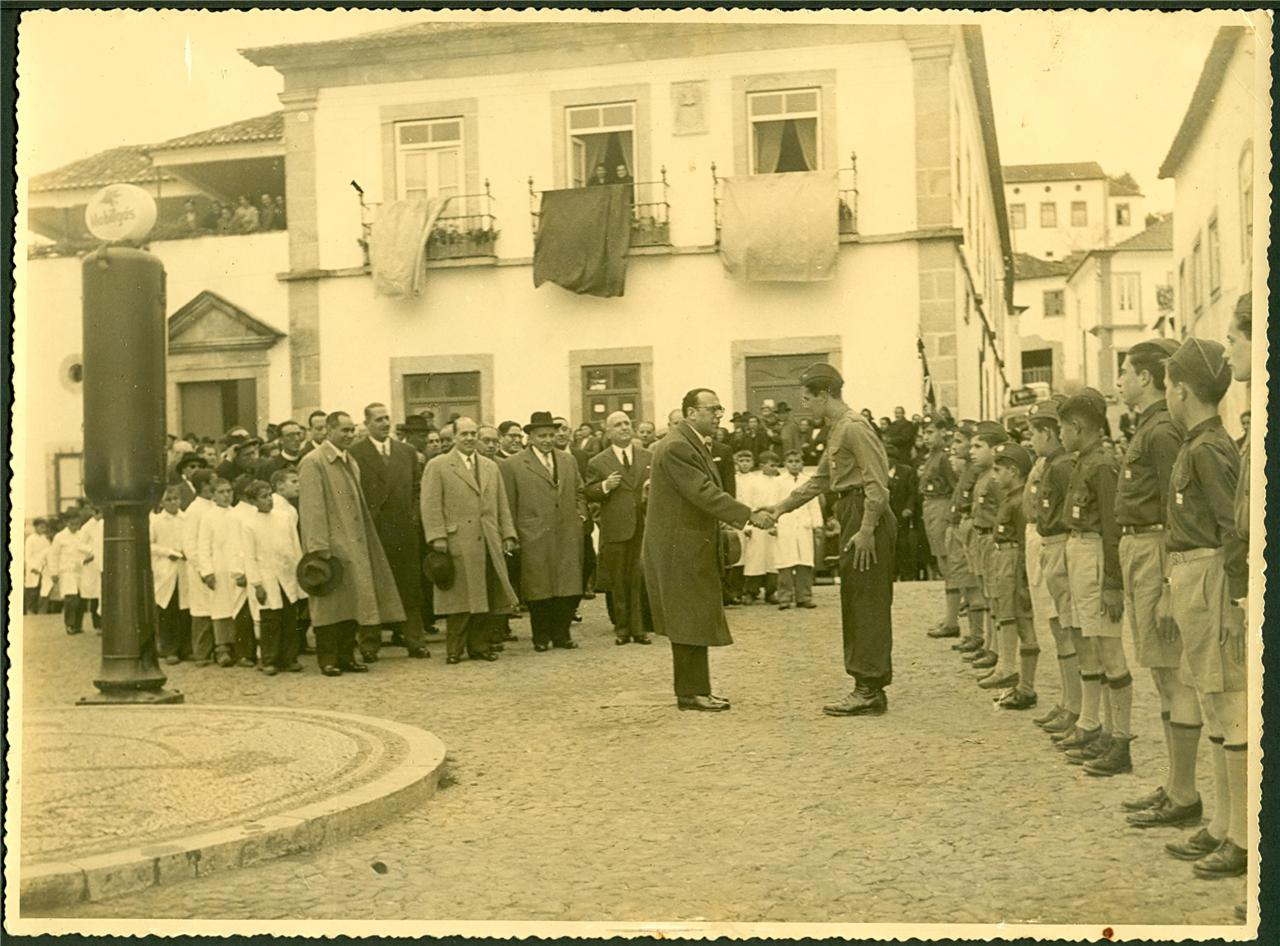
Children in Mocidade Portuguesa's uniform on the right, 1956

=== Ministry of Carneiro Pacheco (1936–1940) ===
In 1936, António Carneiro Pacheco (then rector of the University of Lisbon) was nominated as the minister of the public instruction. In the same year, his ministry issued a law that altered the ministry's name to Ministry of National Education, and included a National Board of Education (Junta Nacional da Educação). This National Board of Education aimed to study and inform the minister in all matters of both education and culture. Parents and educators were to be represented in all sections of this board, except for the cultural relations and scientific research section. This board replaced the Superior Council for Public Instruction, which had existed since 1835, along with other consulting boards, such as the National Board of Excavations and Antiques.

Further events of note during Pacheco's mandate were the creation of the Mocidade Portuguesa, the Plan of the Centennials (Plano dos Centenários), and the adoption of a single, national textbook for each grade.

The Mocidade Portuguesa was established in 1936, defined as a "national and pre-military organization that is able to stimulate the integral development of [the youth's] physical capacities, the formation of [their] character and devotion to the Fatherland and put [them] in conditions to be able to compete effectively for its defense" (Law 1941, Base XI).

The Plan of the Centennials aimed to build a network of schools, uniformed by region, that would obey the pedagogical and hygienic criteria of the time. The buildings would be adapted to reflect the differences in climate, material resources, and processes of construction of each region. The plan was officially approved in 1939, but due to World War II, only started its first phase in 1944. It extended well beyond Pacheco's mandate, with its VI phase in 1959. It was replaced in 1961 by the "New Plan of Constructions". Between 1930 and 1940, the number of primary schools grew from 27,000 to 40,000.

=== Between Carneiro Pacheco and Veiga Simão (1940–1970) ===
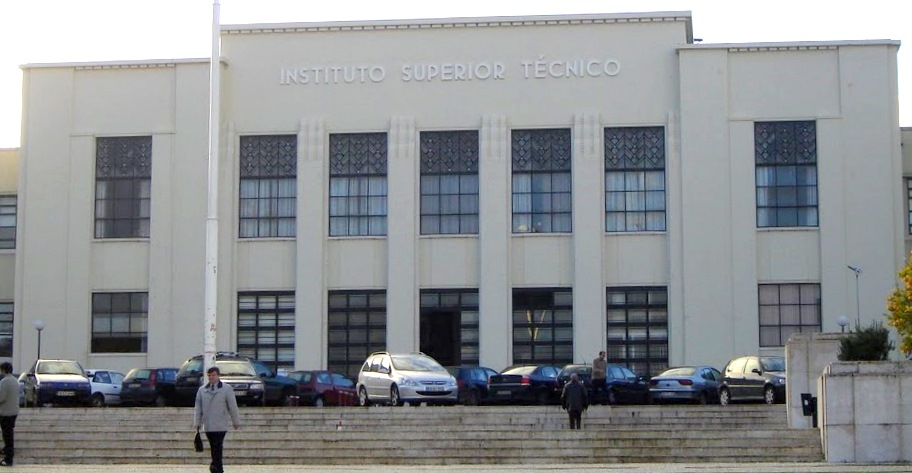
Instituto Superior Técnico, the largest and most prestigious school of engineering in Portugal, built in 1937

In 1952, while 81.4% of the children aged 10 to 11 were literate, only 6.3% of them had finished the three years of compulsory education. In this same year, a vast multi-pronged Plan for Popular Education was launched with the intent of reducing adolescent and adult illiteracy and put into school every child of school age. This plan included fines for parents who did not comply, and these were strictly enforced.

In 1956, compulsory education for boys (and girls in 1960) was raised from three to four years.

By the late 1950s, Portugal had succeeded in pulling itself out of the educational abyss in which it had long found itself: illiteracy among children of school age virtually disappeared.

The University of Coimbra General Library main building – Edifício Novo (New Building, 1962) in the Alta Universitária, Coimbra

In 1959, the education minister, Leite Pinto, promoted the first conversations between Portugal and OECD, that led to Portugal being included in an OECD project (DEEB, Development and Economy in Educational Building) to help mediterranean countries in 1963.

In 1962, the Overseas Ministry, then headed by Adriano Moreira, founded universities in the overseas provinces of Angola (University of Luanda) and Mozambique (University of Lourenço Marques). In addition, the long established Lisbon and Coimbra universities had been highly expanded and modernised by this decade. New buildings and campuses were constructed. Great works of expansion and modernisation of the University of Lisbon in the 1950s and 1960s and of the University of Coimbra from 1943 onwards, developed entire new areas in those two cities known as Cidade Universitária (Lisbon) and Alta Universitária (Coimbra).

In 1964, compulsory education was raised from four to six years.

In 1965, an instructional television program was created (Telescola), filmed in Rádio e Televisão de Portugal's studios in Porto to support isolated rural areas and overcrowded suburban schools.

=== Veiga Simão Reforms (1970–1974) ===
In 1970, during the Marcelist Spring, José Veiga Simão (1929–2014) (then rector of Universidade de Lourenço Marques) became the last minister of education of the Estado Novo. In 1971, Veiga Simão went on TV to present two projects, one aimed at reforming the school system, the other aimed at reforming higher education. In that same year, his ministry would recognise the Portuguese Catholic University. In July 1973, after ample social discussion of his projects, Veiga Simão launched a "Basic Law of Education", which aimed to democratise education in Portugal and, in August of that year, also launched a decree that would create the Nova de Lisboa, Aveiro and Minho universities, the Instituto Universitário de Évora, several politechnical schools (e.g., Covilhã, Faro, Leiria, Setúbal, Tomar, Vila Real) and superior schools (e.g., Beja, Bragança, Castelo Branco, Funchal, Ponta Delgada). Less than a year later, the Carnation Revolution took place, ending the Estado Novo.

== End of the regime ==
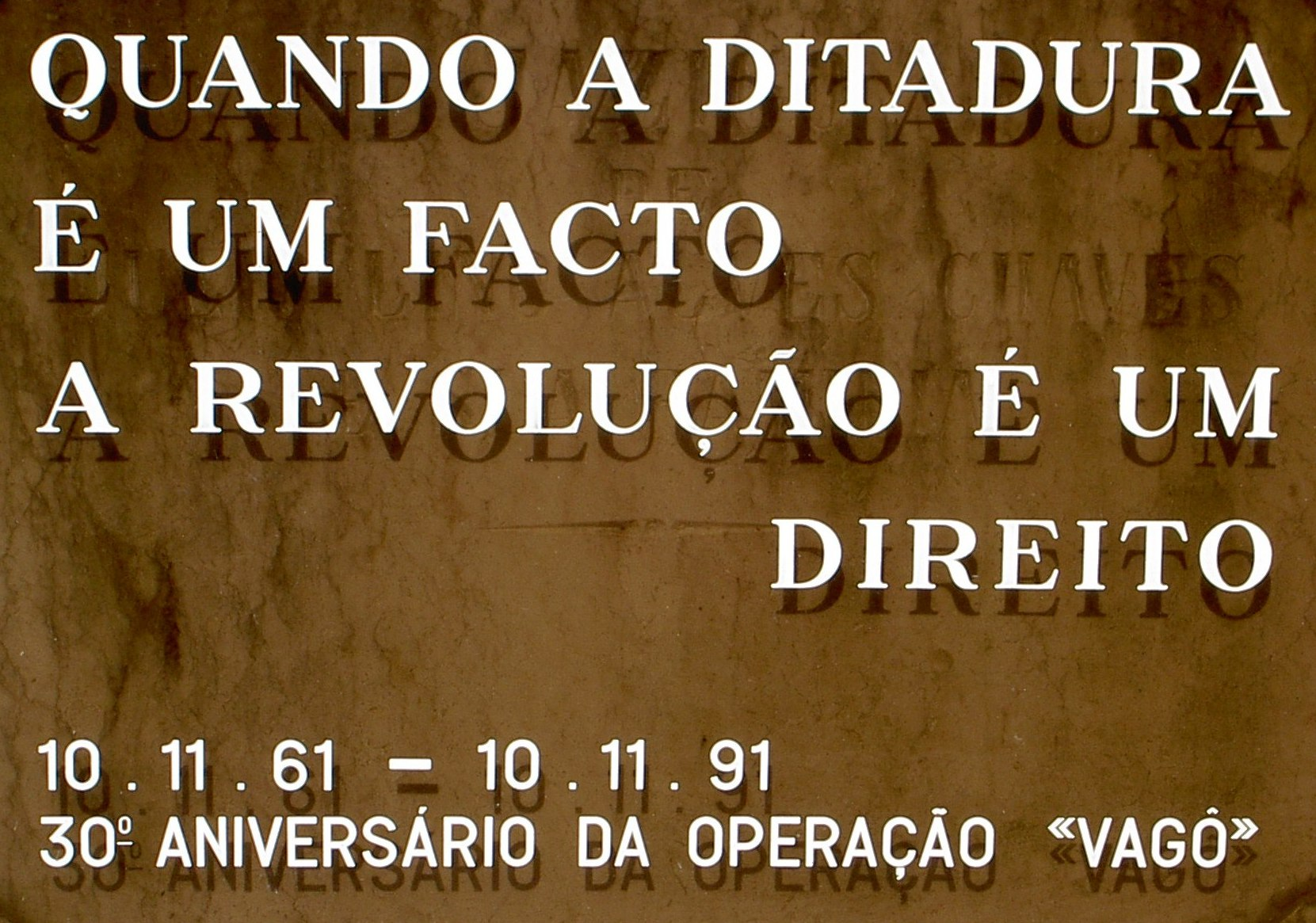
Memorial at the churchyard Cemitério dos Prazeres in Lisbon for one of the many actions against the regime of Salazar; Operation Vagô where leaflets were spread over several Portuguese cities from a TAP plane in 1961. The text says: "When the dictatorship is a reality, the revolution is a right."

Coat of arms of Portuguese India

Coat of arms of the Portuguese Overseas Province of Angola

Coat of arms of the Portuguese Overseas Province of Guinea

Coat of arms of the Portuguese Overseas Province of Mozambique

Coat of arms of Portuguese Timor

After India achieved independence in 1947 under the Attlee government, pro-Indian residents of the Portuguese overseas territory of Dadra and Nagar Haveli, with the support of the Indian government and the help of pro-independence organisations, liberated Dadra and Nagar Haveli from Portuguese rule in 1954. In 1961, the Fort of São João Baptista de Ajudá's annexation by the Republic of Dahomey was the start of a process that led to the final dissolution of the centuries-old Portuguese Empire. According to the census of 1921 São João Baptista de Ajudá had 5 inhabitants and, at the moment of the ultimatum by the Dahomey Government, it had only 2 inhabitants representing Portuguese sovereignty. Another forcible retreat from overseas territories occurred in December 1961 when Portugal refused to relinquish the territories of Goa and Daman and Diu. As a result, the Portuguese army and navy were involved in armed conflict in its colony of Portuguese India against the Indian Armed Forces. The operations resulted in the defeat of the limited Portuguese defensive garrison, which was forced to surrender to a much larger military force. The outcome was the loss of the remaining Portuguese territories in the Indian subcontinent. The Portuguese regime refused to recognise Indian sovereignty over the annexed territories, which continued to be represented in Portugal's National Assembly. The so-called "Winds of Change" concerning historical colonisation in Europe-ruled overseas territories, started to have influence over the centuries-old empire. The end of the Estado Novo effectively began with the uprisings in the overseas territories in Africa during the 1960s. The independence movements active in Portuguese Angola, Portuguese Mozambique and Portuguese Guinea were supported by both the United States and the Soviet Union, which both wanted to end all colonial empires and expand their own spheres of influence.

For the Portuguese ruling regime, the centuries-old overseas empire was a matter of national interest. The criticism against some kinds of racial discrimination in the Portuguese African territories were refuted on the grounds that all Portuguese Africans would be Westernized and assimilated in due time, through a process called the civilising mission. The wars had the same effects in Portugal as the Vietnam War in the United States, or the Afghanistan War in the Soviet Union; they were unpopular and expensive lengthy wars which were isolating Portugal diplomatically, leading many to question the continuation of the war and, by extension, the government. Although Portugal was able to maintain some superiority in the colonies by its use of elite paratroopers and special operations troops, the foreign support to the guerrillas, including arms embargoes and other sanctions against the Portuguese, made them more manoeuvrable, allowing them to inflict losses on the Portuguese army. The international community isolated Portugal due to the long-lasting Colonial War. The situation was aggravated by the illness of Salazar, the strong man of the regime, in 1968. His replacement was one of his closest advisors, Marcelo Caetano, who tried to slowly democratise the country, but could not hide the obvious dictatorship that oppressed Portugal. Salazar died in 1970.

After spending the early years of his priesthood in Africa, the British priest Adrian Hastings created a storm in 1973 with an article in The Times about the "Wiriyamu Massacre" in Mozambique, revealing that the Portuguese Army had massacred some 400 villagers at the village of Wiriyamu, near Tete, in December 1972. His report was printed a week before the Portuguese prime minister, Marcelo Caetano, was due to visit Britain to celebrate the 600th anniversary of the Anglo-Portuguese Alliance. Portugal's growing isolation following Hastings's claims has often been cited as a factor that helped to bring about the "carnation revolution" coup which deposed the Caetano regime in 1974.

The various conflicts forced the Salazar and subsequent Caetano governments to spend more of the country's budget on colonial administration and military expenditures, and Portugal soon found itself increasingly isolated from the rest of the world. After Caetano succeeded to the prime ministership, the colonial war became a major cause of dissent and a focus for anti-government forces in Portuguese society. Many young dissidents, such as left-wing students and anti-war activists, were forced to leave the country so they could escape imprisonment or conscription. However, between 1945 and 1974, there were also three generations of militants of the radical right at the Portuguese universities and schools, guided by a revolutionary nationalism partly influenced by the political sub-culture of European neofascism. The core of the struggle of these radical students lay in an uncompromising defence of the Portuguese Empire in the days of the authoritarian regime.

By the early 1970s, the Portuguese Colonial War continued to rage on, requiring a steadily increasing budget. The Portuguese military was overstretched and there was no political solution or end in sight. While the human losses were relatively small, the war as a whole had already entered its second decade. The Portuguese ruling regime of Estado Novo faced criticism from the international community and was becoming increasingly isolated. It had a profound impact on Portugal – thousands of young men avoided conscription by emigrating illegally, mainly to France and the US.

The war in the colonies was increasingly unpopular in Portugal itself as the people became weary of war and balked at its ever-rising cost. Many ethnic Portuguese in the African overseas territories were also increasingly willing to accept independence if their economic status could be preserved. However, despite the guerrillas' unpredictable and sporadic attacks against targets all over the countryside of the Portuguese African territories, the economies of both Portuguese Angola and Mozambique were booming, cities and towns were expanding and prospering steadily over time, new transportation networks were being opened to link the well-developed and highly urbanised coastal strip with the more remote inland regions. The number of ethnic European Portuguese migrants from mainland Portugal (the metrópole) increased rapidly since the 1950s (although always as a small minority of each territory's total population).

Suddenly, after some failed attempts of military rebellion, in April 1974 the Carnation Revolution in Lisbon, organised by left-wing Portuguese military officers – the Armed Forces Movement (MFA), overthrew the Estado Novo regime. The military-led coup ended the unpopular Colonial War where thousands of Portuguese soldiers had been commissioned, and replaced the authoritarian Estado Novo (New State) regime and its secret police which restricted civil liberties and political freedoms. However, the military coup's organisation started as a professional class protest of Portuguese Armed Forces captains against a law: the Dec. Lei nº 353/73 of 1973. Younger military academy graduates resented a program introduced by Marcello Caetano whereby militia officers who completed a brief training program and had served in the overseas territories' defensive campaigns, could be commissioned at the same rank as military academy graduates. Caetano's Portuguese Government had begun the program (which included several other reforms) in order to increase the number of officers employed against the African insurgencies, and at the same time cut down military costs to alleviate an already overburdened government budget. After the coup, the MFA-led National Salvation Junta, a military junta, took power. Caetano resigned, and was flown under custody to the Madeira islands where he stayed for a few days. He then flew to exile in Brazil. By 1975 the Portuguese Empire had all but collapsed.

== Aftermath ==
Writing in 1986, historian Kenneth Maxwell considered that, for many reasons, Portugal, in its transition from authoritarian rule to a more democratic government, resembled Nicaragua more than any other among the South American nations. During the final months of the Francoist State, which had survived to this point, Spain considered invading Portugal to check the perceived threat of communism caused by the Carnation Revolution.

After a period of social unrest, factionalism, and uncertainty in Portuguese politics, between 1974 and 1976, neither far left nor far right radicalism prevailed. However, pro-communist and socialist elements retained control of the country for several months before elections. Álvaro Cunhal's Portuguese Communist Party (PCP) remained Stalinist in outlook and unsympathetic to the sort of reforms that were emerging as "Euro-Communism" in other countries in Western Europe.

The retreat from the colonies and the acceptance of its independence terms which would create newly independent communist states in 1975 (most notably the People's Republic of Angola and the People's Republic of Mozambique) prompted a mass exodus of Portuguese citizens from Portugal's African territories (mostly from Portuguese Angola and Mozambique), creating over a million destitute Portuguese refugees — the retornados. By 1975, all the Portuguese African territories were independent and Portugal held its first democratic elections in 50 years. However, the country continued to be governed by a military-civilian provisional administration until the Portuguese legislative election of 1976.

For the Portuguese and their former colonies, this was a difficult period, but many felt that the short-term effects of the Carnation Revolution were well worth the trouble when civil rights and political freedoms were achieved. The Portuguese celebrate Freedom Day on 25 April every year, and the day is a national holiday in Portugal. By refusing to grant independence to its overseas territories in Africa, the Portuguese ruling regime of Estado Novo was criticised by most of the international community, and its leaders Salazar and Caetano were accused of being blind to the "Winds of Change". After the Carnation Revolution in 1974 and the fall of the incumbent Portuguese authoritarian regime, almost all the Portugal-ruled territories outside Europe became independent. In the following decades, Portugal remained a net beneficiary of European Union Structural and Cohesion Funds and didn't avoid three IMF-led bailouts between the late 1970s and the early 2010s. In 2011, during the Portuguese financial crisis when the country had to request international financial assistance, Otelo Saraiva de Carvalho, the Portuguese military officer who was the chief strategist of the 1974 Carnation Revolution in Lisbon, stated that he wouldn't have started the revolution if he had known what the country would become after it. He also stated that the country would need a man as honest as Salazar to deal with the crisis, but from a non-fascist perspective.

The 2020s Chega party's slogan, "God, country, family and work" is an appropriation and elaboration of the slogan "God, country, family" used by the Portuguese dictator, António de Oliveira Salazar.

Since the fall of the Estado Novo regime, Portugal experienced sustained economic growth and became a developed and high-income country with a GDP per capita of 82% of the EU27 average in 2024, and a HDI of 0.874 (the 42nd highest in the world) in 2022.

== See also ==
- Francoist Spain
- Jacques Ploncard, a French Petainist, counsellor of Salazar
- Portuguese Legion (Estado Novo)
- Yves Guérin-Sérac

== Sources ==
- de Carvalho, Rita Almeida (17 October 2018). "Ideology and Architecture in the Portuguese 'Estado Novo': Cultural Innovation within a Para-Fascist State (1932–1945)". Fascism. 7 (2): 141–174. doi:10.1163/22116257-00702002. hdl:10451/35277. ISSN 2211-6257.
- Derrick, Michael; Stove, R.J. (1938). The Portugal of Salazar. New York: Campion Books, Ltd.
- Gallagher, Tom (1983). Portugal: A Twentieth-century Interpretation. Manchester University Press. pp. 60, 99. ISBN 978-0719008764.
- Gallagher, Tom (1990). "Chapter 9: Conservatism, dictatorship and fascism in Portugal, 1914–45". In Blinkhorn, Martin (ed.). Fascists and conservatives: the radical right and the establishment in twentieth-century Europe. London: Unwin Hyman. pp. 157–173. ISBN 978-0-04-940086-3.
- Kay, Hugh (1970). Salazar and modern Portugal. New York: Hawthorne Books. ISBN 978-0-413-26700-9.
- Leite, Joaquim da Costa (1998). "Neutrality by Agreement: Portugal and the British Alliance in World War II". American University International Law Review. 14 (1): 185–199.
- Meneses, Filipe (2009). Salazar: A Political Biography. Enigma Books. p. 544. ISBN 978-1929631902.
- Paxton, Robert O. (2004). The Anatomy of Fascism. Alfred A. Knopf.
- Palma, Nuno; Reis, Jaime (2018). "A tale of two regimes: Educational Achievement and Institutions in Portugal, 1910–1950". CEPR Centre for Economic Policy Research. p. 4. S2CID 131028377.
- Wheeler, Douglas L. (1983). "In the Service of Order: The Portuguese Political Police and the British, German and Spanish Intelligence, 1932–1945". Journal of Contemporary History. 18 (1): 1–25. doi:10.1177/002200948301800101. ISSN 0022-0094. JSTOR 260478. S2CID 153719176.
- Wiarda, Howard J. (1977). Corporatism and Development: The Portuguese Experience. Univ of Massachusetts Press. ISBN 978-0870232213.
