= FAMEL =

Moped manufacturer

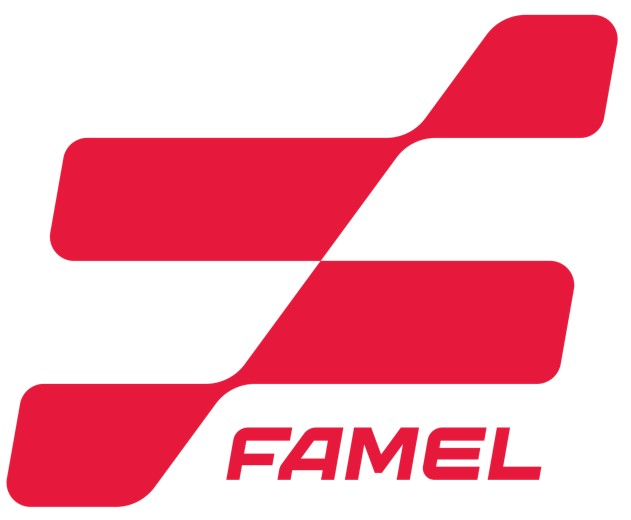
- Industry: Motorcycle
- Founded: 1949; 77 years ago, refounded in 2021
- Headquarters: Avepark, Guimarães, Portugal
- Key people: Joel Sousa (CEO)
- Products: Motorcycle
- Website: https://famel.pt/?lang=en

FAMEL - Fabrica de Produtos Metalicos Lda, was one of the largest Portuguese moped manufacturers between 1960s and 1980s.

== History ==
Based in Águeda, the company was set up in the second half of the 1940s by three partners with the aim of producing moped and bicycle rims. In 1952, it decided to diversify its activities into the manufacture of mopeds. Until its closure, in 1994, it manufactured over 30 models using engines from various third parties, including Pachancho, Alpino, Rex, Veloce, Mota, Jlo, Dkw and, mostly, Zündapp. Its first model, the Utilitária, with a 2 speed Pachancho engine, dates from 1952 whereas the last one, the Famel Electric (an electrical scooter) dates from 1994. Its first big market success was the Foguete, a tubular cradle moped with a Jlo 3 speed engine launched in 1957 which was quite good looking at the time and which came out when Famel's main competitor, Cruzador, was stuck with quite old and dated models. When two years later, in 1959, Cruzador launched a totally new model, the Andorinha Asa d'Ouro, with a Sachs 3 speed engine, the Foguete lost a lot of its shine and its production was discontinued shortly after. Famel's most popular model was the XF-17, launched in 1975. and sold until the company went bankrupt in 1994.

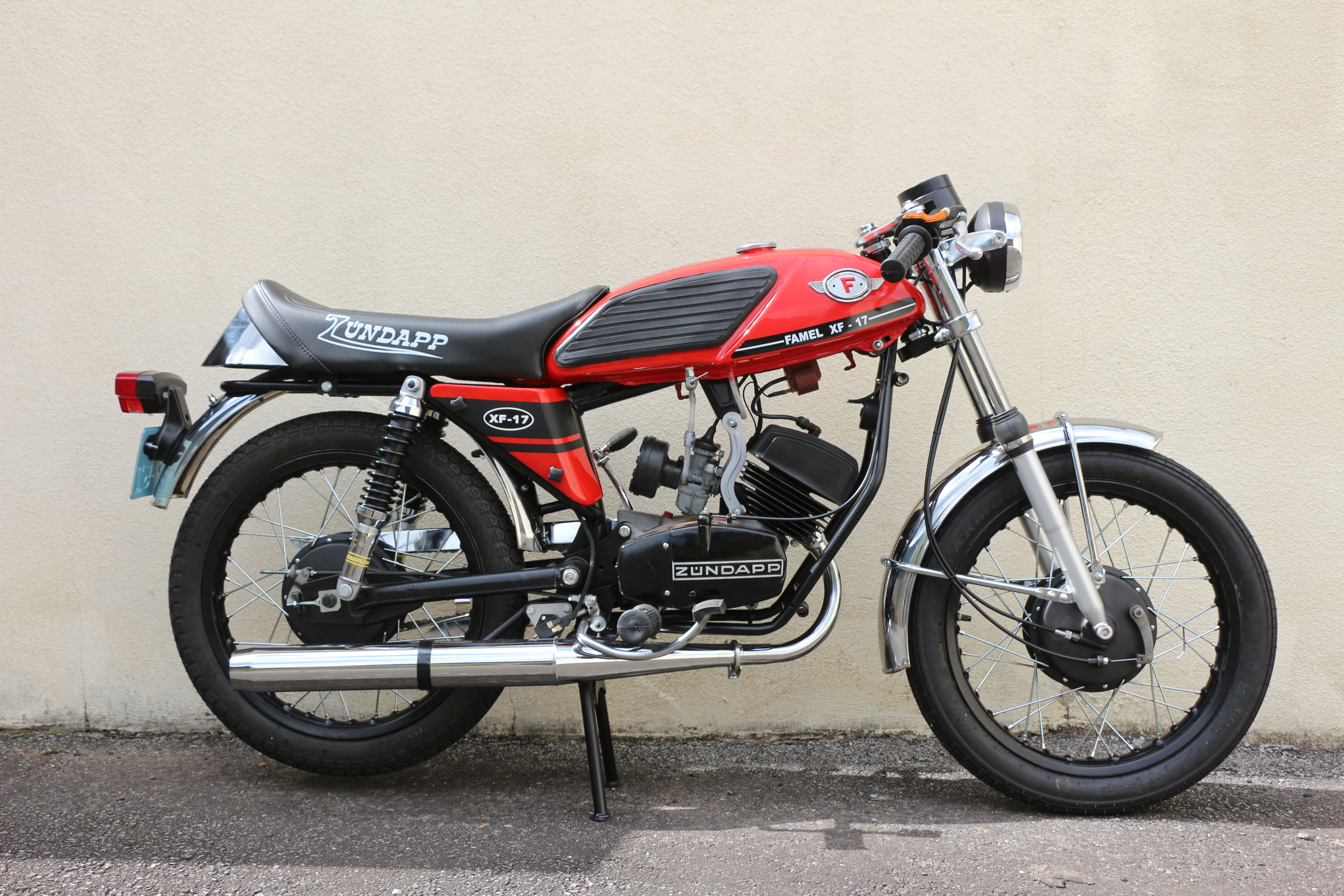
Famel XF 17 - 1987

It was a 5 speed 50 cc (3.1 cu in) moped based in the Suzuki Stinger T125 which was produced from 1969 to 1971 (and which was powered by a 15 hp (11 kW) (claimed) @ 8,500rpm engine. As the increased purchasing power in their home country Portugal made automobiles more and more popular, the moped market became smaller and the strong competition from European and Japanese imported models forced bankruptcy.

The company's last product, the Famel Electric, or Electron, was the world's first electric scooter. It was developed in 1993. with Portuguese technology in partnership with EFACEC. The entire (small) production was sold to La Poste before FAMEL stopped production. The following year, Peugeot presented their Scoot'elec based on the same technology.

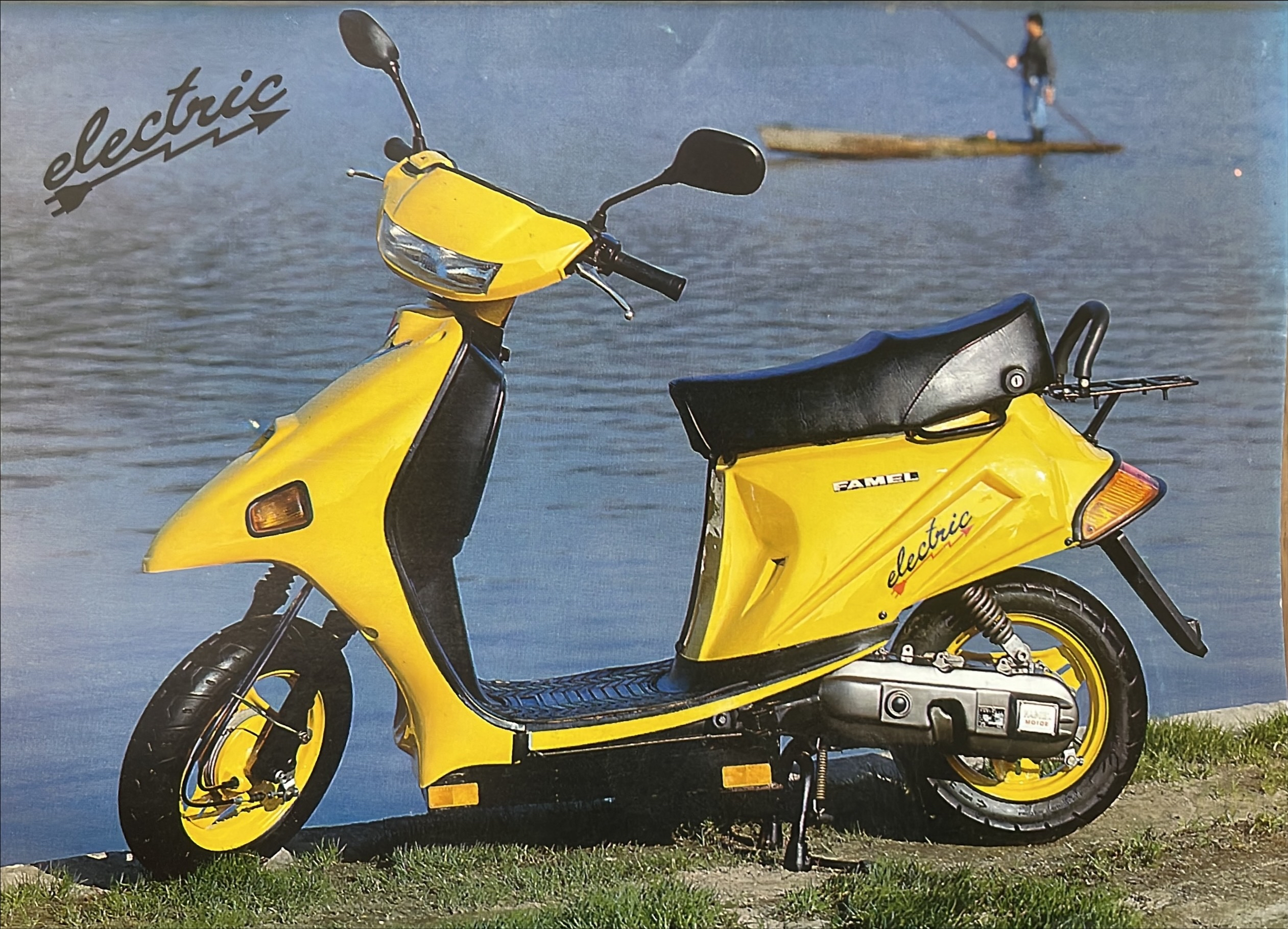
FAMEL Electron

After stopping production in 1994 due to financial problems, Famel was declared bankrupt in 2002.

== Famel Reborn ==
After being declared insolvent in 2002, the brand remained forgotten until 2014, when its revitalization was announced through an electric mobility project that over time presented evolutions and developments of models that culminated in 2022 with the presentation of two versions of prototypes inspired by the old XF-17, but now with electric motorization. The forecast for the start of commercialization is scheduled for 2024.

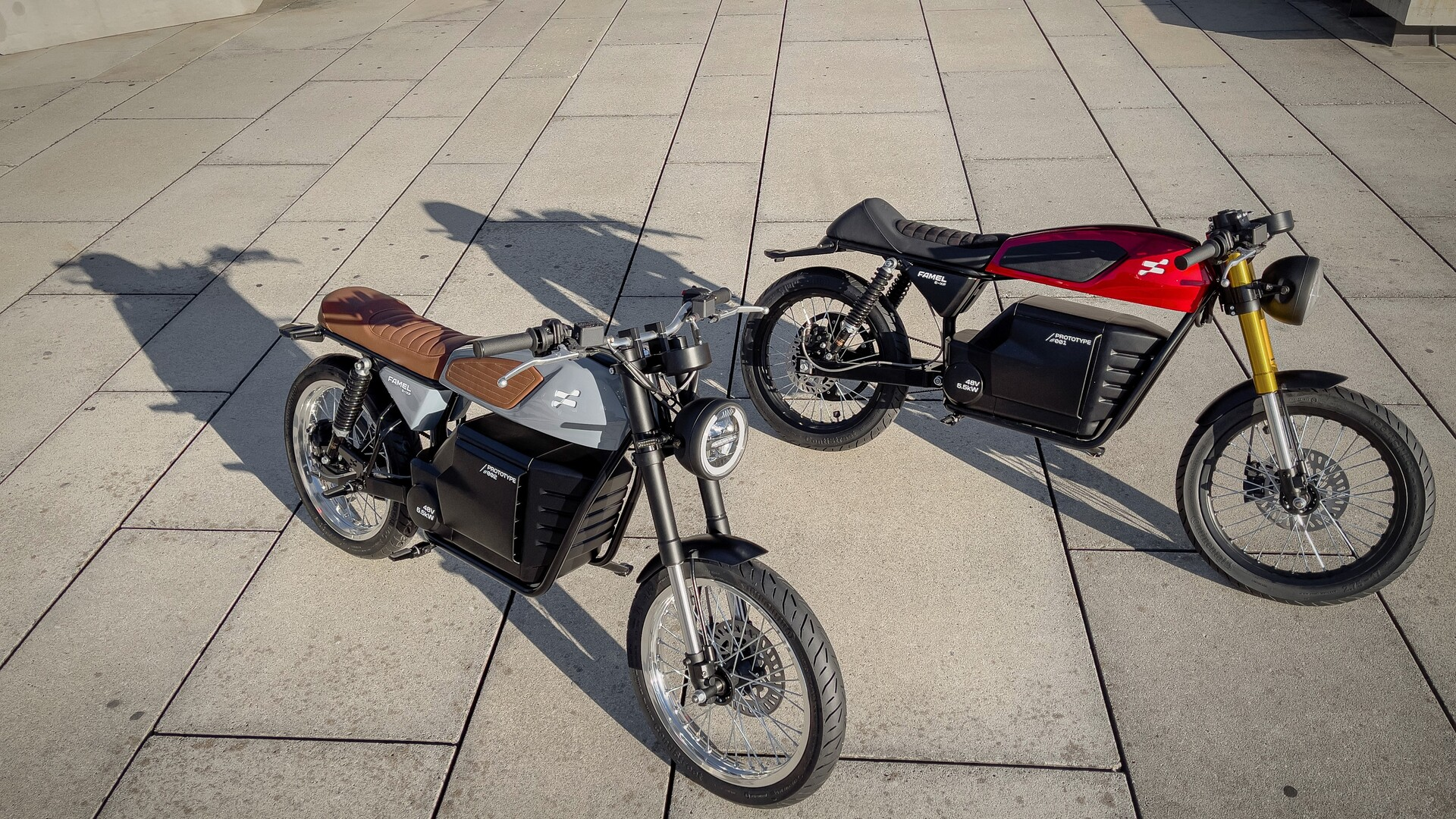
FAMEL E-XF Classic & Café Racer
