= Marcelino da Mata =

Portuguese military personnel (1940–2021)

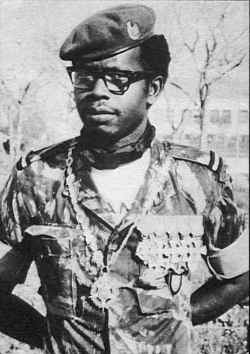
- Marcelino da Mata, 1969
- Born: May 7, 1940; Ponte Nova, Portuguese Guinea
- Died: February 11, 2021 (aged 80); Amadora-Sintra, Portugal
- Military career
- Allegiance: Portugal
- Branch: Portuguese Army
- Service years: 1960–1990
- Rank: Lieutenant-Colonel
- Unit: Portuguese Commandos
- Conflicts: Portuguese Colonial War
- Awards: Order of the Tower and Sword; Five War Crosses; Multiple Campaign Medals

Marcelino da Mata (7 May 1940 – 11 February 2021) was a Portuguese Army officer born in Portuguese Guinea. He was the most decorated soldier in the history of the Portuguese Army.

During the Portuguese Colonial War (1961–1974), he participated in 2,412 military operations, primarily in Portuguese Guinea.

== Early life ==
Marcelino da Mata was born in Ponte Nova, Portuguese Guinea (present-day Guinea-Bissau). He belonged to the Papel ethnic group and completed his secondary education locally before joining the Portuguese Army in the early 1960s.

He enlisted after his brother was conscripted, volunteering in his place.

== Military career ==
Da Mata served primarily in Portuguese Guinea during the Portuguese Colonial War. He became one of the early members of the Portuguese Commandos, an elite special operations unit established to conduct counterinsurgency missions.

Over approximately eleven years of combat service, he participated in 2,412 military operations. Notable operations included:

- Operation Tridente
- Operation Mar Verde

He received five War Crosses (Cruz de Guerra) for acts of bravery and was appointed to the Order of the Tower and Sword, Portugal’s highest military decoration for valor.

He rose through the ranks to Lieutenant-Colonel, an uncommon achievement for an African-born officer in the Portuguese Army during the late colonial period.

== Carnation Revolution and later life ==
Following the Carnation Revolution in April 1974 and the independence of Portuguese Guinea (Guinea-Bissau), da Mata remained in Portugal. During this period, he was temporarily detained amid broader military restructuring.

== Personal life ==
Da Mata lived in mainland Portugal following Guinea-Bissau’s independence and resided in the municipality of Amadora.

== Death ==
Marcelino da Mata died on 11 February 2021 at the Professor Doutor Fernando Fonseca Hospital (Amadora-Sintra Hospital) in Amadora, Portugal, due to complications related to COVID-19.

His funeral was attended by senior military officials and was publicly acknowledged by President Marcelo Rebelo de Sousa.

== Legacy ==
Within Portuguese military circles, da Mata is recognized as the most decorated soldier in the country’s history. His career is frequently cited in discussions of elite commando operations during the Portuguese Colonial War.

Historians and commentators note that his legacy is intertwined with the complex and contested history of Portuguese colonialism and the independence struggles in Africa.

== Decorations ==
- Order of the Tower and Sword, of Valor, Loyalty and Merit
- Five War Crosses
- Campaign Medals for Overseas Service

== See also ==
- Portuguese Colonial War
- Portuguese Commandos
- Guinea-Bissau War of Independence
