= Wind of Change (speech) =

1960 speech by British Prime Minister Harold Macmillan

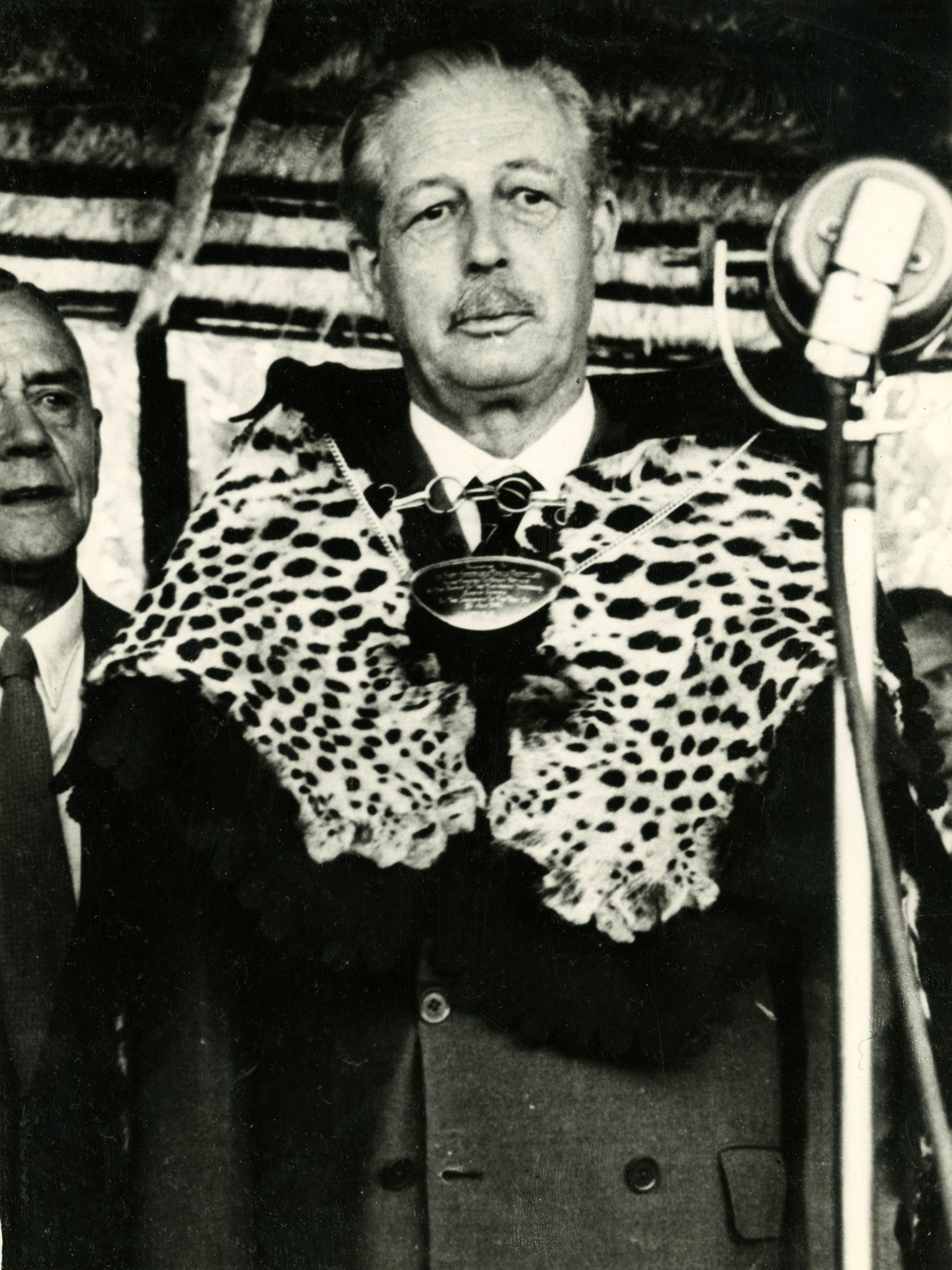
Harold Macmillan in Pietersburg, Northern Transvaal in 1960

The "Wind of Change" speech was an address made by British Prime Minister Harold Macmillan to the Parliament of South Africa on 3 February 1960 in Cape Town. He had spent a month in Africa in visiting a number of British colonies. When the Labour Party was in government from 1945 to 1951, it had started a process of decolonisation, but the policy had been halted or at least slowed down by the Conservative governments since 1951. Macmillan's speech signalled that the Conservative Party, which formed the British government, would no longer impede independence for many of those territories.

The speech acquired its name from a quotation embedded in it:

The wind of change is blowing through this continent. Whether we like it or not, this growth of national consciousness is a political fact.

The occasion was actually the second time Macmillan had delivered the speech. He first gave it in Accra, Ghana (formerly the British colony of the Gold Coast) on 10 January 1960, where it drew little response. However, its delivery in Cape Town received significant press attention, partly due to the cold and uneasy reception it received in a country then governed by apartheid and white minoritarianism. The speech made clear that Macmillan’s remarks extended to South Africa itself and signalled a shift in British policy towards apartheid:

As a fellow member of the Commonwealth it is our earnest desire to give South Africa our support and encouragement, but I hope you won't mind my saying frankly that there are some aspects of your policies which make it impossible for us to do this without being false to our own deep convictions about the political destinies of free men to which in our own territories we are trying to give effect.

The speech is also commonly referred to as the "Winds of Change" speech, although "wind" was singular in the original. Macmillan himself titled the first volume of his memoirs Winds of Change (1966).

== Background ==
Harold Macmillan, leader of the Conservative Party, was the British prime minister from 1957 to 1963. He presided over a time of increasing national prosperity and the easing of Cold War tensions. However, the British Empire, which had spanned a quarter of the world in 1921, was beginning to become financially unsustainable to the British government. Spurred by increasing nationalism in Africa and in Asia, the government made the decision to initiate the process of decolonisation by granting the empire's various colonies independence.

The British Empire had begun its dissolution after the end of the Second World War. Many in Britain had come to the conclusion that running the empire had become more trouble than it was worth. International factors which contributed to that conclusion and helped to initiate decolonisation included the fear of Soviet penetration into Africa. The United States was putting pressure on the United Kingdom; the U.S. government wanted Britain to decolonise to gain access to new markets and resources, and also believed that decolonisation was necessary to prevent communism becoming an attractive option to African nationalist movements.

Meanwhile, African nationalists were becoming increasingly demanding in their initiative for self-rule. The path to majority rule in Southern Africa proved more problematic because the white populations of the British and Portuguese colonies and of the Union of South Africa, a self-governing dominion, were hostile towards the idea of black majority rule.

The independence of British Somaliland in 1960, along with the "Wind of Change" speech that Macmillan delivered in South Africa earlier that same year, marked the start of a decade in which the dismantling of the British Empire reached its climax, with 27 former colonies in Asia, Africa and the Caribbean becoming independent nations.

== African nationalism ==
African nationalism escalated during the Second World War. The British needed secure control over their African colonies for resources to fight the Axis powers. For their help throughout the war, the African colonies wanted to receive rewards in the form of political and economic opportunity. They became bitter when those rewards were not presented to them and so they started to campaign for independence.

The British West African colony of the Gold Coast had become a place of great promise for the African independence movement in the 1950s, since its average level of education was the highest in all of Sub-Saharan Africa, and its people strongly supported the independence movement. The Gold Coast nationalists had campaigned for home rule even before the Second World War, before most other colonies of the British Empire had initiated the process of decolonization. After the war, Kwame Nkrumah's Convention People's Party (CPP) orchestrated a campaign of civil disobedience in support of self-government. In the 1951 election, the CPP won 34 of 38 seats; Nkrumah became prime minister, and the colony became independent under Nkrumah's leadership as Ghana in 1957.

Meanwhile, in other colonies of Africa the desire for independence was countered by opposition from white settlers, who generally dominated the colonies politically and economically. They asserted their dominance by their denial of universal suffrage to Africans and by efforts to persuade the British government to consolidate colonial territories into federations. However, the white settler minority could not contain the sense of African nationalism. There were warnings that without a quick transfer of power, African nationalism would undermine colonial rule anyway. To obtain co-operation from the new African governments, the British government would need to decolonise and grant them independence or at least self-rule, which was thought by the British to be a good substitute for direct control of the area.

By 1960, Macmillan's Conservative government was becoming worried about the effects of violent confrontations with African nationalists in the Belgian Congo and French Algeria. The Conservatives feared that violent activity would spill over into the British colonies. Macmillan went to Africa to circulate and deliver his "Wind of Change" speech, which is named for its line: "The wind of change is blowing through this continent and whether we like it or not, this growth of national consciousness is a political fact. We must all accept it as a fact, and our national policies must take account of it". Soon after the speech, Iain Macleod, Colonial Secretary (1959-1961), decreased the original timetable for independence in East Africa by a decade. Independence was granted to Tanganyika in 1961, Uganda in 1962 and Kenya in 1963.

== Consequences ==
In South Africa, the speech was received with discomfort. Besides restating the policy of decolonisation, the speech marked political shifts that were to occur within the next year or so, in the Union of South Africa and the United Kingdom. The formation of the Republic of South Africa in 1961 was followed by the country's departure from the Commonwealth of Nations, partially the result of Britain's withdrawal of support for apartheid declared in Macmillan's speech, coupled with further condemnation by other countries in the Commonwealth such as India and Canada.

There was an extended backlash against the speech from the right-wing of the Conservative Party, which wished for Britain to retain its colonial possessions. The speech led directly to the formation of the Conservative Monday Club, a right-wing pressure group.

== Original delivery and impact in South Africa ==
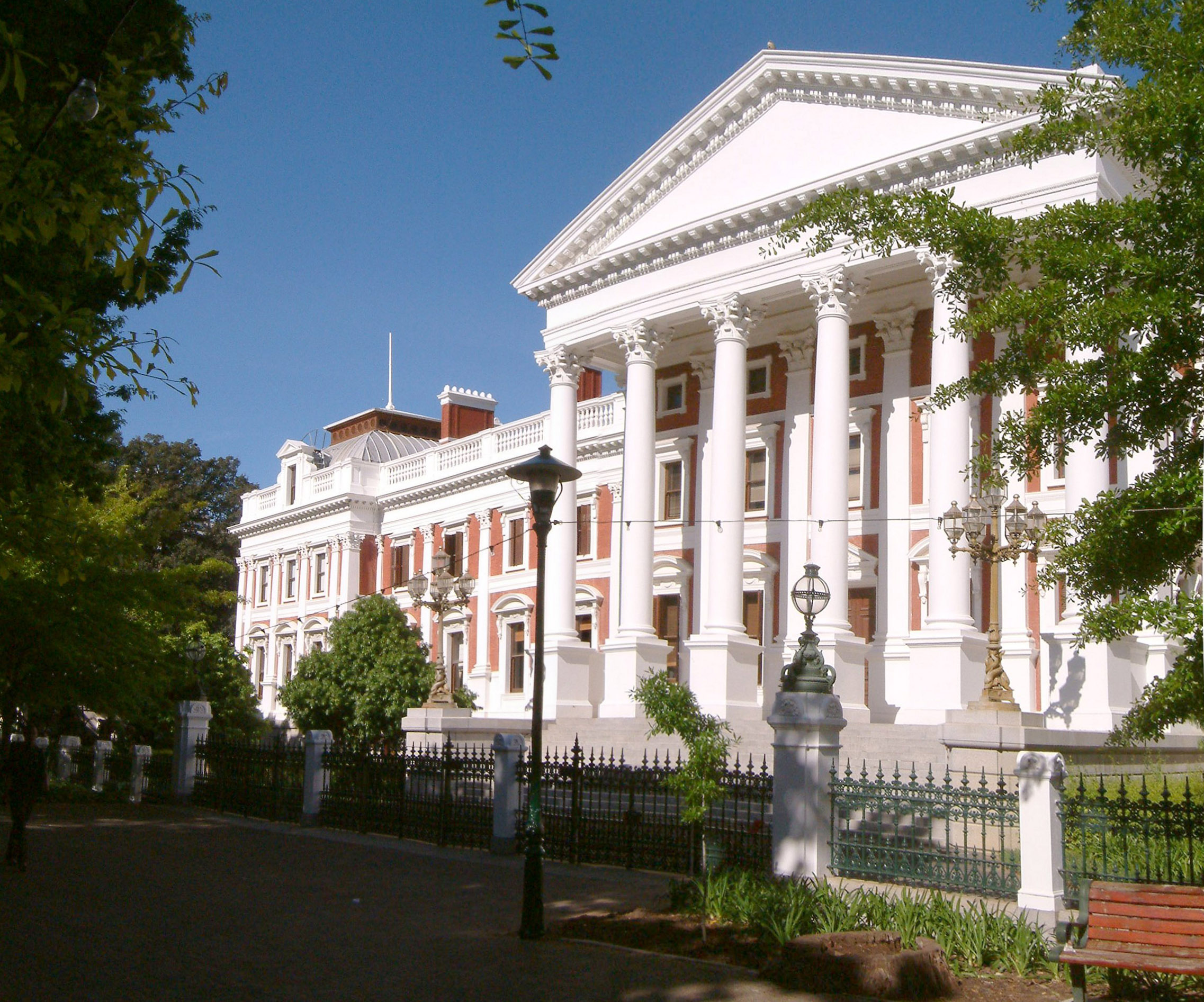
The South African Houses of Parliament in Cape Town, where the speech was originally delivered.

The year 1960 was rife with change. It had the surprising announcement by South African Prime Minister Hendrik Verwoerd that a referendum would be held on whether South Africa should become a republic. After Macmillan's speech on 3 February, there was an assassination attempt made against Verwoerd on 9 April. Later, the African National Congress (ANC) and Pan-Africanist Congress (PAC) were declared illegal in a state of emergency, along with other controversies. Macmillan did not compose the speech commonly known as the "Winds of Change" himself, but had input from numerous friends and colleagues who helped derive the perfect wording for the delicate situation. He wanted to separate the British nation but also to inspire the black nationalists there to pursue their freedom and equality subtly. The other hidden motive was that there was much pressure from the U.S. government for all European nations to initiate decolonisation. By announcing to the world that Britain was fully committed to the process of decolonisation, he opened it up to more political opportunity. The speech was a bold attempt to address multiple parties and interests at once.

Before he delivered the speech, Macmillan went on a six-week tour of Africa that began on 5 January. He began with Ghana, Nigeria, Rhodesia and Nyasaland and then South Africa, where the meeting finally happened with Verwoerd. Macmillan tried to explain the necessity of change brought upon them by the two world wars.

Macmillan delivered his speech for multiple reasons. The speech related mainly to the separation of Britain from its South African colonies, but it also referred to discontent with the system of apartheid, and held positive political results for the British government. The speech held the promise of major policy change on the topic of their decolonisation, and it was actually delivered twice in two different locations. It was first given in Ghana, but there was no press coverage, and few people even attended the event in Accra. The second delivery, more widely reported, occurred on 3 February in Cape Town, and was met with very mixed reviews.

If the speech would be judged on its quality of delivery and content, it would be considered a success. When considering if the speech was successful, one must place it next to its objectives. Since it lays down a relatively clear understanding of Britain's intended exit as a colonial power in Africa, it achieved its purpose in the larger scheme. However, since there are indications that Macmillan's intent was to sway White South Africans to abandon Verwoerd's apartheid dogma, that part of the speech was a failure. The speech was an important moment to have such a distinguished and powerful figure from the Western world admonishing the practices and encouraging the black nationalists to achieve equality, but it still was not as groundbreaking or immediately effective as was the implied intent.

There was some belief that the policy outlined in the speech was seen as "British abdication in Africa" and "the cynical abandonment of white settlers". Not everyone felt that it was the right move for Britain to make. There was an ambiguous reaction from some of the black nationalists, who had been prevented from meeting Macmillan (presumably by Verwoerd) over the course of his visit and were skeptical about his speech at first. Small groups of ANC supporters gathered in both Johannesburg and Cape Town, and stood in silence while they held placards with urgings directed at Macmillan. They wanted him to talk with Congress leaders, and reached out to him with banners saying, "Mac, Verwoerd is not our leader". It is even said that Mandela thought the speech was "terrific"; he later made a speech before the British Parliament in 1996 that specifically recalled Macmillan's address. Also, Albert Luthuli noted that in the speech, Macmillan gave African people "some inspiration and hope".

Some people indicated that Macmillan was very nervous for the entire speech. He would turn the pages with obvious difficulty, since he was knowingly presenting a speech that he had intentionally withheld from Verwoerd. He had declined to give Verwoerd an advance copy, but merely summed up the main content.

When the speech was complete, there was visible shock on Verwoerd's face. He apparently leapt up from his seat and immediately responded to Macmillan. He was reportedly calm and collected when he gave his response, which was widely admired by the public. He had to save face when Macmillan had dropped a ticking time bomb into the speech, but he managed to respond quickly and well in a game of words to which he was not accustomed. He famously responded by saying, "There must not only be justice to the Black man in Africa, but also to the White man". He said that the Europeans had no other home, for Africa was their home now too, and that they also were taking a strong stand against communism, for their ways were grounded in Christian values. Saul Dubow stated, "The unintended effect of the speech was to help empower Verwoerd by reinforcing his dominance over domestic politics and by assisting him make two hitherto separate strands of his political career seem mutually reinforcing: republican nationalism on the one hand and apartheid ideology on the other".

Today, the draft and the final copies of the speech are housed in University of Oxford's Bodleian Library.

== British reactions and attitudes at home ==
Most of the reaction following the speech can be seen as a direct response from Conservatives within the British government at the time. Macmillan's speech can officially be seen as a declaration of a change in policy regarding the British Empire, but prior government actions had already moved towards a slow process of decolonisation in Africa. However, that gradual policy of relinquishing colonies owned by the Central African Federation was originally intended to target only areas in West Africa. Areas outside of that particular confinement with European inhabitants were not at first seen as threatened by the gradual decolonisation initiated by the British government. As such, the aftermath of Macmillan's speech brought not only great surprise but also a feeling of betrayal and distrust by members of the Conservative Party at the time. Lord Kilmuir, a member of Macmillan's Cabinet at the time of the speech, went on to regard:

Few utterances in recent history have had more grievous consequences... in Kenya the settlers spoke bitterly of a betrayal, and the ministers of the Federation approached the British government with equal suspicion.

These feelings not only resounded with European settlers in the African colonies but also were shared by members of Macmillan's own party who felt that he had taken the party line down the wrong direction. That was illustrated through the speed and scale with which decolonisation occurred. Following the speech, the British government felt pressure from within from economic and political interests surrounding the colonies. Lord Salisbury, another member of the Conservative Party, felt that European settlers in Kenya, alongside the African populace, would prefer to remain under British rule regardless.

Prior to the speech, the Federation government had dismissed suggestions that black-majority rule would be the best action in the colonies of Northern Rhodesia and Nyasaland. Because the copperbelt ran through Northern Rhodesia, economic interests presented themselves as an opponent to decolonisation. That example can help to illustrate some of the feelings of resentment and betrayal felt by fellow members of the Conservative Party after Macmillan's speech. Additionally, the fear that Britain would appear weak or unstable by a rapid decolonisation of her various colonies was of great concern to many Conservatives at the time of the speech. Although Macmillan argued in his oration that Britain's power had not faded, the economic effects if the empire was seen as weak would prove worrisome.

On the other hand, other British reactions were concerned with whether the speech truly carried an authentic tone. In the speech, Macmillan addressed British opposition to apartheid; the fact that the address was officially made in South Africa left media outlets in Britain to question whether there would be any sort of immediate change in policy. Alongside the issue of apartheid, the process of decolonisation as indicated by Macmillan brought forth questions regarding the legitimacy and responsibilities of colonial powers once the colonies had been granted independence. Many felt that countries such as Ghana, which were among the first to be granted independence from British rule, were decolonised so quickly only by a lack of economic interests pushing against decolonisation. Those factors not only created a clash of ideals at home between conservative forces and those who wished to initiate the process of decolonisation but also worked to complicate relations between Britain and other nations.

== Conservative Monday Club ==
As a result of the "Wind of Change" speech, Members of Parliament formed the Conservative Monday Club in attempts to debate party policy change and prevent decolonisation. The motivation behind the group also was founded on the notion that Macmillan had not accurately represented the party's original aims and goals. As a result, the members of the organisation rigidly opposed decolonisation in all forms and represented the feelings of betrayal and distrust following foreign policy changes after the "Wind of Change" speech. Many Conservatives saw the speech as another step towards a complete dismantling of the empire. The Conservative Monday Club was founded as a direct result of Macmillan's address and as such the reaction of the Conservative Party at home can be seen as both resentful and distrustful of Macmillan.
