= 1909 in Portugal =

- Centuries: 18th; 19th; 20th; 21st
- Decades: 1880s; 1890s; 1900s; 1910s; 1920s
- See also: List of years in Portugal

Events in the year 1909 in Portugal.

== Incumbents ==
- Monarch: Emmanuel II
- Prime Minister: Artur de Campos Henriques (until 11 April); Sebastião Teles (11 April—14 May); Venceslau de Sousa Pereira de Lima (14 May–22 December); Francisco da Veiga Beirão (starting 22 December)

== Sports ==
- 26 October – The Olympic Committee of Portugal founded

== Births ==
- 11 February – João dos Santos, footballer.

== Deaths ==
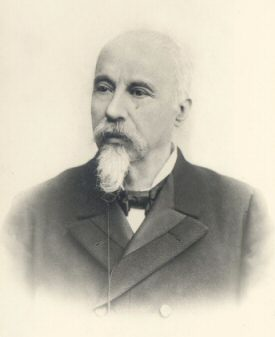
José Dias Ferreira

- 8 September – José Dias Ferreira, lawyer and politician (born 1837)
