= 1910 in Portugal =

- Decades: 1890s; 1900s; 1910s; 1920s; 1930s
- See also: History of Portugal; Timeline of Portuguese history; List of years in Portugal

Events in the year 1910 in Portugal.

== Incumbents ==
- Monarch: Emmanuel II (until 5 October)
- President: Teófilo Braga (President of the Provisional Government) (from 5 October)
- Prime Minister: Francisco da Veiga Beirão (until 26 June); António Teixeira de Sousa (26 June–5 October); Teófilo Braga (from 5 October)

== Events ==
- 28 August – Portuguese legislative election, 1910.
- 31 August – Gafanha da Nazaré is founded by Prior Sardo and becomes the last Portuguese town to receive a foral (royal charter) from the monarchy, granted by King Manuel II.
- 5 October – A coup d'état and proclamation of the Portuguese First Republic
- Disestablishment of the Progressive Dissidence political party.

== Sports ==
- S.C. Farense founded
- C.S. Marítimo founded
- Vitória F.C. founded
- C.D. Nacional founded

== Births ==
António de Spínola

- 1 April – Francisco Castro, Portuguese footballer (d. unknown)
- 11 April – António de Spínola, military officer, politician, writer (died 1996).
