= 1917 in Portugal =

- Centuries: 18th; 19th; 20th; 21st
- Decades: 1890s; 1900s; 1910s; 1920s; 1930s
- See also: List of years in Portugal

Events in the year 1917 in Portugal.

== Incumbents ==
- President: Bernardino Machado
- Prime Minister: Four different.

== Events ==
- 13 October – Miracle of the Sun near Fátima
- The Portuguese Naval Aviation established

== Sports ==
- Académico de Viseu FC founded

== Births ==
- 31 January – Manuel da Luz Afonso, football manager (d. 2000)
- 18 March – Joaquim Teixeira, footballer (d. unknown)
- 5 June – José Baptista Pinheiro de Azevedo, politician (d. 1983)
- 27 June – Artur Quaresma, footballer (d. 2011)
- 1 August – Manuel Soares Marques, footballer (d. 1987).
- 29 October – Virgílio Teixeira, actor (d. 2010)
- 22 December – Eduardo Lopes, cyclist (d.1997)

== Deaths ==
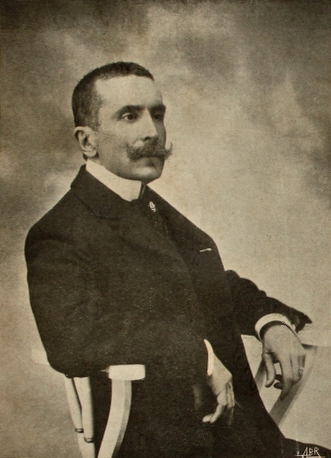
Abel Botelho

- 5 March – Manuel de Arriaga, lawyer and politician (born 1840)
- 18 March – António José de Ávila, 2nd Marquis of Ávila and Bolama, military officer, politician, nobility (b. 1842)
- 5 June – António Teixeira de Sousa, physician and politician (b. 1857)
- 6 November – António Júlio da Costa Pereira de Eça, Army general (b. 1852)

=== Full date missing ===
- Abel Botelho, military officer and diplomat (b. 1855)
- Hermenegildo Capelo, Navy officer (b. 1841)
- Guilherme de Vasconcelos Abreu, writer, cartographer and orientalist (b. 1842)
