= 1913 in Portugal =

- Centuries: 18th; 19th; 20th; 21st
- Decades: 1890s; 1900s; 1910s; 1920s; 1930s
- See also: List of years in Portugal

Events in the year 1913 in Portugal.

== Incumbents ==
- President: Manuel de Arriaga
- Prime Minister: Duarte Leite (until 9 January), Afonso Costa (from 9 January)

== Events ==
- Establishment of the Associação dos Escoteiros de Portugal

== Sport ==
- 1 November - Establishment of C.F. União

== Births ==
- Pedro de Merelim, historian, ethnographer (died 2002)
- Numídico Bessone, sculptor (died 1985)
- 16 April – José dos Santos Garcia, bishop (died 2010)
- 18 March – Pocas, footballer (died unknown)
- 10 May – João Villaret, actor (died 1961)
- 11 May – Edgar Cardoso, civil engineer, university professor (died 2000)
- 15 June – José Simões, footballer (died 1944)
- 7 July – Anatólio Falé, professor of music, musician, composer (died 1980)
- 27 July – António Martins, footballer (died unknown)
- 27 July – José Maria Antunes, footballer, manager (died 1991)
- 12 October – Vítor Guilhar, footballer (died unknown)
- 10 November – Álvaro Cunhal, politician (died 2005)

== Deaths ==
- Rita Amada de Jesus, nun
- 7 November - Manuel Moral y Vega, photographer, publisher (died in Peru)
- 27 December - Infanta Antónia of Portugal (died in the German Empire)
