= 1835 in Portugal =

- Centuries: 17th; 18th; 19th; 20th; 21st
- Decades: 1810s; 1820s; 1830s; 1840s; 1850s
- See also: List of years in Portugal

Events in the year 1835 in Portugal.

== Incumbents ==
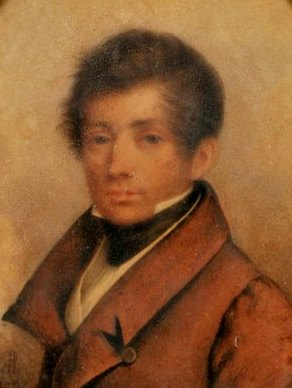
Vitório Maria de Sousa Coutinho, the second Portuguese Prime Minister

- Monarch: Mary II
- Prime Minister:
  - Pedro de Sousa Holstein (until 4 May)
  - Vitório Maria de Sousa Coutinho (4 May – 27 May)
  - João Carlos de Saldanha Oliveira e Daun (27 May – 18 November)
  - José Jorge Loureiro (18 November – )

== Events ==
- 18 April – The newspaper Açoriano Oriental was established

=== Titles created ===
- 12 May – Baron of São Cosme, a title in the Portuguese nobility
- 23 May – Viscount of Torre de Moncorvo, a title created by Queen Maria II as a barony by decree
- 21 July – Viscount of Banho, an hereditary title created by Queen Maria II
- 17 September – Viscount of Vilarinho de São Romão, a title created by Queen Maria II

== Births ==
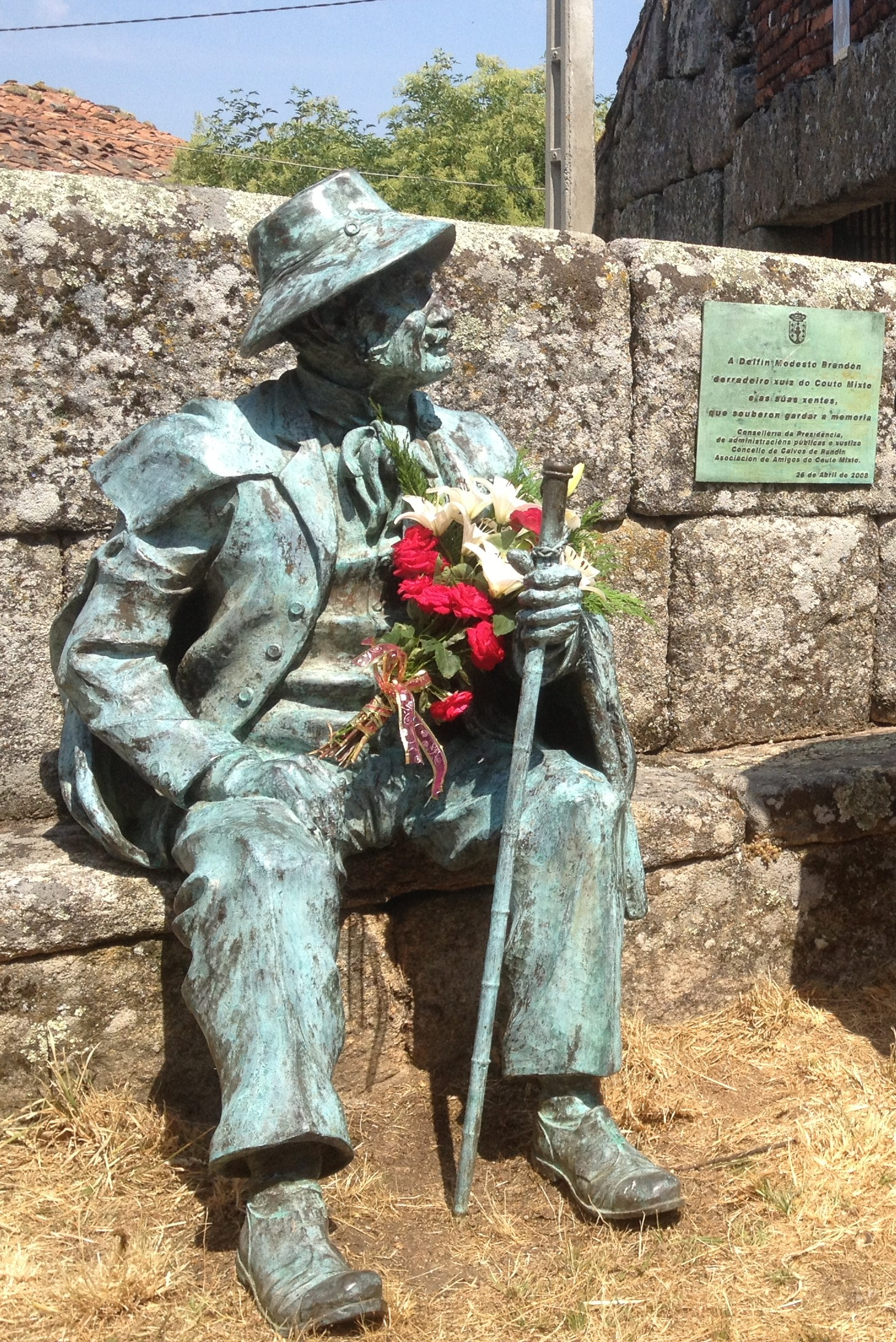
Statue of Delfim Modesto Brandão

- 30 January – António Lopes Mendes, explorer and agronomist (d. 1894)
- 10 November – Manuel António de Sousa, Portuguese merchant and military officer of Goan origin (d. 1892).

=== Full date missing ===
- Delfim Modesto Brandão, "Juiz" (head of state) of the Couto Misto

== Deaths ==
- 28 March – Auguste, Duke of Leuchtenberg, the first prince consort of Maria II of Portugal (b. 1810)
