= 1908 in Portugal =

- Centuries: 18th; 19th; 20th; 21st
- Decades: 1880s; 1890s; 1900s; 1910s; 1920s
- See also: List of years in Portugal

Events in the year 1908 in Portugal.

== Incumbents ==
- Monarch: Charles I (until 1 February), then Emmanuel II
- Prime Minister: João Franco (until 4 February); Francisco Ferreira do Amaral (4 February–26 December); Artur de Campos Henriques (starting 26 December)

== Events ==
- 28 January – Municipal Library Elevator Coup
- 1 February – The Lisbon Regicide, assassination of King Carlos I of Portugal and Luís Filipe, Prince Royal of Portugal
- 5 April – Portuguese legislative election, 1908.

== Births ==
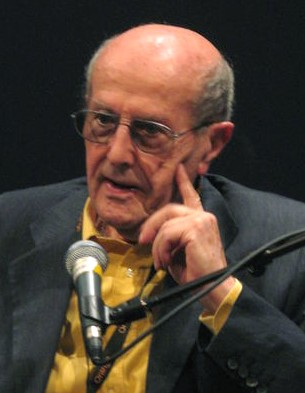
Manoel de Oliveira

- 13 March – Maria Helena Vieira da Silva, abstract painter (died 1992)
- 11 June – Francisco Marto, Marian apparition witness, beatified (died 1919)
- 11 December – Manoel de Oliveira, film director (died 2015)

== Deaths ==
- 1 February
  - Carlos I of Portugal, king (born 1863)
  - Luís Filipe, Prince Royal of Portugal, prince (born 1887)
