= 1915 in Portugal =

- Decades: 1890s; 1900s; 1910s; 1920s; 1930s
- See also: History of Portugal; Timeline of Portuguese history; List of years in Portugal

Events in the year 1915 in Portugal.

== Incumbents ==
- President: Manuel de Arriaga (until 26 May), Teófilo Braga (from 29 May to 5 August), Bernardino Machado (from 6 August)
- Prime Minister: Victor Hugo de Azevedo Coutinho (until 25 January), Joaquim Pimenta de Castro (from 25 January to 14 May), Revolutionary Junta (from 14 to 15 May), João Pinheiro Chagas (from 15 to 17 May), José de Castro (from 17 May to 29 November), Afonso Costa (from 29 November)

== Events ==
- 14 May - May 14 Revolt
- 29 May – Teófilo Braga becomes president of Portugal.
- 13 June - Legislative election
- 8 August - Establishment of the Catholic Centre Party.

== Arts and entertainment ==
- 21 April - Establishment of the Theatre Circo

== Sport ==
- 25 December - Establishment of Varzim S.C.

== Births ==
- 5 February - Tereza de Arriaga, painter (died 2013)
- 28 February - António da Mota Veiga, politician, law professor (died 2005)
- 5 April - Rafael Correia, footballer (died 1958)
- 29 April - Francisco Moreira, footballer (died 1991)
- 11 May - Aníbal Paciência, footballer (died unknown)
- 10 July - João Azevedo, footballer (died 1991)
- 7 August - Mariano Amaro, footballer (died 1987)
- 18 August - Manuel Guimarães, filmmaker (died 1975)
- 31 October - João Cruz, footballer (died 1981)
- 26 November - Margarida de Abreu, choreographer (died 2006)
- 29 December - Alberto Gomes, footballer (died 1992)

== Deaths ==
- 27 September - Ramalho Ortigão, writer
