= 1916 in Portugal =

- Centuries: 18th; 19th; 20th; 21st
- Decades: 1890s; 1900s; 1910s; 1920s; 1930s
- See also: List of years in Portugal

Events in the year 1916 in Portugal.

== Incumbents ==
- President: Bernardino Machado
- Prime Minister: Afonso Costa (until 16 March); António José de Almeida (starting 16 March)

== Events ==
- Portugal enters the First World War.

== Arts and entertainment ==
- Grão Vasco Museum founded

== Sports ==
- Caldas Sport Clube founded

== Births ==
- 8 June – Emílio Lino, fencer (died 1958).

== Deaths ==
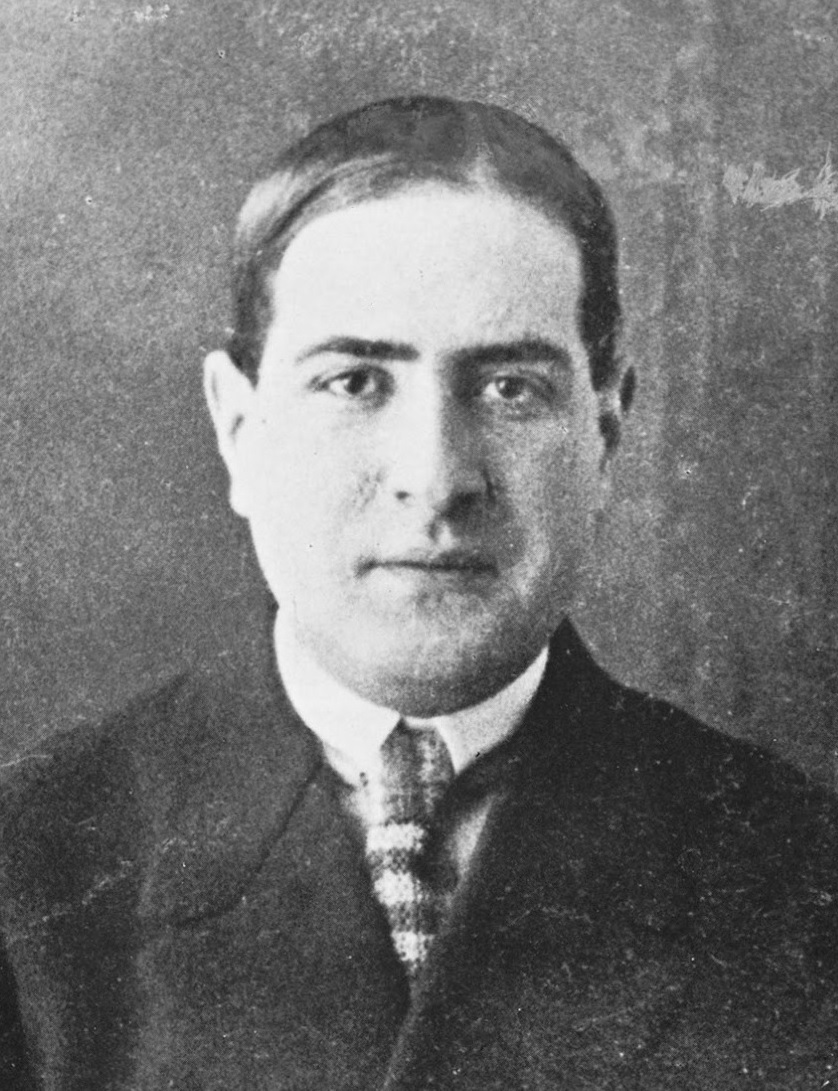
Mário de Sá-Carneiro

- 16 April – Mário de Sá-Carneiro, writer (born 1890)
- 11 November – Francisco da Veiga Beirão, politician (born 1841)
