= Manuel, Duke of Beja =

Manuel, Duke of Beja may refer to:

- Manuel I of Portugal or Manuel I of Beja, Duke of Beja
- Manuel II of Portugal or Manuel II of Beja, Duke of Beja
