= 1841 in Portugal =

- Centuries: 17th; 18th; 19th; 20th; 21st
- Decades: 1820s; 1830s; 1840s; 1850s; 1860s
- See also: List of years in Portugal

Events in the year 1841 in Portugal.

== Incumbents ==
- Monarch: Mary II
- Prime Minister: José Travassos Valdez, 1st Count of Bonfim (until 9 June); Joaquim António de Aguiar

== Events ==
- 9 June – de Aguiar takes over as prime minister after Valdez
- 15 June – 1841 "Caída da Praia" earthquake.

== Births ==
Francisco da Veiga Beirão

- 24 July – Francisco da Veiga Beirão, politician (died 1916)
