= 1914 in Portugal =

- Centuries: 18th; 19th; 20th; 21st
- Decades: 1890s; 1900s; 1910s; 1920s; 1930s
- See also: List of years in Portugal

Events in the year 1914 in Portugal.

== Incumbents ==
- President: Manuel de Arriaga
- Prime Minister: Afonso Costa (until 9 February); Bernardino Machado (9 February–12 December); Victor Hugo de Azevedo Coutinho (starting 12 December)

== Events ==
- 9 February – Bernardino Machado takes over as prime minister after Afonso Costa
- Integralismo Lusitano founded
- Establishment of the political party Monarchist Cause.

== Sports ==
- S.C. Espinho founded
- Portimonense S.C. founded
- U.F.C.I. Tomar founded
- Vilanovense F.C. founded

== Births ==
- 14 January – Álvaro Cardoso, footballer (d. 2004)
- 4 February – João Hogan, painter and printmaker (d. 1988)
- 30 June – Francisco da Costa Gomes, military officer and politician (d. 2001)
- 7 August – Mariano Amaro, footballer (d. 1987).
- 7 August – Kafunga, footballer (d. 1991)
- 9 August – Maria Keil, artist (d. 2012)
- 30 August – Joaquim Sampaio, sport shooter (d. unknown)
- 22 October – Constantino Esteves, film director (d. 1985)
- 20 December – Carlos Nunes, footballer (d. unknown)

=== Full date missing ===
- Maria José Marques da Silva, architect (d. 1996)

== Deaths ==
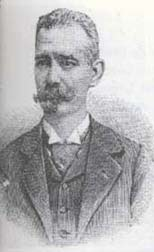
Aniceto dos Reis Gonçalves Viana

- 9 March – José Luciano de Castro, politician (b. 1834)
- 13 September – Aniceto dos Reis Gonçalves Viana, writer and orientalist (b. 1840)
