= 1912 in Portugal =

- Decades: 1890s; 1900s; 1910s; 1920s; 1930s
- See also: History of Portugal; Timeline of Portuguese history; List of years in Portugal

Events in the year 1912 in Portugal.

== Incumbents ==
- President: Manuel de Arriaga
- Prime Minister: Augusto de Vasconcelos (until 16 June), Duarte Leite (from 16 June)
- President of Chamber of Deputies: António Aresta Branco until 29 November; Vítor Macedo Pinto from 2 December
- President of Senate of the Republic: Anselmo Braamcamp Freire

== Events ==
- 6 January - Due to a violation of article 379 of the Penal Code, Bishop of the Algarve was prohibited from residing in his diocese for two years by Ministry of Justice António Macieira.
- 28 January - Inauguration of the Free University of Lisbon in a formal session at the Coliseu dos Recreios, in the presence of the President of the Republic, Manuel de Arriaga.
- 24 February - Establishment of the Republican Union and Evolutionist Party political parties.
- 8 July - Royalist attack on Chaves

== Sport ==
- Establishment of Clube de Futebol Esperança de Lagos
- Establishment of Leça F.C.
- Establishment of S.C. Olhanense
- Establishment of C.D. Olivais e Moscavide
- 5 May to 27 July - Portugal at the 1912 Summer Olympics

== Births ==
- 31 January - Maria Adelaide de Bragança, royal (d. 2012)
