= 1911 in Portugal =

- Centuries: 18th; 19th; 20th; 21st
- Decades: 1890s; 1900s; 1910s; 1920s; 1930s
- See also: List of years in Portugal

Events in the year 1911 in Portugal.

== Incumbents ==
- President: Teófilo Braga (President of the Provisional Government) (until 24 August), Manuel de Arriaga (from 24 August)
- Prime Minister: Teófilo Braga (until 3 September), João Pinheiro Chagas (from 3 September to 12 November), Augusto de Vasconcelos (from 12 November)

== Events ==
- Establishment of the University of Lisbon
- 22 March - Establishment of the University of Porto
- 22 May - Introduction of the Portuguese escudo
- 28 May - Constituent National Assembly election

== Arts and entertainment ==
- Establishment of the Chiado Museum

== Sport ==
- Establishment of CU Micaelense
- Establishment of Lusitano G.C.
- Establishment of Porto–Lisboa
- Establishment of the Taça José Monteiro da Costa
- 11 April - Establishment of F.C. Barreirense
- 15 September - Establishment of Académico F.C.
- 8 December - Establishment of S.C. Salgueiros
