= 1837 in Portugal =

- Centuries: 17th; 18th; 19th; 20th; 21st
- Decades: 1810s; 1820s; 1830s; 1840s; 1850s
- See also: List of years in Portugal

Events in the year 1837 in Portugal.

== Incumbents ==
- Monarch: Mary II
- Prime Minister: Bernardo de Sá Nogueira de Figueiredo, 1st Marquis of Sá da Bandeira

== Births ==
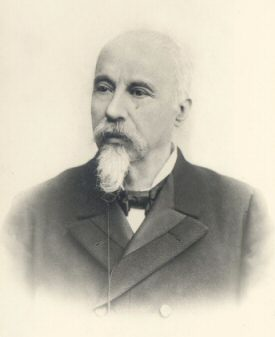
José Dias Ferreira

- 16 September – Pedro V of Portugal, king (died 1861)
- 30 November – José Dias Ferreira, lawyer and politician (died 1909)

== Deaths ==
- Domingos Sequeira, painter (b. 1768).
