= 1838 in Portugal =

- Centuries: 17th; 18th; 19th; 20th; 21st
- Decades: 1810s; 1820s; 1830s; 1840s; 1850s
- See also: List of years in Portugal

Events that happened in the year 1838 in Portugal.

== Incumbents ==
- Monarch: Mary II
- Prime Minister: Bernardo de Sá Nogueira de Figueiredo, 1st Marquis of Sá da Bandeira

== Births ==
- 31 October – Luís I of Portugal, king (died 1889)

== Deaths ==
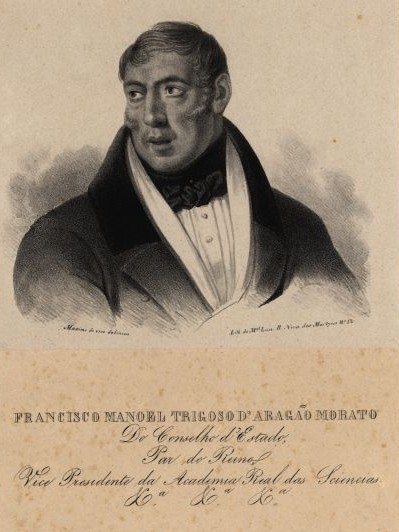
Francisco Manuel Trigoso

- 11 December — Francisco Manuel Trigoso, politician (b. 1777).
