= Baron of São Cosme =

Baron of São Cosme (Portuguese: Barão de São Cosme) was a title in the Portuguese nobility created on 12 May 1835 by Queen Maria II of Portugal. The first holder was João Nepomuceno de Macedo, born in Chamusca (15 May 1793), brigadier general of the liberal constitutionalist army during the Liberal Wars, Knight Commander of the Order of Aviz and of the Order of the Tower and Sword.

== List of barons/baronettes ==
1. D. João Nepomuceno de Macedo
2. D. Josefa Henriqueta Girão de Macedo, granddaughter of João Nepomunceno de Macedo and his wife D. Maria do Carmo de Souza Girão (from Santarém). She married on 28 August 1889 D. António de Portugal, natural son, legitimated, of the 13th Count of Vimioso.
3. D. Francisco de Paula Girão de Macedo de Portugal e Castro, by order of King Manuel II, in exile; # D. António Pizarro de Mello Sampayo de Macedo de Portugal e Castro, son of the third baron;
4. D. Francisco de Paula de Macedo de Portugal e Castro (born 8 May 1958).
