= 1843 in Portugal =

- Centuries: 17th; 18th; 19th; 20th; 21st
- Decades: 1820s; 1830s; 1840s; 1850s; 1860s
- See also: List of years in Portugal

Events in the year 1843 in Portugal.

== Incumbents ==
- Monarch: Mary II
- Prime Minister: António Bernardo da Costa Cabral, 1st Marquis of Tomar

== Births ==
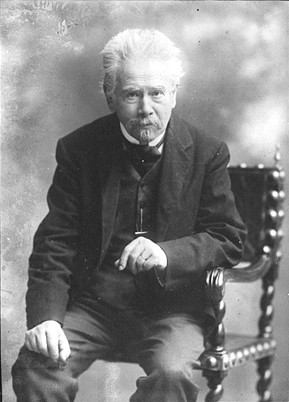
Teófilo Braga

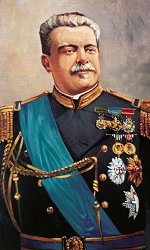
Francisco Joaquim Ferreira do Amaral

- 24 February – Teófilo Braga, playwright and politician (died 1924)
- 11 June – Francisco Joaquim Ferreira do Amaral, naval commander and politician (d. 1923).
- 21 July – Maria Ana de Bragança e Saxe-Coburgo-Gotha, Infanta de Portugal, princess (d. 1884).
