= 1834 in Portugal =

- Centuries: 17th; 18th; 19th; 20th; 21st
- Decades: 1810s; 1820s; 1830s; 1840s; 1850s
- See also: List of years in Portugal

Events in the year 1834 in Portugal.

== Incumbents ==
- Monarch: Michael I (until 26 May); Mary II
- Prime Minister: Pedro de Sousa Holstein, 1st Duke of Palmela

== Events ==
- 16 May – Battle of Asseiceira
- 26 May – Concession of Evoramonte, ending the civil war period; Miguel I of Portugal surrendered
- 30 May - Extinction of religious orders by D. Pedro and his minister Joaquim António de Aguiar
- 24 September – Pedro de Sousa Holstein, 1st Duke of Palmela becomes the first official prime minister of Portugal
- The National Republican Guard established

== Deaths ==
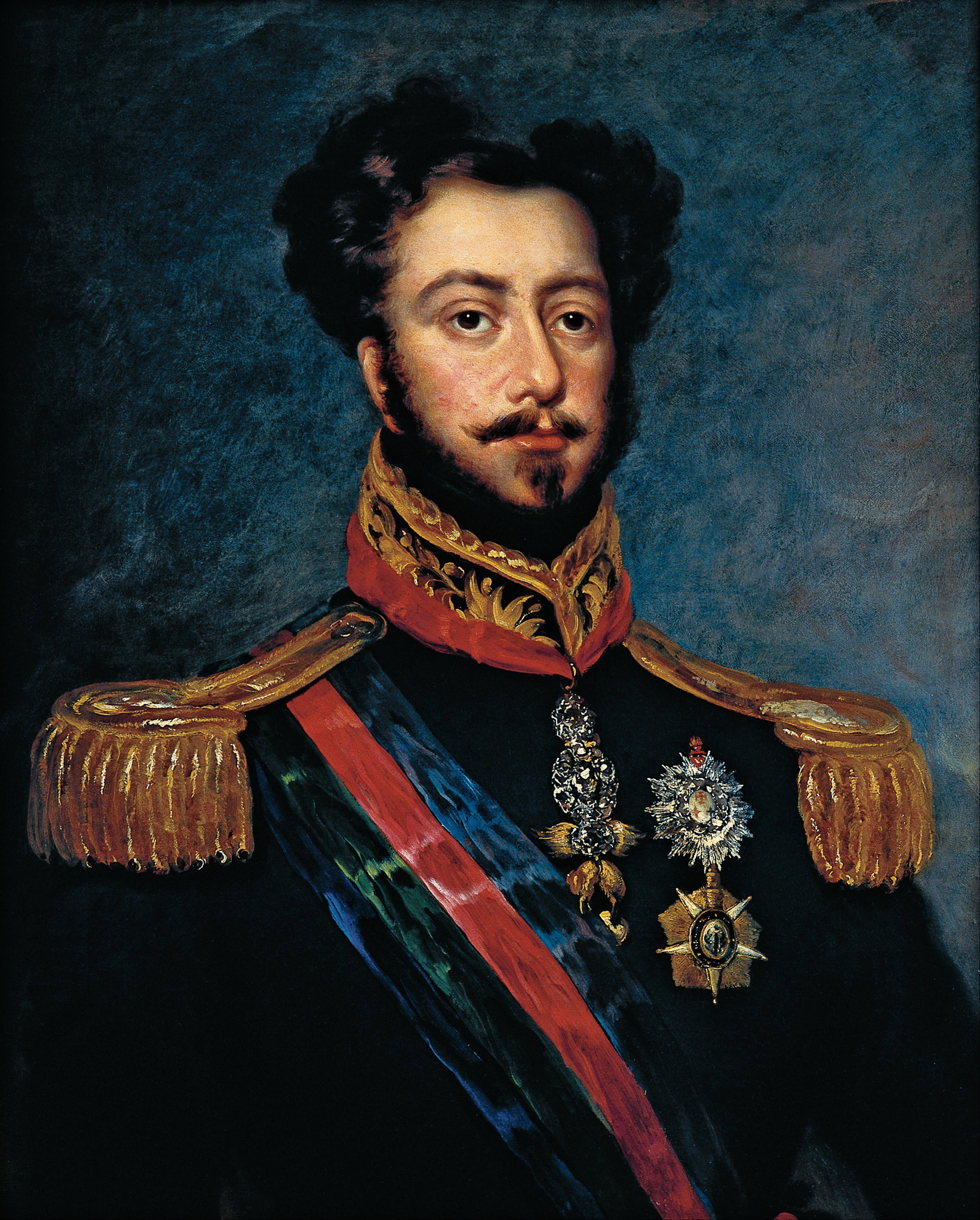
Pedro I of Brazil, or Pedro IV of Portugal.

- 24 September – King Dom Pedro IV, King of Portugal, Emperor of Brazil (born 1798).
