= Sebastião Teles =

Portuguese politician

General of division Sebastião Custódio de Sousa Teles
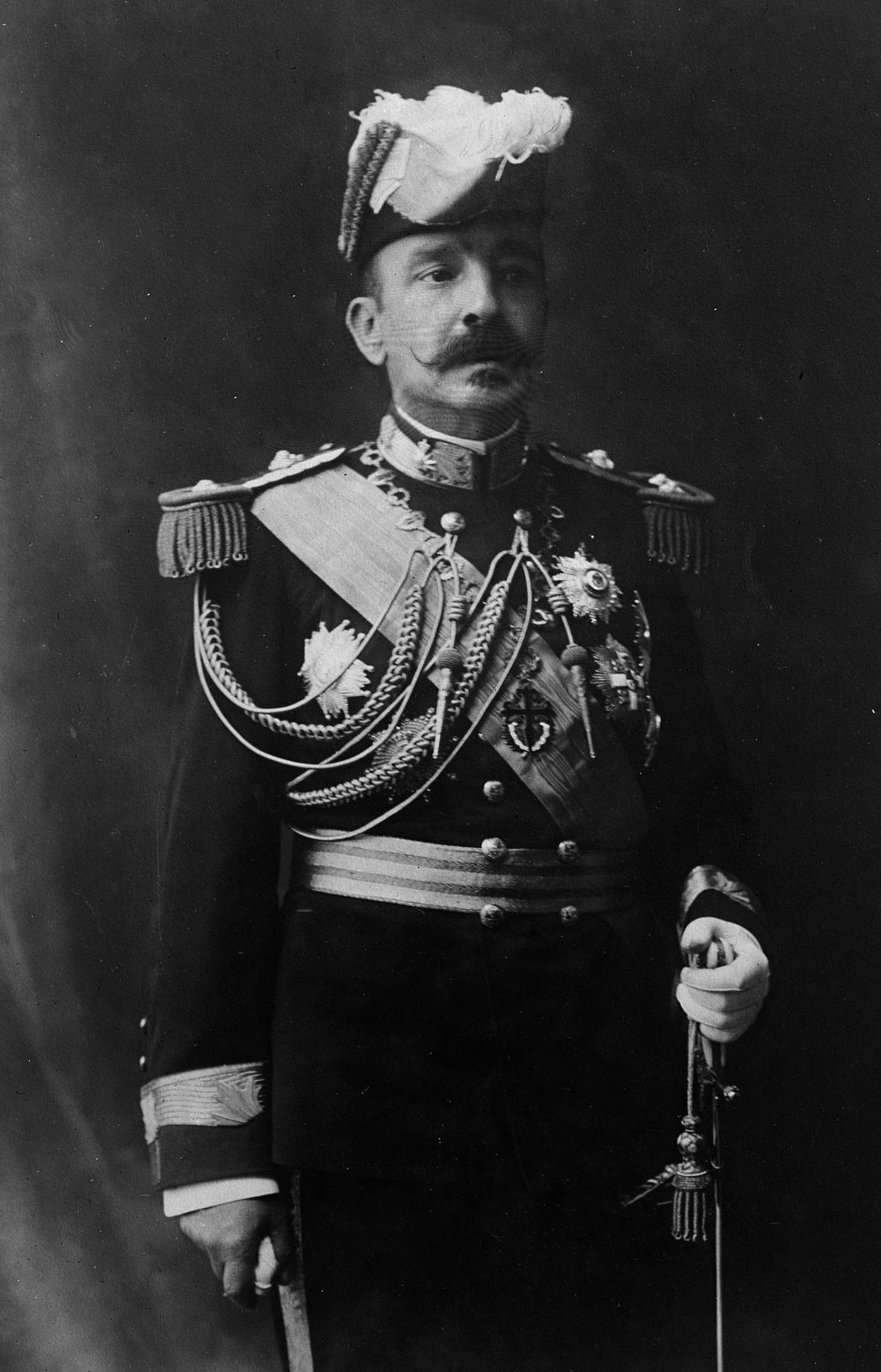
- Portrait as general by José Artur Leitão Bárcia, 1890-1914

Prime Minister of Portugal
- In office 11 April 1909 – 14 May 1909
- Monarch: Manuel II
- Preceded by: Artur de Campos Henriques
- Succeeded by: Venceslau de Lima

Minister of War of Portugal
- In office 18 August 1898 – 25 June 1900
- Monarch: Carlos I
- Prime Minister: José Luciano de Castro
- Preceded by: Francisco Maria da Cunha
- Succeeded by: Luís Augusto Pimentel Pinto
- In office 20 October 1904 – 27 Dececember 1905
- Monarch: Carlos I
- Prime Minister: José Luciano de Castro
- Preceded by: Luís Augusto Pimentel Pinto
- Succeeded by: José Matias Nunes
- In office 20 March – 19 May 1906
- Monarch: Carlos I
- Prime Minister: Ernesto Hintze Ribeiro
- Preceded by: José Matias Nunes
- Succeeded by: António Carlos Vasconcelos Porto
- In office 4 February 1908 – 14 May 1909
- Monarch: Manuel II
- Prime Minister: Francisco Ferreira do Amaral; Artur de Campos Henriques; Himself
- Preceded by: António Carlos Vasconcelos Porto
- Succeeded by: José Manuel de Elvas Cardeira

Personal details
- Born: 27 July 1847 Faro, Portugal
- Died: 7 June 1921 (aged 73) Lisbon, Portugal
- Party: Progressive Party (Portugal)

Military service
- Allegiance: (Kingdom of Portugal) Portugal
- Branch/service: Portuguese Army
- Years of service: 1863–1910
- Rank: General of division

Sebastião Custódio de Sousa Teles (Faro, 27 July 1847 – Lisbon, 7 June 1921), also known as Sebastião Teles, Sousa Teles, or in contemporary Portuguese as Sousa Telles, was a Portuguese politician and military officer. After a career in military logistics and education, he served multiple times as Minister of War, and briefly as President of the Council of Ministers (equivalent to prime minister) from 11 April to 14 May 1909 during the penultimate year of the Portuguese constitutional monarchy.

== Biography ==
=== Early life and military career ===
Sebastião Custódio de Sousa Teles was the son of colonel Casimiro Vítor de Sousa Teles de Morais (Lisbon, 23 May 1805 – ?)—whose maternal grandfather was French—and Antónia Fortunata de Brito e Abreu (Albufeira, 6 May 1808 – Lisbon, 29 July 1889). His brother Casimiro Vítor de Sousa Teles would also become a general. Portuguese sailor and writer Venceslau de Morais was his cousin.

Teles began his military career as a volunteer in the 17th Infantry Regiment of the Portuguese Army on 6 January 1863. He was promoted to ensign on 4 January 1871. On 20 September 1906 he was made general of his brigade, and on 26 December 1910 he was transferred to the reserves and made general of a division.

His military service took place mostly under the jurisdiction of the Portuguese Army's central organs in Lisbon. He specialized in military logistics and transportation, focusing his work on the region between the Douro and Tagus rivers, as well as the roads and railways of Estremadura Province. He also served in various administrative functions, including as secretary of the Comissão Superior de Guerra (High Commission of War), as director-general of the Serviço de Estado-Maior (General Staff Service), and as a member of the Comissão Consultiva de Defesa do Reino (Consultative Commission for the Defense of the Kingdom).

Teles was involved in military education and training, serving as commandant of the Escola do Exército (School of the Army; Portugal's then war college). He wrote various treatises on military organization and Portuguese national defense. One of his works, Introdução ao estudo dos conhecimentos militares ("Introduction to the study of military matters"), won the Lisbon Academy of Sciences' D. Luís I Prize. The work relates Auguste Comte's Positivist philosophy and the philosophies of Herbert Spencer and Émile Littré to military questions in Portugal. Portuguese intellectuals including Antero de Quental and Teófilo Braga—usually hostile to the military and military themes in academia—lauded the work. Braga even proposed admitting Teles as a member of the Lisbon Academy of Sciences.

=== Political career ===
Having dedicated most of his career to military education, Teles did not enter politics until 1898, when he accepted the position of Minister of War in the government led by José Luciano de Castro, leader of the Progressive Party. In his tenure as minister from 18 August 1898 to 25 June 1900, Teles spearheaded various improvements and reforms to the army's overall organization, culminating in the 13 July 1899 approval of the Lei de Reorganização do Exército (Law Reorganizing the Army).

On 17 March 1899 Sousa Teles became a Peer of the Realm, granting him a spot in the Chamber of Peers, the upper house of the Cortes Gerais (Portugal's pre-republican parliament). He focused his parliamentary career on topics related to the military, particularly reforms to promotions, uniforms, and recruitment, and the ultimately unsuccessful establishment of a "parliamentary committee of war" (comissão parlamentar de guerra).

Teles served as Minister of War twice more: between 20 October 1904 and 27 December 1905 as part of another José Luciano de Castro government, and between 4 February 1908 and 14 May 1909 under the successive governments led by Francisco Joaquim Ferreira do Amaral, Artur Alberto de Campos Henriques, and himself. His second and third tenures as minister took place in a time of increasing political instability following the assassination of King Carlos I of Portugal by republicans.

Teles's parliamentary career and multiple tenures as minister gained a him reputation for significant involvement in party politics generally and the Progressive Party specifically, despite the short duration of many governments during the Portuguese monarchy's twilight. He was a nominee for leader of the Progressive Party during the prolonged senescence of José Luciano de Castro. Portuguese historian Maria Filomena Mónica suggests Teles's relative permanence in government from 1908 through 1909 may be attributed to his desire to elbow out Francisco da Veiga Beirão as the Progressive Party leader, though Teles did not succeed in doing so.

Teles's brief 33-day service as President of the Council of Ministers (equivalent to prime minister) between 11 April and 14 May 1909—under which he also served as his own Minister of War—took place in an increasingly volatile political milieu. The short-lived administration resigned following the "Caeiro de Mata" incident, in which the young parliamentary deputy José Caeiro da Mata challenged former Minister of Finance Manuel Afonso de Espregueira to a duel. During a plenary session of the Cortes Gerais on 10 March 1909, Caeiro de Mata had accused Espregueira of fraud and other "criminal" activities for deciding to loan public money to the Companhia dos Caminhos de Ferro Portugueses, a railway company to which Espregueira was linked. Both participants left the duel unscathed. When Caiero de Mata returned to the Chamber of Deputies (the Cortes's lower house) on 25 April 1909 without apologizing for the duel and breach of decorum, many other deputies refused to carry out their parliamentary duties in protest. In response Caeiro de Mata fought another inconclusive duel: this time with parliamentary majority leader Manuel António Moreira Júnior, after which many deputies continued avoiding the Chamber of Deputies. Sousa Teles's government was forced to resign, further eroding the Portuguese monarchy's legitimacy.

The First Portuguese Republic was declared on 5 October 1910. Sousa Teles publicly declared his support for the Republic and decided to retire from politics. He died on 7 June 1921 in Lisbon.

== Honors ==
Teles received multiple military decorations for his academic works on military logistics and organization, including Knight, Commander, and Grand Officer of the Order of Aviz; Commander of the Military Order of Saint James of the Sword; Grand Cross of the Order of the Tower and Sword; Grand Cross of the Prussian Order of the Crown; and Grand Cross of Military Merit of Spain.

Political offices
Preceded by Campos Henriques	Prime Minister of Portugal (President of the Council of Ministers); 1909	Succeeded by Venceslau de Lima
