= 1840 in Portugal =

- Centuries: 17th; 18th; 19th; 20th; 21st
- Decades: 1820s; 1830s; 1840s; 1850s; 1860s
- See also: List of years in Portugal

Events in the year 1840 in Portugal.

== Incumbents ==
- Monarch: Mary II
- Prime Minister: José Travassos Valdez, 1st Count of Bonfim

== Births ==
- 8 July – Manuel de Arriaga, lawyer and politician (died 1917)

== Deaths ==
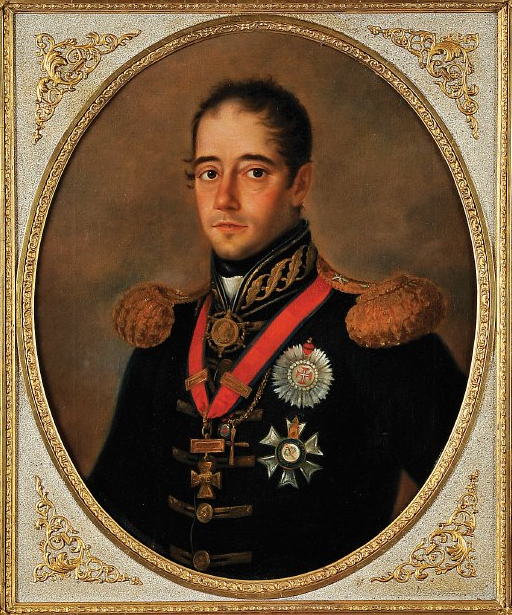
Luís do Rego Barreto

- 7 September — Luís do Rego Barreto, military and colonial administrator (b. 1777).
