= Anatólio Falé =

Portuguese musician, composer, and professor

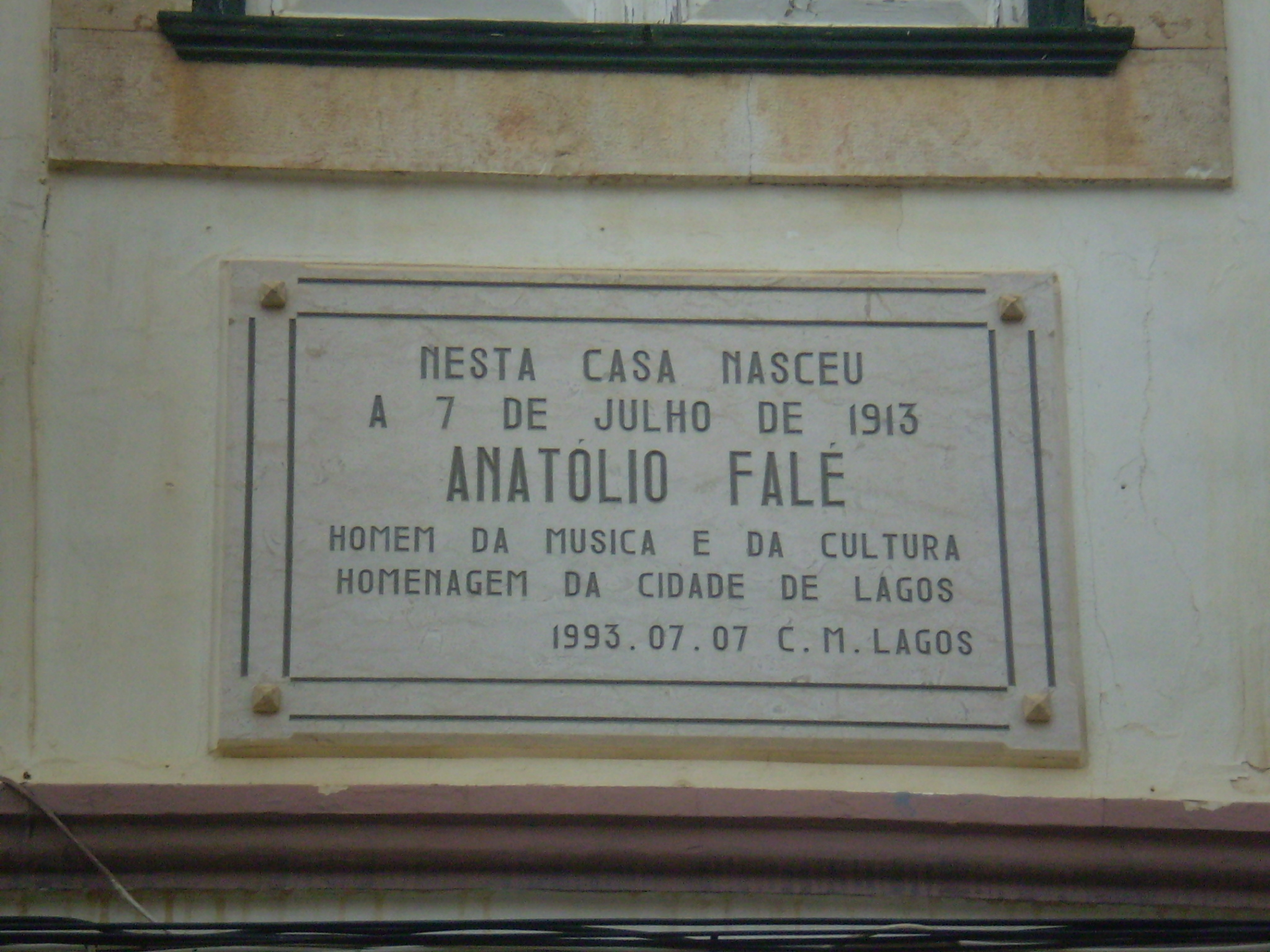

Anatólio Falé (1913–1980) was a Portuguese professor of music, musician and composer from Lagos. He is most associated with folk music. A road is named after him in his home town.

== See also ==
- List of Portuguese composers
