= Rafael Correia =

Portuguese footballer

Personal information
- Full name: Rafael António Correia
- Date of birth: 5 April 1915
- Place of birth: Almada, Portugal
- Date of death: 15 October 1958 (aged 43)
- Place of death: Trafaria, Portugal
- Position: Forward

Senior career*
Years	Team	Apps	(Gls)
1934–1946	Belenenses	239	(160)

International career
1934–1948	Portugal	6	
- * Club domestic league appearances and goals

Rafael António Correia (5 April 1915 – 15 October 1958), was a Portuguese footballer, who played as forward.

== International career ==
Correia gained 6 caps for the Portugal national team, and made his debut 6 November 1938 against Switzerland in Lausanne, in a 0-1 defeat.

== Death ==
After his retirement from football, he ran a bar in Trafaria, Portugal. Italian newspaper La Stampa reported on 17 October 1958 that Correia, probably to avenge some slanders about him, assaulted three men with a gun, killing one of them and seriously injuring the other two, and finally shot himself.
