= Manuel Marques (footballer) =

Portuguese footballer

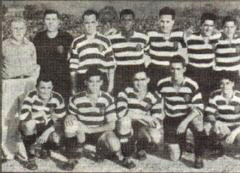

Personal information
- Full name: Manuel Soares Marques
- Date of birth: 8 August 1917
- Place of birth: Lisbon, Portugal
- Date of death: 10 December 1987 (aged 70)
- Position: Midfielder

Senior career*
Years	Team	Apps	(Gls)
1935–1951	Sporting CP	219	(4)

International career
1945	Portugal	2	(0)
- * Club domestic league appearances and goals

Manuel Soares Marques (8 August 1917 – 10 December 1987), former Portuguese footballer who played as midfielder.

== Football career ==
Marques gained 2 caps for Portugal and made his debut 13 March 1945 in Lisbon against Spain, in a 2–2 draw.
