= Viscount of Vilarinho de São Romão =

Viscount of Vilarinho de São Romão (Portuguese: Visconde de Vilarinaho de São Romão) is a title created by Queen Maria II of Portugal, by decree dated 17 September 1835, in favour of António Lobo Barbosa Teixeira Ferreira Girão (Sabrosa, Vilarinho de São Romão, 5 November 1785 - Lisbon, 17 March 1863], Member of the House of Lords, without descendants.

The Girão family is directly descended from Manuel Girão, son of a Spanish noble, António Girão (or Giron), belonging to the House of the Dukes of Osuna, who, in the early 16th century lived in Montemor-o-Velho, Portugal and who was also the father of Amador Girão (his eldest son), married D. Maria Freire de Andrade from the House of Corujeira, Vouzela (Portugal) from whom the Girão branch of Beira Alta (Portugal) follows.

== List of viscounts ==
1. António Lobo Barbosa Teixeira Ferreira Girão;
2. Alvaro Ferreira Teixeira Carneiro de Vasconcelos Girão, nephew of the first viscount, son of António Ferreira Carneiro de Vasconcelos and his wife D. Maria Aurélia Ferreira Girão (sister of the first Viscount). The second viscount was Lord of Avioso, Vilarinho de São Romão and Carregal in Portugal;
3. Luis António Ferreira Teixeira de Vasconcels Girão, civil engineer who only daughter D. Maria Júlia de Ancede Ferreira Girão, married Luis Lencastre Carneiro de Vasconcelos, 4th Baron of Lages in Porto (14 January 1905).
4. Francisco José Carneiro de Vasconcelos Girão;
5. Luis Manuel Ferreira Ferrão de Vasconcelos, born in Porto on (8 May 1951).
