= Francisco Castro (footballer, born 1910) =

Portuguese footballer

Personal information
- Full name: Francisco Pinto de Castro
- Date of birth: 1 April 1910
- Place of birth: Portugal
- Position: Forward

Senior career*
Years	Team	Apps	(Gls)
- FC Porto

International career
1930–1933	Portugal	2	(0)
- * Club domestic league appearances and goals

Francisco Pinto de Castro (born 1 April 1910 - unknown) was a Portuguese footballer who played as a forward for the Portugal national team.
