= Rita Lopes de Almeida =

Portuguese nun

Blessed Rita Lopes de Almeida JMJ
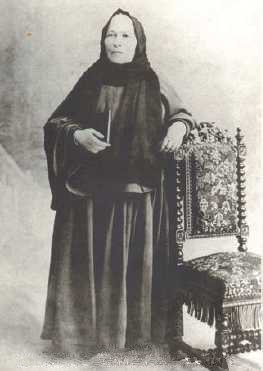

Virgin
- Born: 5 March 1848; Casalmedinho, Ribafeita, Viseu, Portugal
- Died: 6 January 1913 (aged 64); Casalmedinho, Ribafeita
- Venerated in: Roman Catholic Church
- Beatified: 28 May 2006, Viseu, Portugal by Cardinal José Saraiva Martins
- Feast: 6 January
- Patronage: Sisters of Jesus, Mary and Joseph

Rita Lopes de Almeida (religious name Rita Amada de Jesus, 5 March 1848 – 6 January 1913), was a Portuguese religious sister and the founder of the Sisters of Jesus, Mary and Joseph. She was called "Apostle of the Rosary, Apostle of the Eucharist, [and] Apostle of the Family" and one of the greatest Christian teachers of her time. She worked with the poor and founded schools for the children of single mothers, despite the religious persecution in Portugal at the time. Almeida was beatified by Pope Benedict XVI in 2006. As of 2020, the Sisters of Mary, Jesus and Joseph were in nine countries, including in Brazil, which celebrated the 100th anniversary of its founding there in 2012.

== Life ==
Rita Lopes de Almeida was born on 5 March 1848 in Ribafeita, Portugal, the fourth of seven children, to Manuel Lopez and Josefa de Jesus Almeida. Her family was devout Catholics and "felt a great desire to live an authentic Christian life". Almeida demonstrated a devotion to the Eucharist, the Virgin Mary, Saint Joseph, and "a great love for the Pope". Almeida, despite the religious persecution of the time and death threats against her, traveled to parishes throughout Portugal, teaching parishioners how to pray the Rosary.

At a young age, while still living with her parents, Almeida visited the Benedictine sisters in Viseu, 15 kilometers from her home parish, but was unable to join the order because the government had forbidden all religious houses to admit new members. The Benedictine sisters taught Almeida the religious practice of mortification. She felt called to be a missionary and an apostle, despite the laws that prohibited it in Portugal. She also rejected her suitors because of that call, even though they were wealthy. Her family was involved in her missionary work; needy women lived in the family home. She travelled from parish to parish to encourage people to make their faith an important part of their lives. Her missionary call was "to free the youth from religious indifferentism and immorality, through the family apostolate".

When Almeida was 29 years old, despite her parents' objections, she was admitted into the Sisters of Charity, a non-Portuguese order in Porto, because all local orders had been expelled from Portugal. She left the Sisters of Charity shortly afterwards because "she was disappointed with [their] spirit and charism" and with the support of her spiritual director, accepted economic help from a noble family and established a school for children of single mothers. In 1889, Almeida founded the Sisters of Jesus, Mary, and Joseph, which was based upon "the spirituality of the Holy Family of Nazareth". She also founded a poor children's school in her own parish and later expanded her work to other dioceses in Portugal, founding schools in Castelo Branco, Porto, and Guarda.

In 1910, the Portuguese government seized control of all Church property and foreign religious orders left the country, so Almeida had to close her homes and the sisters dispersed and she hid with her fellow sisters and students, disguising themselves as gypsies, in her parents' home for three years. In 1912, she sent small groups of sisters to Brazil to educate poor children; their first school was founded in Igarapava. In 2012, the order celebrated the 100th anniversary of its presence in Brazil. The sisters returned to Portugal 32 years later. As of 2020, the Sisters of Jesus, Mary and Joseph exists in nine countries.

Almeida died on 6 January 1913.

== Beatification and legacy ==
The process of Almeida's canonization began in 1991 by Margarida Maria Rossi, the Superior General of the Sisters of Jesus, Mary and Joseph. The miracle that satisfied the requirement toward beatification was the healing of a Brazilian woman after Almeida was invoked by her and her daughter, a sister of the order. She was beatified by Pope Benedict XVI on 28 May 2006, in Viseu. The homily during the ceremony commemorating it was given by Jose Saraiva Martins. Martins stated, about Almeida, that she was an expression of "the life, culture, diligence and religiosity of the Portuguese". Martin also said that Almeida "is remembered from Portugal to Brazil, from Bolivia to Paraguay, from Angola to Mozambique, and her memory links Portugal to the American and African Continents" and that despite receiving death threats, she aimed to restore the dignity of women and their families. Martin called Almeida one of the greatest Christian teachers of her time.

Almeida stated, about her own call, "What I always wanted was to do the will of Our Lord God" and "I felt such fervour that I would have been capable of going round the world for the conversion of a single soul". The Vatican's documentation of Almeida's beatification in 2006 stated that she "had a great desire to save many souls". The document also states that her "spiritual life was characterized by eucharistic reparation and devotion to the Sacred Heart of Jesus". In 2006, Pope Benedict XVI called Almeida "Apostle of the Rosary, Apostle of the Eucharist, [and] Apostle of the Family."

In 2010, the Sisters of Jesus, Mary and Joseph sent relics of Almeida, to celebrate the 100th anniversary of the order's founding in Brazil, to their communities around the world.
