= Venceslau de Lima =

Portuguese geologist, paleontologist, viticulturist, and politician (1858–1919)

Venceslau de Sousa Pereira de Lima
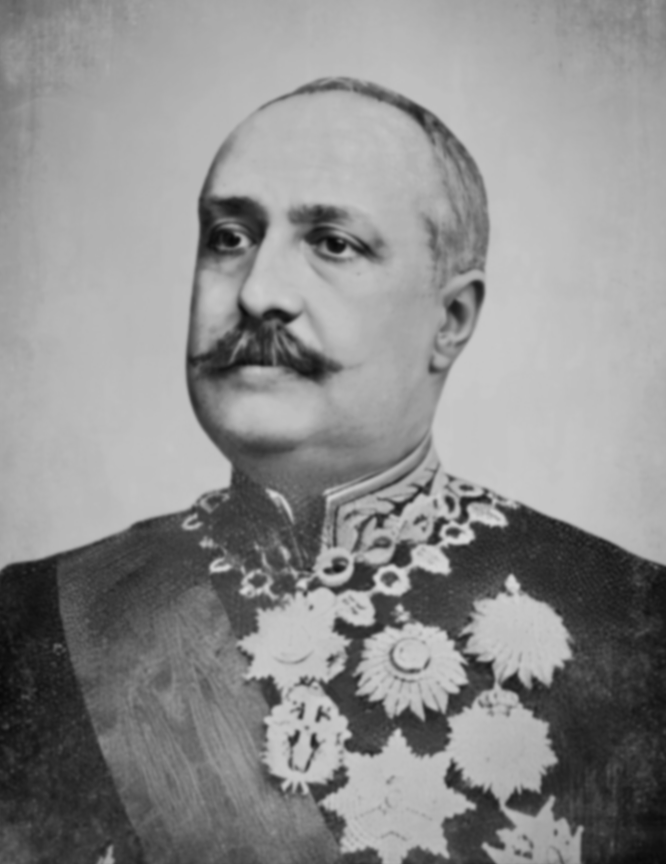
- Official portrait as a peer of the realm, 1901

Prime Minister of Portugal
- In office 14 May 1909 – 22 December 1909
- Monarch: Manuel II
- Preceded by: Sebastião Teles
- Succeeded by: Francisco da Veiga Beirão

Personal details
- Born: 15 November 1858 Porto, Portugal
- Died: 24 December 1919 (aged 61) Lisbon, Portugal
- Party: Regenerator Party

Venceslau de Sousa Pereira de Lima, ComTe, GCTE, ComSE, GCSE, ComC, GCC, ComNSC, GCNSC (15 November 1858 in Porto – 24 December 1919 in Lisbon), also known as Venceslau de Lima and anglicized as Wenceslau de Sousa Pereira de Lima or Wenceslau de Lima, was a Portuguese geologist, paleontologist, viticulturist, and politician who, among other functions, served as a member of Parliament, a minister, and as President of the Council of Ministers (now Prime Minister). He was a member of the Sciences Academy of Lisbon.

== Biography ==

Born into a wealthy family from Porto, Venceslau Pereira de Lima was sent abroad very young, and there made his preparatory and secondary studies. After completing these studies he returned to Portugal with professional training focused on the natural sciences, quite distinct from the course of study then propitiated by Portuguese schools. He enrolled at the Faculty of Philosophy at the University of Coimbra, completing the course with high honors. This required a licensure examination in which he defended his thesis on coal plants. Soon afterwards, on 26 November 1882, he received his doctorate from the same university.

In 1883 he competed for a position on the faculty of the Polytechnic Academy of Porto, having publicly presented during the competition a dissertation on the function of chlorophyll as evidence of his ability. He was ultimately nominated for the position, initiating a career that would last for nearly thirty years. During that time he chaired the institution's geology department, with a few hiatuses due to his political activity. In parallel with his academic career, he carried out a set of pioneering experiments in the field of plant paleontology.

At the time, paleontology was a nascent science and the study of fossils discovered in Portuguese territory was in its early stages, with most paleontological researchers in Portugal being foreigners. The only published works by Portuguese researchers consisted of Bernardino António Gomes's studies of Carboniferous plant fossils.

Venceslau de Lima decided to bring together the previously published works of foreign researchers, especially those of Daniel Sharpe, Charles Bunbury, and Oswald Heer, and from that incipient base developed a study of geology and plant paleontology in Portugal, specifically of Carboniferous land.

In 1886, he was nominated as the engineer of the Geological Works Section (Secção dos Trabalhos Geológicos) of Portugal and was charged with the study of plant fossils in Portugal. In this position he collaborated with Carlos Ribeiro, a pioneer in Portuguese geology.

In 1908 he became the President of the Geological Survey Commission (Comissão dos Serviços Geológicos) of Portugal, when its previous president, General Joaquim Filipe Nery da Encarnação Delgado, died.

Because of his scientific work, he was nominated for membership in the Sciences Academy of Lisbon and the Institute of Coimbra (Instituto da Coimbra).

Venceslau de Lima did not limit himself to academic and scientific pursuits; soon after taking his first teaching position he became a member of the Regenerator Party, and in the name of the party was at one time or another civil governor (prefect) of Vila Real, Coimbra, and Porto. He was also elected to represent northern Portugal in the Assembly of the Republic for various terms. On 17 March 1901 he was made a Peer of the Portuguese Realm. His involvement in the Royal Courts focused on issues related to public education; he advocated for the reform of Portugal's Higher Council for Public Instruction (Conselho Superior de Instrução Pública), of which he was a member.

When Ernesto Hintze Ribeiro became President of the Council of Ministers (now Prime Minister) in 1903, he asked Venceslau de Lima to assume the post of Minister for Foreign Affairs, which he did. During his tenure there were marked improvements in Portugal's relations with the United Kingdom and a commercial treaty was signed with Germany. Lima continued in the office into 1905, despite the fact José Luciano de Castro had replaced Hintze Ribero as President of the Council of Ministers.

In 1909, during the death throes of the Portuguese constitutional monarchy, Venceslau de Lima was asked to lead one of the last regimes of the constitutional monarchy, serving as President of the Council of Ministers from 14 May to 22 December 1909, and during the same time was also Minister for the Kingdom (Ministro do Reino).

During his long political career, he was also a member of the Council of the State (Conselho do Estado), Mayor of Porto, and director of the Medical-Surgical School of Porto (Escola Médico-Cirúrgica do Porto). He was also vice-president of the executive commission of the National Institute for Assistance to Consumptives (Instituto de Assistência Nacional aos Tuberculosos) and a member of the Porto Employers Commission (Patronato Portuense).

Venceslau de Lima was also a viticulturist, introducing on his properties various technical improvements that were new to Portuguese viticulture. He was president of the Anti-Phylloxera Commission of the North and helped develop technical solutions to the parasite's destruction of vineyards.

When the Portuguese Republic was founded in 1910, he refused, as a monarchist, to work for the government, choosing instead to resign any and all public posts he held. Having moved away from politics in the last years of his life, he focused once again on scientific research. He was preparing a study on Portuguese coal lands when he died.

== Decorations ==
Venceslau de Lima was a Commander and Grand Cross of the Order of the Tower and Sword, the Order of Saint James of the Sword, the Order of Christ, and the Order of the Immaculate Conception of Vila Viçosa. He also received various foreign decorations, including the Legion of Honour of France, the Order of Charles III and the Order of Isabella the Catholic of Spain, the Order of Saints Maurice and Lazarus of Italy, the Royal Victorian Order of the United Kingdom of Great Britain and Ireland, and the Order of Leopold of Belgium.

== Published works ==
Over a thirty-year period Venceslau de Lima published a wide range of works on paleontology and the geology of coal deposits, including:

- Notícia sôbre os vegetais fósseis da flora neocomiana do solo português (Notice on the plant fossils of the flora neocomiana of Portuguese soil)
- Monografia do gênero Dicranophillum (Sistema Carbónico) (Monograph of the genus Dicranophillum [Carboniferous System])
- Notice sur une algue palèozoique (Notice on a Paleozoic algae)
- Notícia sôbre as camadas da série permo-carbónica do Bussaco (Notice on the layers of the Permo-Carboniferous series of Bussaco)
- Note sur une nouvel Eurypterus rotliegendes (Notice on a novel Eurypterus rotliegendes)

Political offices
Preceded by Sousa Teles	Prime Minister of Portugal; 1909	Succeeded by Francisco da Veiga Beirão
