= Numídico Bessone =

Portuguese sculptor (1913–1985)

Numídico Bessone (1913–1985) was a Portuguese sculptor.

Bessone was born on São Miguel Island in the Azores. He studied at the Superior School of Fine Arts in Lisbon, with further studies in Italy with Guido Galori and Michele Guerrisi. In 1963 his marble statue "The Spirit of the Immigrant" was installed at Root Park in San Leandro, California. In 1965 he was commissioned to create a bronze bust of Juan Rodríguez Cabrillo for Cabrillo College.
