= Manuel Afonso =

Portuguese football manager

Manuel da Luz Afonso (Loulé, 31 January 1917 – 15 October 2000) was a Portuguese football manager.

He was the head of the football department of Benfica, during their 1960s Golden Era, until 1964 when he was called to work for the Portugal national football team as seleccionador ("the selector"), with Otto Glória as the coach. That meant that Afonso would be choosing the players but would not be the coach in charge of the squad.

They took over on 15 November 1964, with a 2–1 win over Spain, in a friendly match. It was a promising start to the successful campaign Portugal had in the lead up to the 1966 FIFA World Cup finals, in England. Portugal qualified for the first time, eliminating the world vice-champions Czechoslovakia. Portugal went on to reach the third place at the World Cup finals.

Manuel da Luz Afonso left the National Team following the 1–2 loss to Sweden, on 13 November 1966, in a European Championship qualifier. He left the Portugal national squad after 20 matches, with 15 wins, 2 ties and 3 defeats, still the best record ever for his country.
