= António Teixeira de Sousa =

Portuguese medical doctor and politician

Count António Teixeira de Sousa
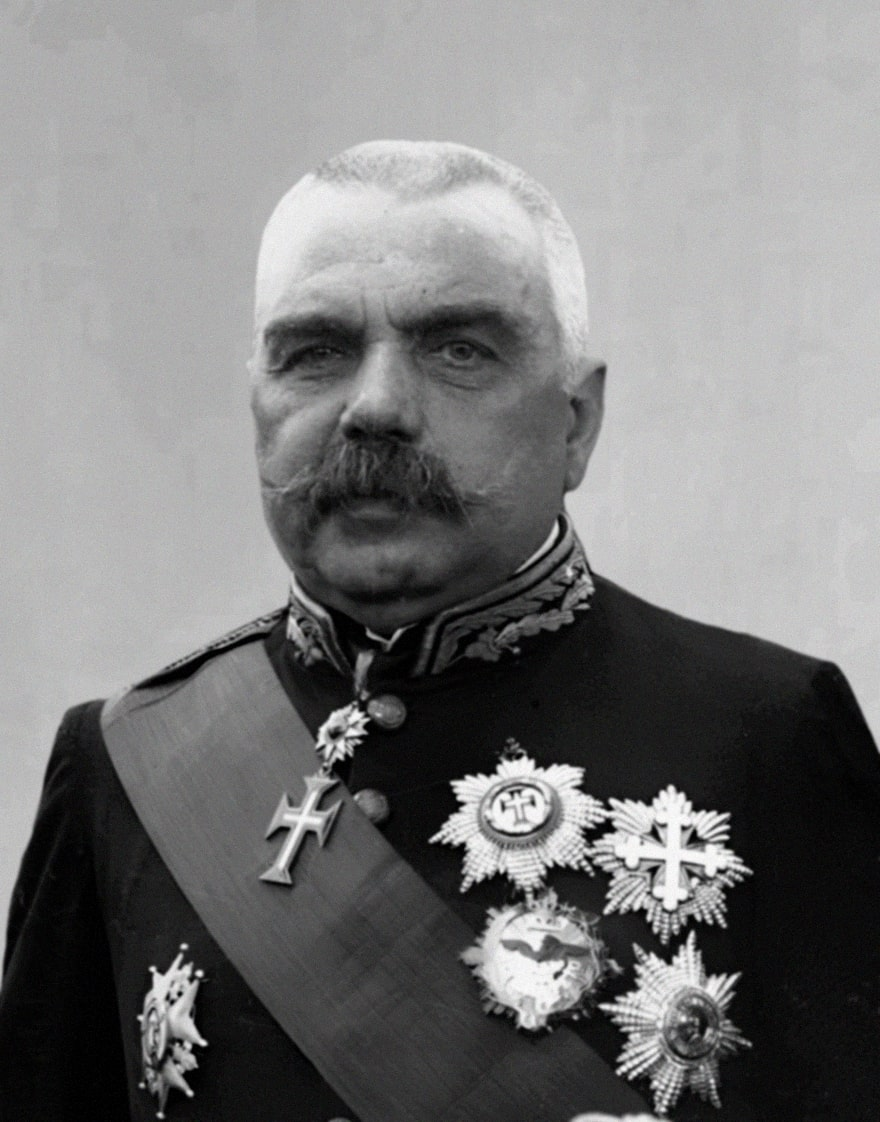

Prime Minister of Portugal
- In office 26 June 1910 – 5 October 1910
- Monarch: Manuel II
- Preceded by: Francisco da Veiga Beirão
- Succeeded by: Provisional Government

Personal details
- Born: 5 May 1857 Celeirós, Sabrosa, Kingdom of Portugal
- Died: 5 June 1917 (aged 60) Celeirós, Sabrosa, Portuguese Republic
- Party: Regenerator Party
- Occupation: Medical doctor Thermae doctor Writer

António Teixeira de Sousa, 2nd Count of Sousa Palmela (European Portuguese pronunciation: [ɐ̃ˈtɔni.u tɐjˈʃɐjɾɐ ðɨ ˈsozɐ, ɐ̃ˈtɔnju -]; 5 May 1857 – 5 June 1917) was a Portuguese medical doctor and politician during the Constitutional Monarchy.

== Biography ==
He graduated in Medicine at the University of Porto in 1883.

A member of the conservative Regenerator Party, he was first elected to the Chamber of Deputies in 1889. He was later minister of the Navy and Overseas (1900–1903), and, twice, of Finance (1903–1904, 1906). He became President of the Council of Ministers (Prime Minister) on 26 June 1910, and would be the last Prime Minister of the Constitutional Monarchy as King D. Manuel II was overthrown by a republican revolution on 5 October 1910. He left politics after the republic proclamation, but showed moderate support for the new regime. He died on 5 June 1917.

Political offices
| Preceded by Francisco da Veiga Beirão | Prime Minister of Portugal; 1910 | Succeeded by Provisional Government |
