= Artur de Campos Henriques =

Portuguese politician

Artur Alberto de Campos Henriques
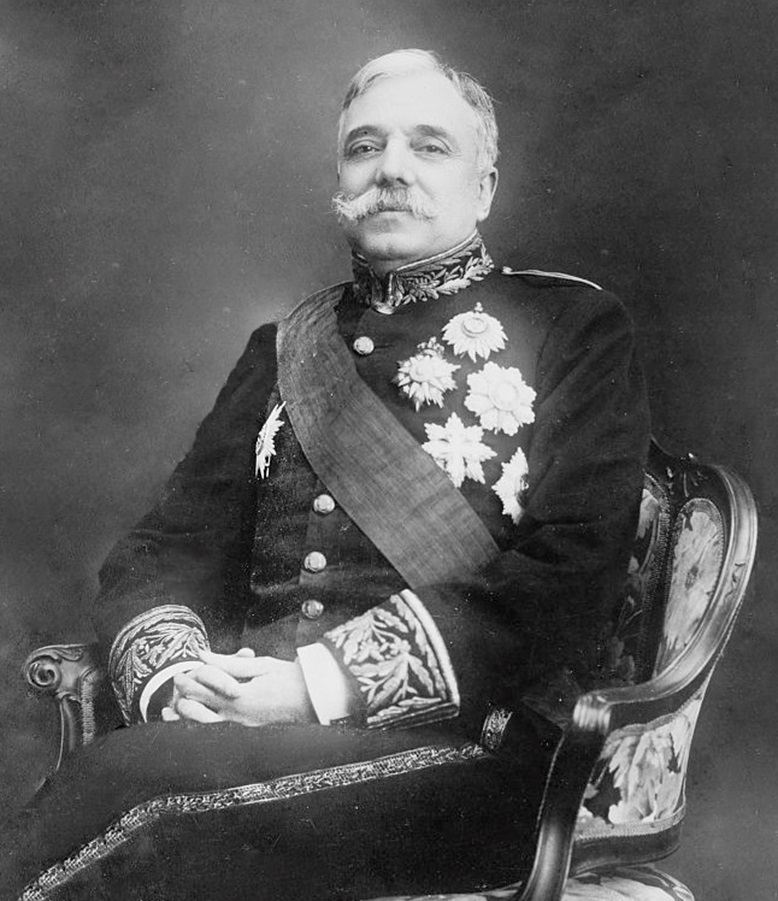
- Official portrait as minister of justice, 1906-1908

Prime Minister of Portugal
- In office 26 December 1908 – 11 April 1909
- Monarch: Manuel II
- Preceded by: Francisco Joaquim Ferreira do Amaral
- Succeeded by: Sebastião Custódio de Sousa Teles

Personal details
- Born: 28 April 1853 Porto, Portugal
- Died: 7 November 1922 (aged 69) Lisbon, Portugal
- Party: Independent

Artur Alberto de Campos Henriques, GCTE GCC (Porto, 28 April 1853 – Lisbon, 7 November 1922) was a Portuguese politician who once served as Prime Minister of Portugal.

== Biography ==
Campos Henriques was of Jewish ancestry. His brother was the first Viscount of Vila Nova da Foz Côa and his maternal uncle was the second Viscount of Lagoaça, Júlio César de Castro Pereira. He served as a member of Parliament, and was the prefect (Governador Civil) of Porto from 1891 to 1894 (interim 1891 to 1893). He became Minister for Public Works in 1894. From 26 December 1908 to 11 April 1909, he served as the President of the Council of Ministers (today Prime Minister) in a nonpartisan administration created on the initiative of King Manuel II.

Campos Henriques was close to the conservative wing of the Regenerator Party, but was ultimately without formal party affiliation. From 25 June 1900 to 20 October 1904 and from 20 March to 19 May 1906 he served as Minister for Justice during the second and third administrations of Ernesto Hintze Ribeiro.

He served once again as Minister for Justice in the Francisco Joaquim Ferreira do Amaral administration, from 4 February to 25 December 1908, after which he became President of the Council of Ministers, on Ferreira do Amaral's loss of parliamentary support.

Campos Henriques was awarded the Grand Cross of the Order of the Tower and Sword.

Political offices
Preceded by Ferreira do Amaral	Prime Minister of Portugal (President of the Council of Ministers); 1908–1909	Succeeded by Sousa Teles
