= Francisco da Veiga Beirão =

Portuguese politician

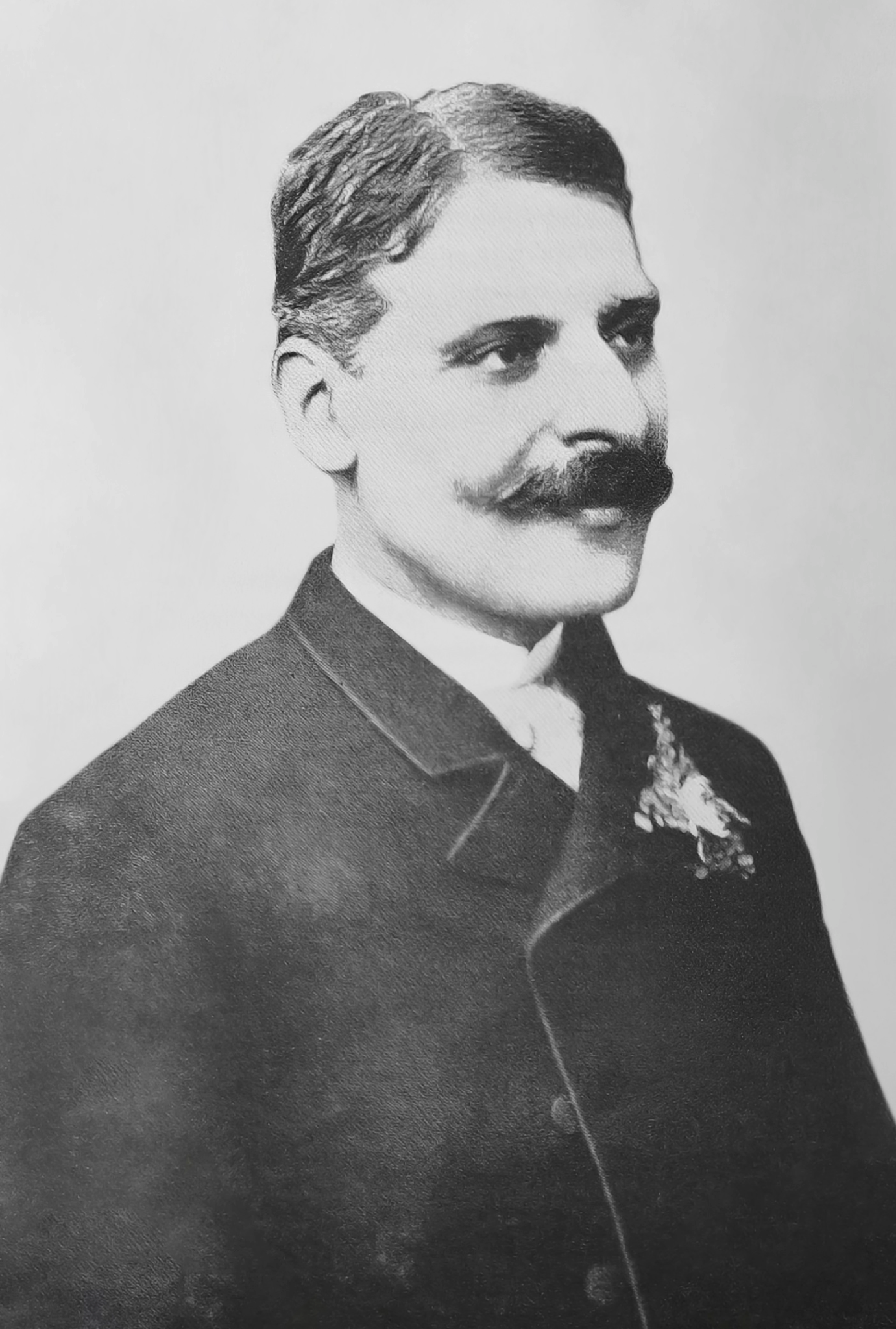
- Official portrait, 1909

Prime Minister of Portugal
- In office 22 December 1909 – 26 June 1910
- Monarch: Manuel II
- Preceded by: Venceslau de Lima
- Succeeded by: António Teixeira de Sousa

Personal details
- Born: 24 July 1841 Lisbon, Portugal
- Died: 11 November 1916 (aged 75) Paço de Arcos, Portugal
- Party: Progressive Party

Francisco António da Veiga Beirão (24 July 1841, in Lisbon – 11 November 1916, in Paço de Arcos), commonly known as Francisco da Veiga Beirão (Portuguese pronunciation: [fɾɐ̃ˈsiʃku ðɐ ˈvɐjɣɐ βɐjˈɾɐ̃w]), or Veiga Beirão, was a Portuguese politician of the late period of the Constitutional Monarchy. He served as President of the Ministry (Prime Minister), being the second last before the 5 October republican coup d'état that established the Portuguese First Republic. He was a professor at the Industrial Institute and president of Lawyers Association of Lisbon. He was also a member of the Royal Academy of Sciences and of the Institut de Droit International and the Real Academía de Jurisprudencia y Legislación de Madrid. He had a law degree, from the University of Coimbra.

He started his political life in the Reformist Party and was a deputy in the Cortes from 1880 to 1904. However he maintained a certain distance from party-politics. He also served as Minister of Justice (29 February 1886 – 14 January 1890) and of Foreign Affairs (1898). He was the author of the regulating code for the creation and functioning of commercial societies in Portugal (1888).

On 22 December 1909 he was named President of the Ministry (Prime Minister) by young king Manuel II of Portugal. However, his government did not last long as it was followed by a political scandal related to the Crédito Predial Bank that implicated several of his ministers. He resigned on 26 June 1910. He was followed by António Teixeira de Sousa, the last Prime Minister of the constitutional monarchy.

After the proclamation of the Portuguese Republic on 5 October 1910 he abandoned political life and continued working as a lawyer and attorney.

== See also ==
- History of Portugal
  - History of Portugal (1834-1910)
  - History of Portugal (1910-1926)
- Timeline of Portuguese history
- Politics of Portugal
  - List of prime ministers of Portugal
  - Prime Minister of Portugal

Political offices
Preceded by Venceslau de Sousa Pereira de Lima	Prime Minister of Portugal; 1909–1910	Succeeded by António Teixeira de Sousa
