= Manuel II of Portugal =

King of Portugal from 1908 to 1910

Manuel II
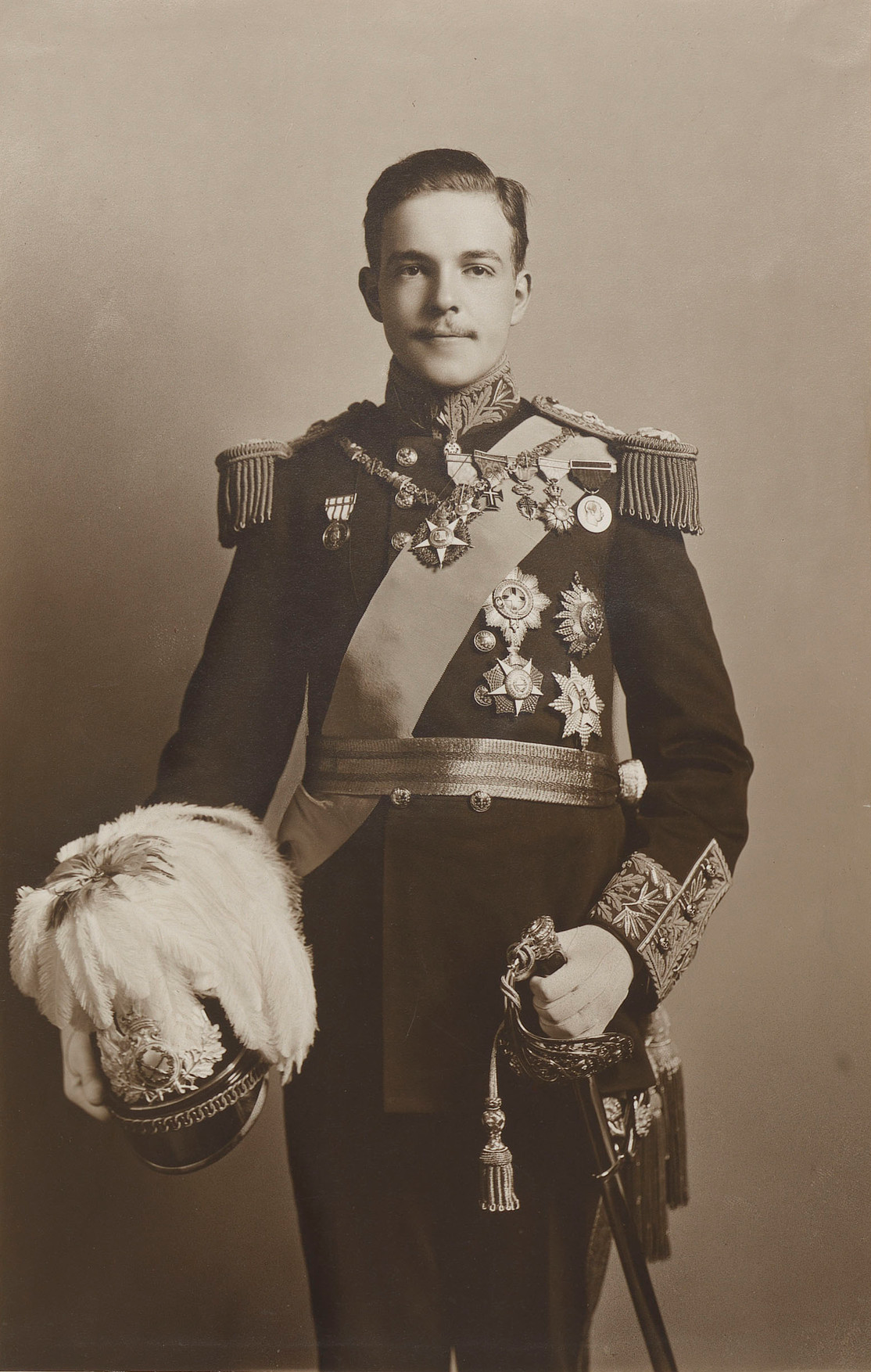
- Formal portrait, 1909

King of Portugal
- Reign: 1 February 1908 – 5 October 1910
- Acclamation: 6 May 1908
- Predecessor: Carlos I
- Successor: Monarchy abolished (Teófilo Braga as President of the Provisional Government)
- Prime Ministers: See list: João Franco Francisco Ferreira do Amaral Artur Campos Henriques Sebastião Sousa Teles Venceslau de Lima Francisco Veiga Beirão António Teixeira de Sousa
- Born: 15 November 1889; Belém Palace, Lisbon, Portugal
- Died: 2 July 1932 (aged 42); Fulwell, Middlesex, England
- Burial: 2 August 1932; Pantheon of the Braganzas
- Spouse: Augusta Victoria of Hohenzollern (m. 1913)
Names
- Manuel Maria Filipe Carlos Amélio Luís Miguel Rafael Gabriel Gonzaga Francisco de Assis Eugénio de Saxe-Coburgo-Gotha e Bragança
- House: Braganza (Note: "While remaining patrilineal dynasts of the duchy of Saxe-Coburg and Gotha according to pp. 88, 116 of the 1944 Almanach de Gotha, Title 1, Chapter 1, Article 5 of the 1838 Portuguese constitution declared, with respect to Ferdinand II of Portugal's issue by his first wife, that 'the Most Serene House of Braganza is the reigning house of Portugal and continues through the Person of the Lady Queen Maria II'. Thus their mutual descendants constitute the Coburg line of the House of Braganza".)
- Father: Carlos I of Portugal
- Mother: Amélie of Orléans

Dom Manuel II (Note: Also rendered as Manoel in Contemporary Portuguese. His full name was Manuel Maria Filipe Carlos Amélio Luís Miguel Rafael Gabriel Gonzaga Francisco de Assis Eugénio de Saxe-Coburgo-Gotha e Bragança.) (15 November 1889 – 2 July 1932), sometimes known as the Unfortunate (o Desaventurado) or the Patriot (o Patriota), was the last king of Portugal, reigning from 1908 until 1910.

Manuel was born in the Palace of Belém, Lisbon, during the reign of his father, Carlos I. He was his third and youngest child. Before ascending the throne, he held the title of Duke of Beja. He received a traditional education. Manuel entered the naval school in 1907. He was never expected to be king, since it was expected that his elder brother would assume that role.

After the regicide in 1908, which killed the King and the Prince Royal, Manuel, then 18 years old, became king. He reigned as constitutional monarch through an extremely volatile political climate which culminated with the end of nearly 800 years of monarchy in 1910. As king, he believed that it was his father's direct involvement in political affairs that caused his death, so he limited the use of his powers in influencing the government; however, he was very active in solving what would become to be known as the Social Question. Manuel also ended some traditions, like the traditional hand-kissing ceremony.

During a period of unsustainable political instability the monarchy was overthrown in 1910, which converted Portugal into a republic. Manuel and his family subsequently fled to exile in the UK. During exile in 1913, he married Augusta Victoria of Hohenzollern. He created a considerable library by buying Portuguese books in auction houses. Manuel died in 1932 aged 42 at Twickenham, Middlesex.

== Early life ==
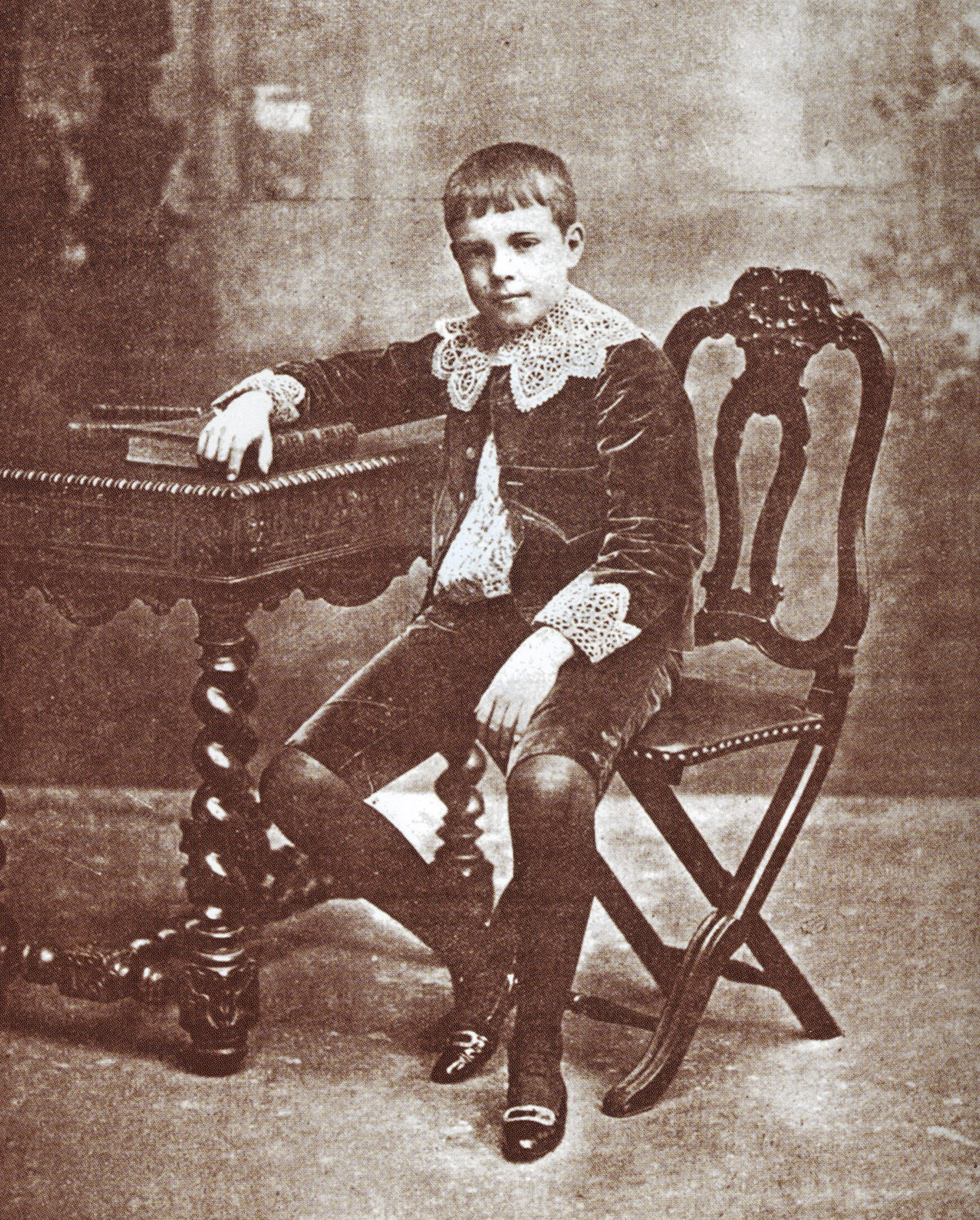
Infante D. Manuel, Duke of Beja, c. 1901, around age 12

Manuel was born in the Palace of Belém, Lisbon, less than a month after his father King Carlos I ascended the Portuguese throne. He was the third child (Note: The second child was Maria Ana, who died shortly after her birth.) and second son of Carlos and Amélie of Orléans.

A member of the House of Braganza, he was baptised a few days later, with his maternal grandfather as godfather. Pedro II, former Emperor of Brazil and Manuel II's paternal great-granduncle, who had been deposed from the Brazilian throne on the day of Manuel's birth, attended the ceremony.

He received the traditional education of a member of the royal family, without the political preoccupations that befell his older brother, who was destined to become King. Although Manuel was raised as a member of the upper class he took a more populist tone after ascending to the throne, and abandoned many of the court protocols. (Note: In the annual Beija-mão Real ("Kiss the Royal Hand") ceremony, on 1 January, he declined to have the attending dignitaries kiss his hand.) He studied history and languages, learning English and French from an early age. He demonstrated a love of literature and reading, unlike his older brother who was more interested in physical activities. Manuel's upbringing included horse riding, fencing, rowing, tennis and gardening. He was a great lover of music, especially Beethoven and Wagner, and played the piano.

As a child, Manuel played with the children of Count of Figueiró, Count of Galveias and with other families of the Court. In 1902, he was taught Latin and German by Franz Kerausch, later instruction was by Father João Damasceno Fiadeiro (Portuguese history); Marquês Leitão (Mathematics); M. Boeyé (French and French literature); Alfredo King (English and English literature), Father Domingos Fructuoso (Religion and Morals) and Alexandre Rey Colaço (piano).

In 1903, Manuel travelled with his mother and his brother to Egypt, on board the royal yacht Amélia. According to R. Benton, the trip "may have been decisive in Manuel's decision to enter the Portuguese navy and make it a career." In the summer of 1904, the prince became a cadet in the Portuguese Navy. He began his training in the Escola Naval in 1907.

== Lisbon regicide ==
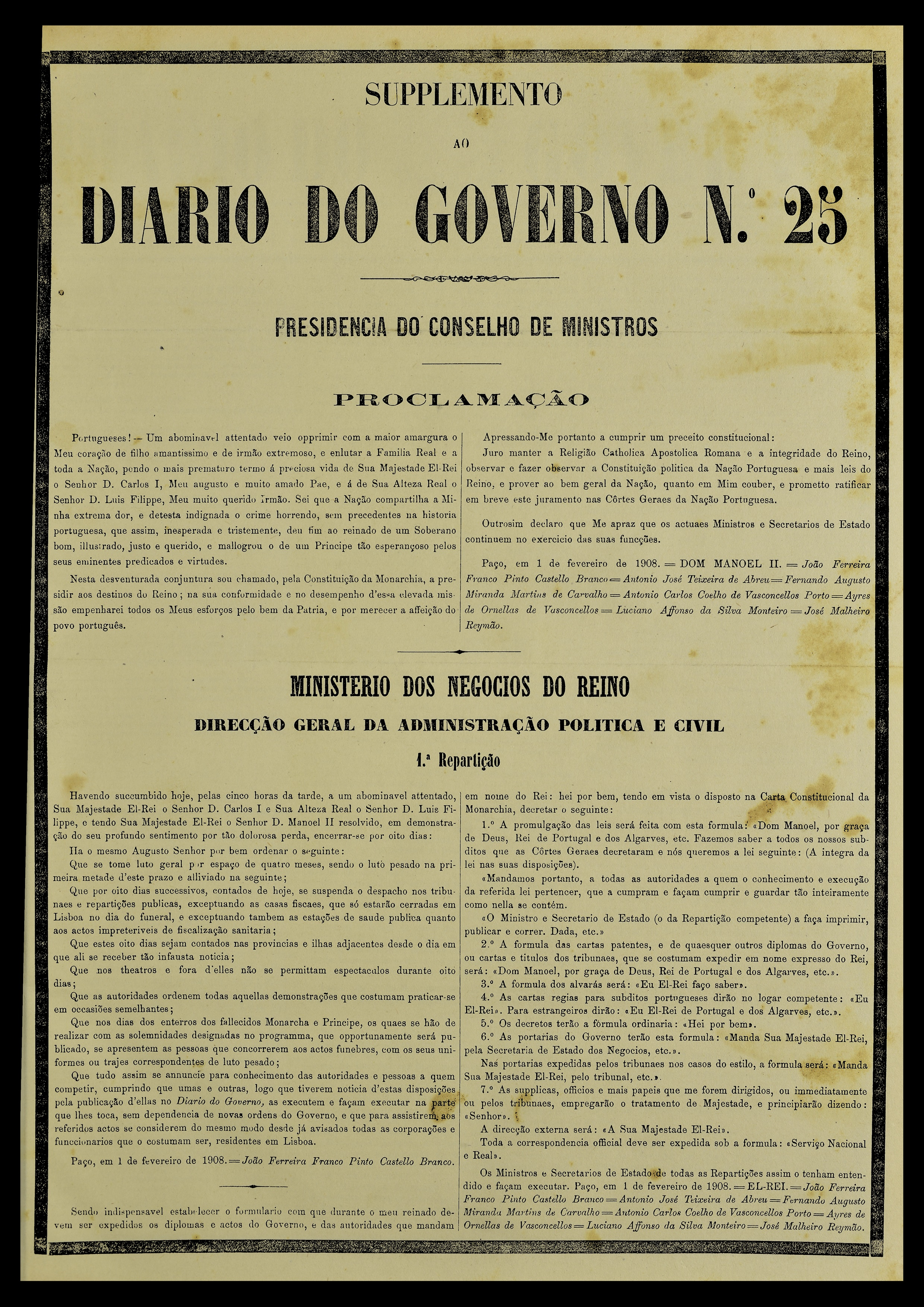
Proclamation of the accession of Manuel as king of Portugal issued on February 1, 1908, following the Lisbon regicide.

Manuel's future in the Portuguese Navy was abruptly shelved on 1 February 1908. On that day, the royal family returned from the Ducal Palace in Vila Viçosa to Lisbon. On their way to the royal palace, the carriage carrying King Carlos and his family passed through the Terreiro do Paço plaza where shots were fired by at least two Portuguese republican activist revolutionaries: Alfredo Luis da Costa and Manuel Buiça. It is unclear whether the assassins were attempting to kill the King, the Prince Royal or the prime minister, João Franco. The murderers were shot dead on the spot by the royal bodyguard. The King was killed; Prince Luís Filipe was mortally wounded; Prince Manuel was hit in the arm; Queen Amélie was unharmed. It was Amélie's quick thinking that saved her younger son. About 20 minutes later, Prince Luis Filipe died. Days later, Manuel II was proclaimed King of Portugal. The young King, who had not been groomed to rule, sought to save the fragile position of the Braganza dynasty by dismissing João Franco and his entire cabinet in 1908. The ambitions of various political parties made Manuel's short reign a turbulent one. In free elections held on 28 August 1910, the republicans won only 14 seats in the legislature.

== Reign ==
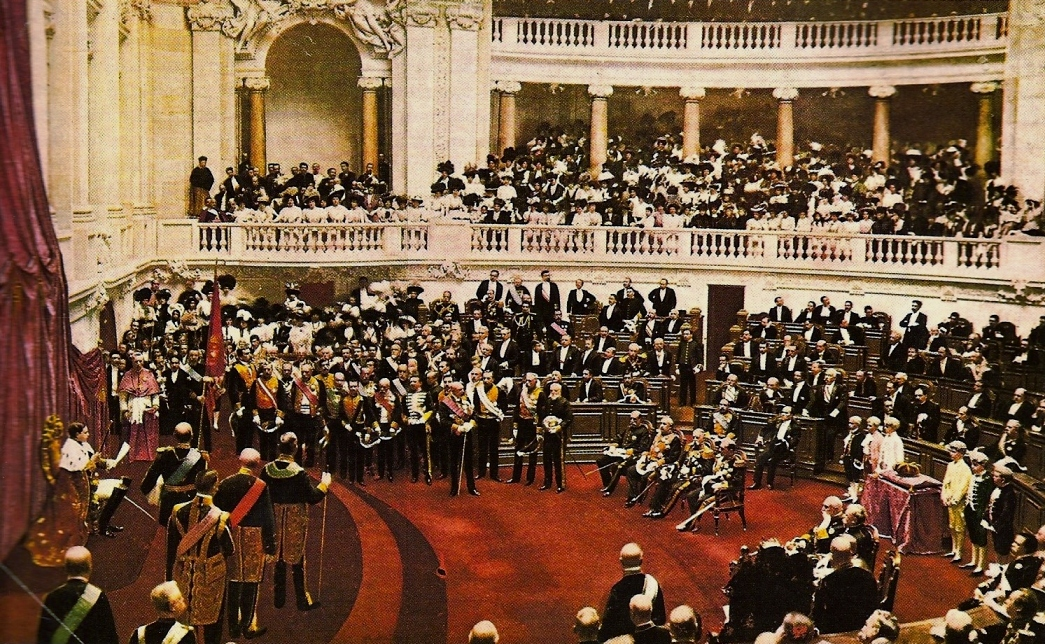
Acclamation ceremony of King Manuel II, at the Palace of the Cortes in 1908.

His first act was to meet with his Council of State and request the resignation of João Franco, whose policies may have been responsible for the tragedy. He appointed a government of national unity, presided over by Admiral Francisco Joaquim Ferreira do Amaral. This quieted the republicans, but in retrospect was seen as weakness.

He opened the Royal Court Assembly on 6 May 1908 in the presence of national representatives, and affirmed his support of the Constitution. The King received general public sympathy, due to the deaths of his father and older brother. He was protected by his mother, Amélie, and sought out the support of the experienced politician José Luciano de Castro. Judging that the intervention of King Carlos was a reason for the events of 1908, he declared that he would reign, but not govern. (Note: Both Manuel and his mother were convinced that King Carlos had compromised himself by intervening openly in politics. With this in mind, Manuel preferred to keep aside, and tried not to be compromised with the leaders of the parties.)

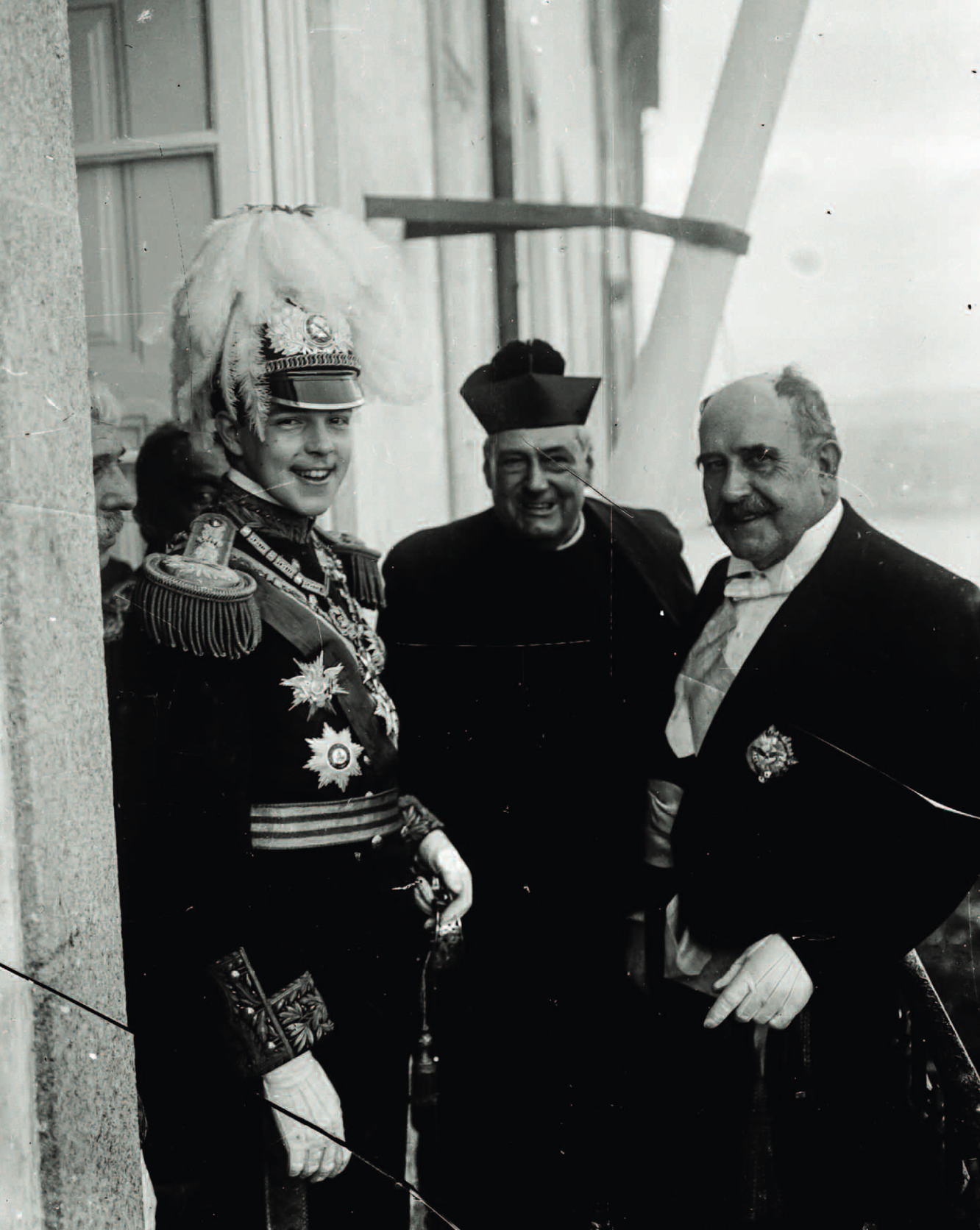
Manuel II with the Civil Governor of Porto on the King's national trip in 1908.

For his part, the new King tried to increase the monarchy's connection with its subjects. The King visited several areas of the country. His trips included stops in Porto, Braga, Viana do Castelo, Oliveira de Azeméis, Santo Tirso, Vila Nova de Gaia, Aveiro, Guimarães, Coimbra and Barcelos. During these visits, his subjects were captivated by the young king, and he was received warmly. On 23 November he travelled to Espinho in open the Vale do Vouga Railway. On his journeys, he ingratiated himself with the people with his candour and pious character.

However, he was not popular with republicans. One of them, João Chagas, the anti-monarchist journalist and propagandist of the Republican Party, warned the King of the problems that would develop when he declared:

... your Highness arrives too young into a very old world ...!

=== Social issues ===
During the 19th century, many intellectuals and politicians were preoccupied with the growth of the urban proletariat as a consequence of the Industrial Revolution. In Portugal, owing to lower levels of industrialisation, this was not an important question, but it was exacerbated by an economic crisis and the Republican Party, who believed a republic would resolve the problems. This was the Questão Social (social question) of the times.

The Socialist Party had existed since 1875, but it never had representation in Parliament. This was not only because it was not popular, but also because the Republican Party was the principal channel of radical discontent within the political system. The King made some moves that did not infringe his constitutional restrictions, but which created incentives for the Socialist Party to lessen their support for the Republican Party. In 1909, Manuel invited the French sociologist, Léon Poinsard, to examine the social environment and report back to him. Poinsard wrote that the only way to combat clientelism, created by the system of rotational governments, would be a reorganisation of the local administrations. Enthusiastically, the King wrote to the President of the Council of Ministers Wenceslau de Sousa Pereira de Lima, to make him aware of the reorganisation of the Socialist Party (under Alfredo Aquiles Monteverde) and to remind him of the importance of working with the Socialists, "...so that, we will empty their supporters from the Republican Party, and orient them into a useful and productive force."

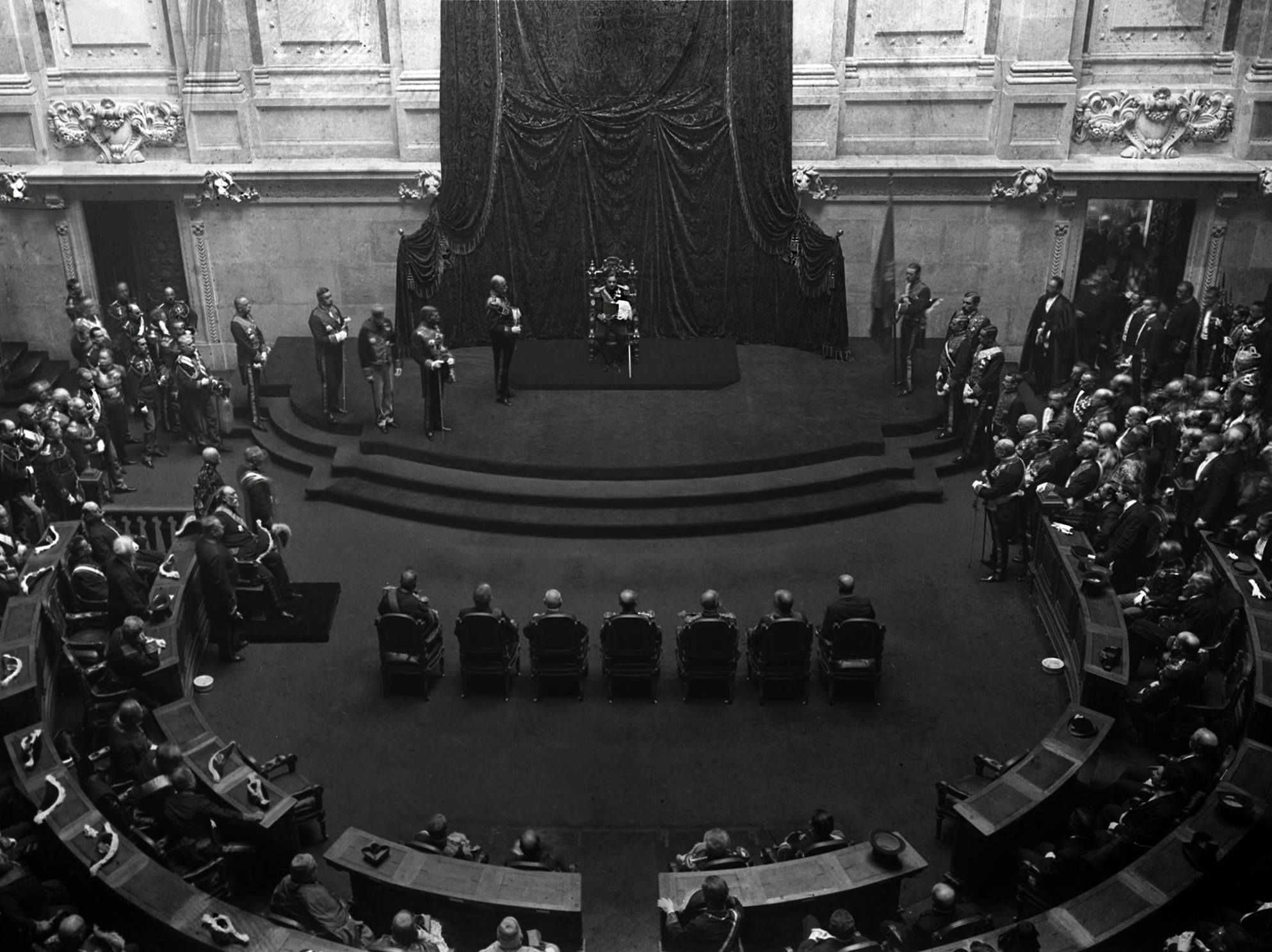
King Manuel II delivering the Crown speech at the opening of the Parliament in Lisbon, 1908.

Notwithstanding the contacts made by the government of Artur Alberto de Campos Henriques with the Socialist Azedo Gneco, Venceslau de Lima considered this difficult after the Congresso Nacional Operário, which was boycotted by anarchists and republicans. For their part, the Socialists were enthusiastic about Royal support between Manuel and Aquiles Monteverde. Monteverde would later inform the King of the failure of the October 1909 trade union congress, but little was formalised between the socialists and the government, although they supported the work of Poinsard. During the government of António Teixeira de Sousa, in July 1910, that the government created a commission to study the establishment of an Instituto de Trabalho Nacional ("Institute of National Work"), that had three socialists and included Azedo Gneco. However, Aquiles Monteverde would complain that the commission lacked the resources to be effective: specifically that permanent members and unlimited transport, in order for the Socialists to promote their propaganda. Manuel II informed the government, through the Minister of Public Works, that he agreed with the establishment of the Instituto de Trabalho Nacional, but by September, it was too late for the constitutional monarchy.

During his reign he visited many parts of northern Portugal, in addition to Spain, France, and the United Kingdom, where he was appointed Knight of the Order of the Garter, in November 1909. He cultivated a foreign policy that was close to Great Britain, which was not only the geo-political strategy that his father maintained, but it also reinforced his position on the throne by having a strong ally. The court also considered the marriage of a King of the House of Braganza to a British princess would secure the protection of the United Kingdom in any impending conflict. But, the country's instability, the assassination of the King and Prince Royal, and the drawn-out negotiations that were ended with the death of Edward VII, ended these pretensions. The old British monarch, a personal friend of Carlos, would have been the great protector of the House of Braganza, and without him, the liberal government of Britain had no interest in maintaining the Portuguese monarchy.

== Revolution ==
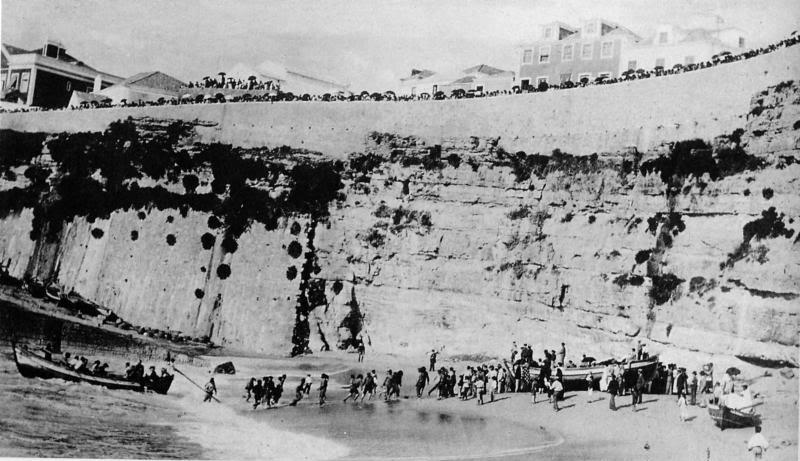
Manuel II and the Portuguese Royal Family survived the revolution by fleeing on the royal yacht from the beach below the cliffs at Ericeira.

The stability of the government deteriorated; seven governments were established and fell in a period of 24 months. The monarchist parties continued to fragment, while the Republican Party continued to gain ground. The legislative elections on 28 August 1910 had elected 14 new representatives (resulting in an assembly that was divided: 9% Republican, 58% Government and 33% Opposition) which helped the revolutionary cause, but which made little importance since the Setúbal Congress (on 24–25 April 1909) had determined that the Republicans would take power by force. The murder of a prominent republican precipitated the coup d'état that had been so long in coming.

During the waning days of King Manuel II's reign, Prior Sardo besought the monarch to bestow Gafanha da Nazaré with a parish, achieving royal recognition, marking the last town to receive such acknowledgment. This historic event was officially documented in Diário do Governo nº 206 on 16 September 1910.

Between 4 and 5 October 1910, the Republican Revolution erupted in the streets of Lisbon. What started as a military coup commenced by soldiers, was joined by some civilians and municipal guards attacking the loyal garrisons and the royal palace, while the guns from the cruiser NRP Adamastor added to the cannonade. The Palace of Necessidades (then official residence of the young King) was bombarded, forcing Manuel to move to the Mafra National Palace, where he rendezvoused with his mother, Queen Amélia, and his grandmother, the Queen Mother Maria Pia of Savoy. There was little apparent popular reaction to these events: pictures from the square in front of the City Hall in Lisbon, where the declaration of the Republic occurred, did not show an overwhelming multitude, and even some in the military were fearful that their actions would not be successful. One republican commander, Admiral Cândido dos Reis, even committed suicide when he believed that the events had not succeeded.

One day later, once it was clear that the Republicans had taken the country, Manuel decided to embark from Ericeira on the royal yacht Amélia IV for Porto, with armed Republicans arriving as the ship departed. It is unclear whether his advisers motivated Manuel to change his intentions (Note: Commander Castelo Branco had warned the King that it was dangerous to take such a route.) or whether he was forced to change his destination en route, but the Royal Family disembarked in Gibraltar after they received notice that Porto had fallen to the Republicans. The coup d'état was complete, and the Royal Family departed for exile, (Note: The Marquês de Soveral had already suggested that King George V send an escort to Gibraltar to protect the Royal Family. In response, the British government suggested that the personal yacht Victoria and Albert should be sent in order not to create tensions with the republican government in Lisbon.) arriving in the United Kingdom, where they were received by King George V.

== Exile ==
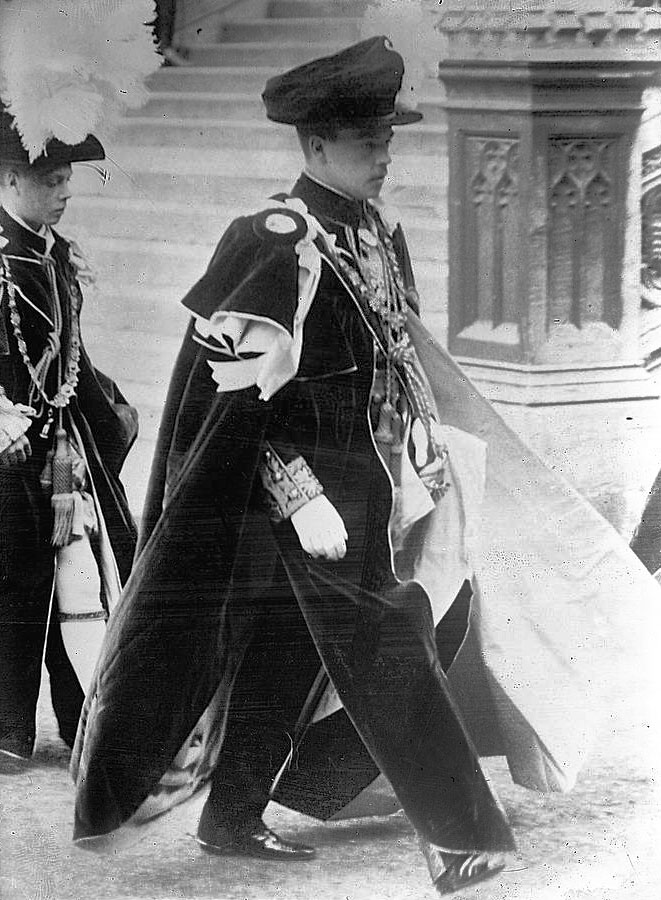
Manuel II in full Garter dress during a 1911 Order of the Garter procession.

In exile, Manuel resided in Fulwell Park, Twickenham, now in London (where his mother had been born). At Fulwell Park he tried to recreate a Portuguese environment, as the attempts to restore him to his throne (1911, 1912 and 1919) failed. He was active in the local community, attended services at the Church of St James, Twickenham, and became godfather to several children. In 1932 he donated a window to St James Church bearing the Braganza crest and depicting St Anthony to celebrate the 700th anniversary of the saint's death. His influence is also recalled by a number of toponymic references in the area: Manuel Road, Lisbon Avenue, and Portugal Gardens. He followed political events in Portugal, and was concerned with the anarchy of the First Republic, fearing that it could provoke a Spanish intervention and risk the country's independence.

While in exile, there was one case where the former King's direct intervention had an effect. After the overthrow of the government of Gomes da Costa by General Óscar Fragoso Carmona in 1926, Costa was appointed Ambassador to London. Given the rapid succession of ambassadors during this period, the British government refused to recognise the new official's credentials. As the ambassador was to negotiate the liquidation of the Portuguese debt to the United Kingdom, the Minister of Foreign Affairs asked Manuel to straighten out the situation. The former monarch was delighted by the opportunity to help his homeland and communicated with many of his British contacts (including, probably, King George V) in order to resolve the dispute. Even in exile Manuel continued to be a patriot, going as far as declaring in his 1915 testament his intention to transfer his possessions to the Portuguese State for the creation of a museum, and showing his interest in being buried in Portugal.

=== World War I ===
Manuel defended the entry of Portugal into the First World War and its active participation. He asked monarchists to desist from restoration efforts as long as the war continued. He even met with republicans, and at one time sought to rejoin the Portuguese army. But, contrary to his hopes, a majority of the monarchists did not follow his pleas for cooperation. Many of them backed the aspirations of Germany, and had hoped to see the victory of the Kaiser as another channel to restore the monarchy. Manuel believed that supporting Great Britain would guarantee the retention of overseas colonies, which would have been lost to German aggression even if the Germans were supported in the conflict. Of his close subordinates who offered their support to the Republic, none were accepted.

Manuel attempted to make himself available to the Allied Powers, wherever they saw use, but was disappointed when he was assigned a post in the British Red Cross. He characteristically put all his efforts into the role, participating in conferences, fund drives, visits to hospitals and the wounded soldiers on the front, which ultimately gave him a lot of gratification. Manuel's visits to the front were perceived as causing some political embarrassment to the French government, but his friendship with George V was sufficient to alleviate their concerns. Regardless, most of his efforts were not credited; years later, in an interview with António Ferro, he lamented, "The operating room in the Portuguese Hospital in Paris, during the War, was constructed by me. Do you know what they put on the plaque? 'From a Portuguese in London'." The King was also responsible for the creation of the Orthopedic Department at Shepherd's Bush Hospital which, at his insistence continued to function until 1925, in order to continue to treat the disfiguring effects of the war. A proof of his recognition by the British was by his friend King George V, who invited him to be with the King during the victory celebrations during the parade of soldiers in 1919.

== Monarchy and its status ==
Since 1911, the Portuguese monarchists-in-exile had concentrated in Galicia, Spain, in order to enter Portugal and restore the monarchy but without the tacit approval of the Spanish government. The monarchists were led by the charismatic Henrique Mitchell de Paiva Couceiro, a veteran of the African colonial campaigns. The Paladin, as the Portuguese newspapers called him, believed that demonstrating a show of force would force the rural people to rise-up and support the restoration. But he was wrong; poorly prepared and badly financed, his forces encountered apathy from the rural population and the incursions ended with retreats into Galicia.

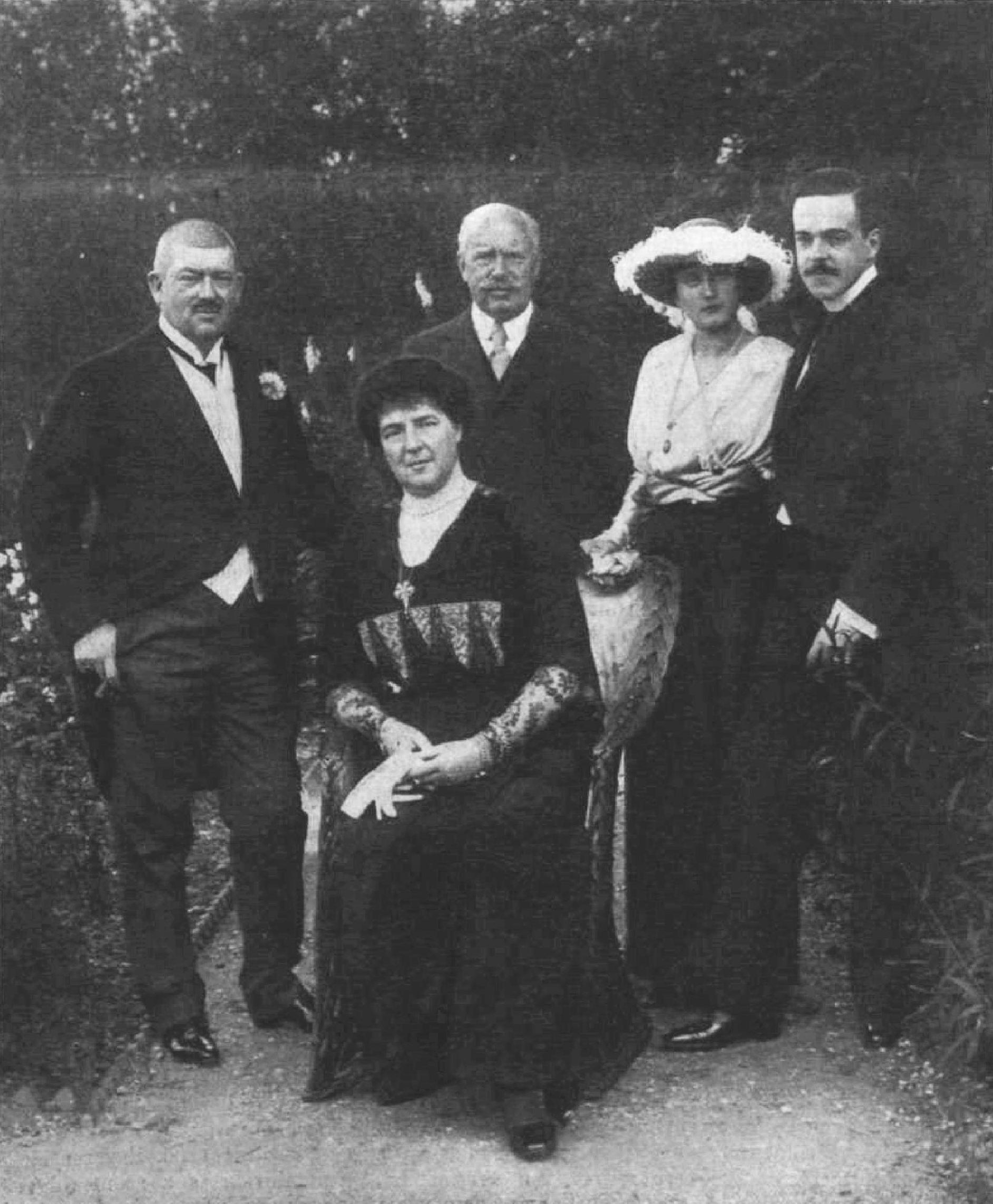
Manuel II (right), with his mother Amélie (seated) and wife Augusta; 1913.

For his part, Manuel supported these incursions the best way he could, but his financial resources were limited. He also faced a group of monarchists who were not clear supporters of his claim to the throne: one attack was made under a blue and white flag, but without the crown, while Paiva Couceiro himself declared at one time that his movement was "neutral" and wanted a plebiscite on the form of the new regime. It was only after he traded correspondence with Couceiro that the King was able to support the Galician monarchists, who had promised to support the Constitutional Charter of 1826. The second incursion, in 1912, although better prepared did not succeed because the Spanish government was forced to cede to Republican diplomats the illegality of monarchist encampments in Galicia and disarmed the remaining combatants within its territory. Manuel was never able to restore his kingdom by force and always defended that the monarchists should organise internally in order to reach power legally (by elections). This was not accepted by militant monarchists who, in the following years, continued their badly prepared attempts to restore the monarchy (for example on 20 October 1914), creating anarchy in the streets. His preoccupation worsened at the beginning of the Great War: Manuel was fearful that the United Kingdom would ally with Spain, in light of Portugal's instability, and that Spain would want to annex Portugal, as the price for Spain's entry into the War.

=== Dover Pact ===
After the failure of the first monarchist incursion, and with Manuel II appearing relatively unenthusiastic for a restoration of the monarchy (and entirely against armed counter-revolution), another group of royalists attempted to legitimise the claims of the descendants of Miguel I to the throne. In order to counter this, the King allegedly entered into direct negotiations with the Duke of Braganza's representatives: he attempted to establish himself as the rightful king and, according to the Integralismo Lusitano group, he recognised the descendants of Miguel as being in line to the throne of Portugal. There is no proof of an encounter between Manuel II and Miguel in Dover on 30 January 1912. The results of the supposed meeting remain controversial: although there was an accord on challenging the republic, there remained no clear agreement on hereditary lines of succession, and Manuel II still retained his claim to the throne.

=== Monarchy of the North ===
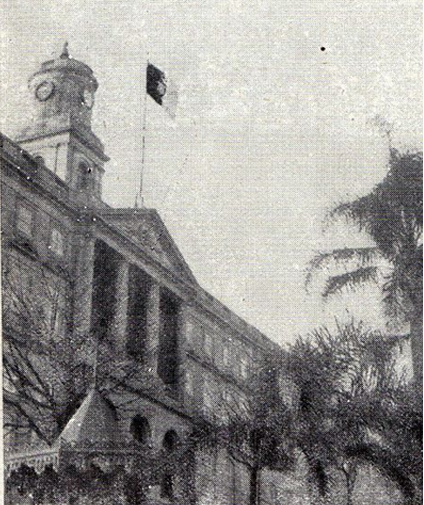
The "Monarchy of the North" was proclaimed in Porto on 18 January 1919.

Some monarchists continued unsuccessful counter-revolutionary activities during the War, while the former King continued to condemn their actions and to exhort them to restore the monarchy at the ballot-box. This option seemed viable after the dictatorship of General Pimenta de Castro (January 1915) broke the momentum of the Democratic Party, who attempted to garner sympathies from the conservative right, by removing restrictions imposed on monarchist groups on 5 October. Between April and May 1915, 55 monarchist centres opened (33 in the north and 12 in the centre of the country), causing many republicans to close ranks and on 14 May 1915 the revolution returned to the streets, when 15,000 armed civilians and Naval personnel tried to maintain the loyalty of the Army to the government. After three days of combat 500 deaths and more than 1,000 wounded, the Democratic Party retained control and the monarchist groups were once again declared illegal. During the Sidónio Pais government, Pais cultivated support from conservative factions and incorporated a re-establishment of a regime based on universal male suffrage. His assassination allowed moderate republicans to re-establish control, but the creation of military juntas in the provinces of the north, with monarchist tendencies, created expectations of a possible monarchist restoration through a military coup d'état.

Manuel continued to plead for calm at the end of the War; while not abandoning the possibility of taking action in the future, he insisted on waiting to the end of peace negotiations in Paris: he was fearful that continued anarchy in Portugal would prejudice its negotiating position. But, for Paiva Couceiro and the other Integralists, this was the moment: they awaited the royal authorisation of the King's adjunct Aires de Ornelas. Receiving a memorandum that requested this authorisation, and convinced that this action would not occur immediately, Ornelas wrote on the margin, Go on. Palavras de El-Rei, and signed the document. On 19 January 1919 a thousand soldiers, including some artillery, under the command of Paiva Couceiro occupied Porto, in order to restore the Constitutional Monarchy, and its King Manuel II. A provisional government was established that controlled Minho, Trás-os-Montes (with the exception of Chaves, Mirandela and Vila Real), as well as part of the district of Aveiro, but contrary to Couceiro's expectations, the rest of the country did not rise.

In Lisbon, Aires de Ornelas was caught completely by surprise, but he could not escape with other monarchists to the safety of the 2nd Regimental Lancers, in Ajuda. There the number of refugees, who suffered as the republican reprisals increased, and the commander removed his forces and those civilians, marching them to Monsanto, where the 4th, 7th and 9th Cavalry and the 30th Infantry Battery from Belém were entrenched. Aires de Ornelas wavered in his support, which risked the possibility that Integralists would transfer their loyalty to Miguel's supporters, or assume the leadership of the monarchist movement. In a small area, and circled by Republican forces, the monarchists surrendered on 24 January. With the failure of the Restoration in the centre and south of the country, luck turned on Paiva Couceiro. On 13 February a part of the Republican National Guard deserted and restored the Republic in Porto. Those monarchists who did not escape were incarcerated and subsequently sentenced to long-term imprisonment. The King, in exile, did not hear of the failure and was informed only after reading the reports in the newspapers.

=== Paris Pact ===
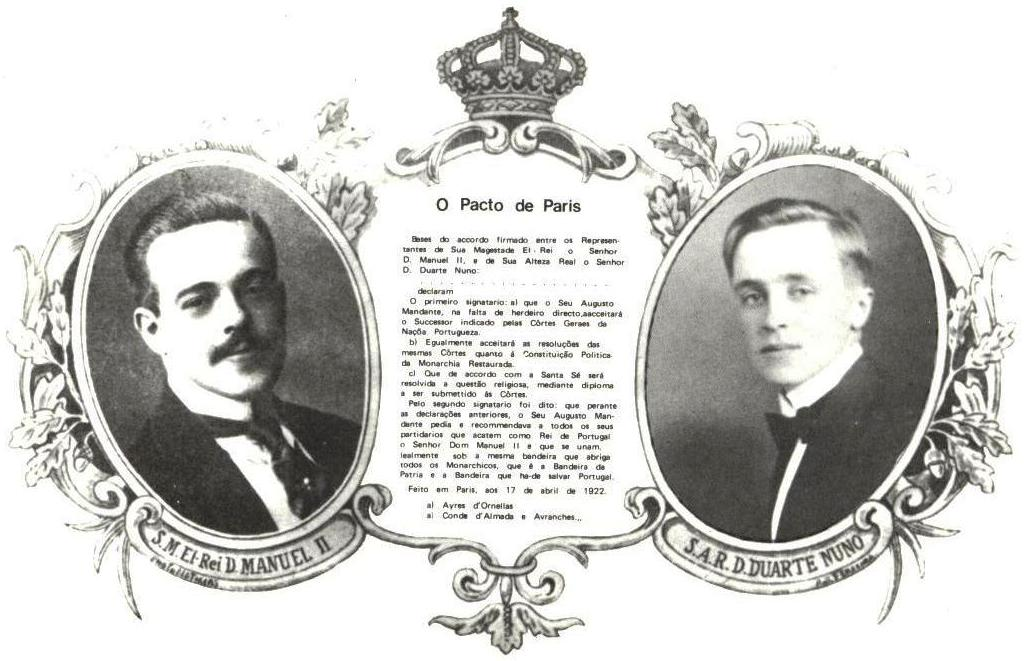
The Pact of Paris in a postcard published by the Integralismo Lusitano group in 1922.

Although it is not likely that such a pact took place, it is said that in 1922, with cooling of relations between monarchists of the Integralismo Lusitano and the King, and mindful that his marriage to Augusta Victória had not produced heirs, Manuel, in a Paris meeting in April 1922, represented by his adjunct Aires de Ornelas, and Miguelist representatives Infanta Adelgundes, who was by now calling herself Duchess of Guimarães, and tutor to Duarte Nuno, agreed that owing to an heir, the rights of succession would pass to Duarte Nuno. Integralists disagreed because, in their view, the agreement failed to make reference to the reestablishment of a traditional monarchy, which was fundamental to their assertions. Integralismo Lusitano withheld their support, and in September 1925, Aldegundes, in a letter to Manuel, repudiated the agreement owing the continue operation of the Constitutional Newspaper (the Integralist paper was closed as part of the accord) and the lack of Integralist participation.

== Death ==
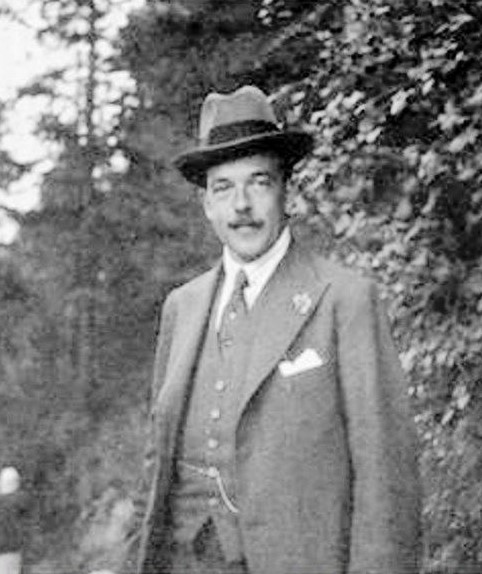
Manuel II just hours before his death at Fulwell Park; 2 July 1932.

King Manuel died unexpectedly in his residence on 2 July 1932, via suffocation following an attack of "acute oedema of the glottis", a swelling of the narrow opening at the upper end of the larynx, or tracheal oedema. The Portuguese government, at that time led by António Oliveira de Salazar, authorised his burial in Lisbon, after a state funeral. His body arrived in Lisbon on 2 August 1932, on board the British cruiser HMS Concord which had made the journey from the United Kingdom and sailed into the Tagus River to deliver the coffin of the former King. The body was received at Praça do Comércio, where a crowd of people had gathered to follow the coffin to São Vicente de Fora and the roads were inundated with people interested in seeing the funeral procession. His body was interred in the Pantheon of the House of Braganza in the Monastery of São Vicente de Fora.

His death has been regarded as suspicious by some because he had been playing tennis on 1 July and was apparently in excellent health. An incident surrounding his sudden death was mentioned in the autobiography of Harold Brust, a member of Scotland Yard Special Branch in charge of protecting public figures. In his memoirs, Brust speaks of an incident which probably occurred in 1931 in which an intruder was discovered in the grounds of Fulwell Park who, when arrested, the Police confirmed as being a prominent member of a Portuguese republican terrorist group known as the Carbonária and who was subsequently deported to Lisbon. To date the identity of the intruder has not been confirmed. Questions remain as to the reason for the man's intrusion.

After King Manuel's death, the Portuguese National Assembly, under António de Oliveira Salazar's dictatorship, authorised the return of the banned branch of the Braganzas (ex-King Miguel's descendants) on 27 May 1950, repealing the laws of exile of 19 December 1834 and 15 October 1910, and founded, with the sale of the King's English estate and some of his remaining personal possessions, the Foundation of the House of Braganza, according to King Manuel's desire to leave his personal fortune to the Portuguese people.

== Legacy ==
Given the Portuguese tradition of nicknaming their monarchs, king Manuel II was given several of them which differed from each other according to political ideology, the monarchists gave him more positive nicknames such as O Patriota ('The Patriot') for his preoccupation with the national identity, or O Rei-Saudade ('The Missed King'), for the longing that was felt when the monarchy was abolished. More generally, he's nicknamed O Desventurado ('The Unfortunate'), because he lost his throne to the Republic; and O Estudioso or O Bibliófilo ('The Studious' or 'The Bibliophile') for his love for Portuguese literature.

=== Personal life ===
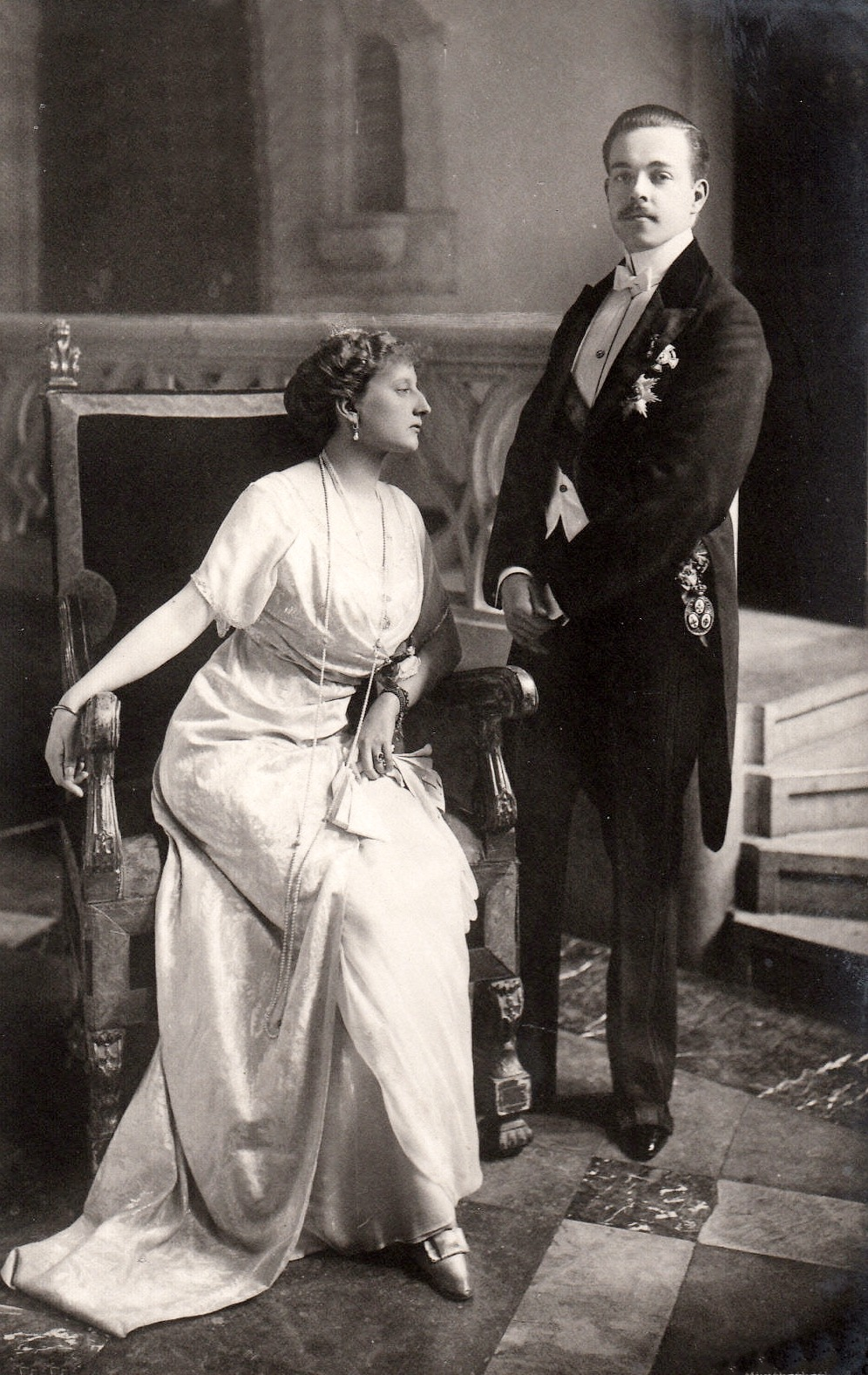
King Manuel II and his wife, Augusta Victoria

In the spring of 1912, Manuel visited Switzerland, where he met Princess Augusta Victoria of Hohenzollern (1890–1966), daughter of William, Prince of Hohenzollern, and was deeply impressed by her. They were second cousins, both being great-grandchildren of Maria II.

In the following year, on 4 September 1913, Manuel married Augusta Victoria. During the Mass, which was celebrated in the Chapel of Sigmaringen Castle, Manuel, wearing his Order of the Garter Star and the sash of the Three Portuguese Orders, stood on a crate containing soil brought from Portugal. The ceremony was conducted by Cardinal José Sebastião de Almeida Neto, Patriarch of Lisbon, then exiled in Seville, who had baptised Manuel as a young prince; Manuel was also assisted by the Prince of Wales (Edward VIII) and King Alfonso XIII of Spain, as well as representatives of the royal houses of Europe (including Spain, Germany, Italy, France and Romania, in addition to the principalities and German kingdoms). After festivities which lasted two days, the couple went on their honeymoon to Munich, where the Princess fell ill and withdrew from the public.

=== Bibliographer ===
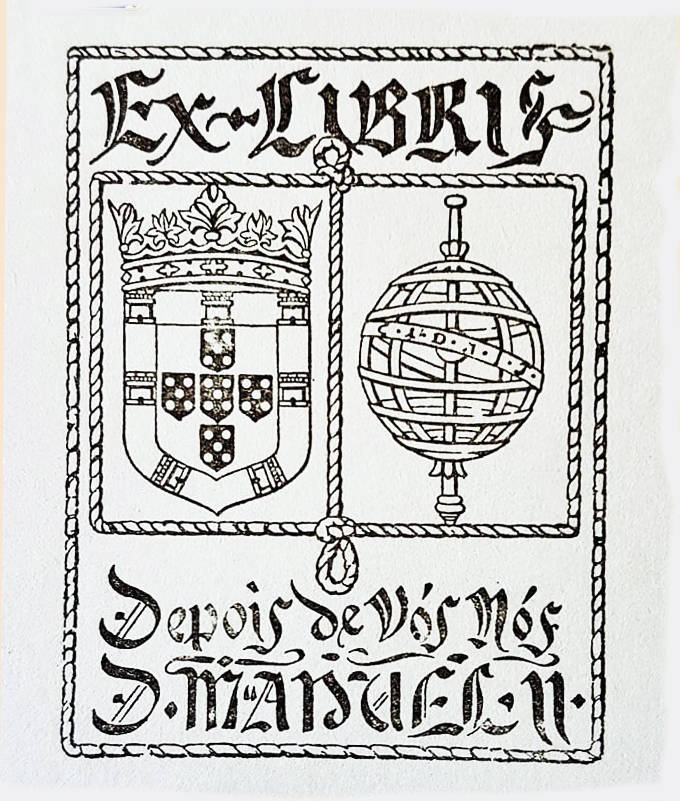
Ex libris of Manuel, used to indicate the ownership of his books, below his personal motto: After you we (Portuguese: Depois de vós nós).

Manuel was always an avid reader and, during his exile, dedicated himself to the study of literature, penning treatises on Medieval and Renaissance literature in Portugal. Following the First World War and with more free time, apart from his contacts with monarchist organisations, he dedicated himself to these studies (a tradition that was instilled in him by his father). Initially, he was interested in writing a biography, and began research on a biography of Manuel I of Portugal, who he believed was badly treated by other historians. He contracted the services of the bibliographer Maurice Ettinghausen in 1919, to find older books for his project, and was helped by the dissolution of many private collections after the implementation of the Republic.

By 1926, Manuel had abandoned the idea of a biography and concentrated on descriptions of older books in his library (itself, a complete library of older works). More than a simple list, the work allowed Manuel to write of the glories of Portugal, writing not just a bibliography but also an examination of the authors and the context of their writings. His interpretation was scientifically rigorous, and resulted in a final work that was marked by a nationalism and the exaltation of ancestral valor. His examples were limited and illustrated by facsimiled copies of the works, both written in English and Portuguese. The first volume of the work Livros Antigos Portuguezes 1489–1600, da Bibliotheca de Sua Magestade Fidelíssima Descriptos por S. M. El-Rey D. Manuel em Três volumes was published in 1929. Manuel delivered, by hand, a copy of his work to his friend George V at Windsor Castle. The work was received well by critics, and the King dedicated himself to the second volume, which covered the period 1540 to 1569. But the project was terminated prematurely in 1932, when Manuel died unexpectedly: the third volume was posthumously published under the supervision of his librarian, Margery Withers. His completed works gave the King a respectful reputation among Portuguese historians, and his bust was added to the entrance atrium of the National Library in Lisbon.

== Honours ==
National

- Grand Cross of the Sash of the Two Orders
- Gold Medal of the Royal Humanitarian Society of Porto

He became Grand Master of all Portuguese orders upon his accession to the throne.

Foreign

- (Austrian Empire) (Kingdom of Hungary) Austria-Hungary:
  - Gold Jubilee Court Medal, 1898
  - Grand Cross of the Royal Hungarian Order of St. Stephen, 1909
- United Kingdom:
  - Honorary Grand Cross of the Royal Victorian Order, 21 November 1904
  - Stranger Knight Companion of the Garter, 16 November 1909
  - Commemorative Medal for the Coronation of King George V, 22 June 1911
  - British War Medal (1914–1918), 26 July 1919
- France:
  - Legion of Honour (Grand Cross) (Note: French: Légion d'honneur - Grand-croix) (France), 31 December 1905
  - (Kingdom of France) French Royal Family: Knight of the Holy Spirit
- Sovereign Military Order of Malta: Bailiff Grand Cross of Honour and Devotion, 22 January 1907
- Holy See: Grand Cross of the Holy Sepulchre of Jerusalem, 2 February 1908
- Spain:
  - Knight of the Golden Fleece, 14 May 1908
  - Grand Cross of the Order of Charles III, 15 February 1909
- Russian Empire:
  - Knight of St. Andrew, 17 May 1908
  - Knight of St. Alexander Nevsky, 17 May 1908
  - Knight of the White Eagle, 17 May 1908
  - Knight of St. Anna, 1st Class, 17 May 1908
  - Knight of St. Stanislaus, 1st Class, 17 May 1908
- Kingdom of Italy:
  - Knight of the Annunciation, 27 May 1908
  - Gold Medal of Merit for the Messina Earthquake, 1908
- Belgium:
  - Order of Leoopold (Grand Cordon) (Belgium) (military), 12 July 1908
- German Empire:
  - Knight of the Black Eagle, 19 August 1908
  - Grand Cross of the Red Eagle, 19 August 1908
  - Hohenzollern: Cross of Honour of the Princely House Order of Hohenzollern, 1st Class
- Netherlands: Grand Cross of the Netherlands Lion, 21 September 1908
- Kingdom of Romania: Grand Cross of the Order of Carol I, 1908
- Sweden: Knight of the Seraphim, 27 February 1909
- Denmark: Knight of the Elephant, 24 March 1909
- Monaco: Grand Cross of St. Charles, 13 August 1909
- Norway: Grand Cross of St. Olav, with Collar, 9 September 1909
- Empire of Japan: Grand Cordon of the Order of the Chrysanthemum

== Ancestry ==
Ancestors of Manuel II of Portugal

8. Ferdinand II of Portugal
4. Luís I of Portugal
9. Maria II of Portugal
2. Carlos I of Portugal
10. Victor Emmanuel II of Italy
5. Princess Maria Pia of Savoy
11. Archduchess Adelaide of Austria
1. Manuel II of Portugal
12. Prince Ferdinand Philippe, Duke of Orléans
6. Prince Philippe, Count of Paris
13. Duchess Helene of Mecklenburg-Schwerin
3. Princess Amélie of Orléans
14. Prince Antoine, Duke of Montpensier
7. Princess Marie Isabelle of Orléans
15. Infanta Luisa Fernanda of Spain

== Bibliography ==
- Great Dynasties. New York: Mayflower Books Inc. 1980. ISBN 0-8317-3966-5.
- Benton, Russell Earl (1975). "The Downfall of a King: Dom Manuel II of Portugal". LSU Historical Dissertations and Theses. 2818.
- Ferro, António (1954). D. Manuel II, O Desventurado (in Portuguese). Lisbon: Livraria Bertrand.
- Guerreiro, Luís (2007). "Memorial do Regicido" (in Portuguese). Lisbon: Aliança Internacional Monárquica Portuguesa. Archived from the original on 29 May 2010.
- Hindley, Geoffrey (1979). The Royal Families of Europe. London: McGraw-Hill Book Company. ISBN 0-07-093530-0.
- Honrado, Fernando (1993). Da Ericeira a Gibraltar vai um Rei (in Portuguese). Lisbon: Acontecimento. pp. 91–93.
- Newitt, Malyn (15 October 2019). The Braganzas: The Rise and Fall of the Ruling Dynasties of Portugal and Brazil, 1640–1910. Reaktion Books. ISBN 978-1-78914-165-8.
- Nobre, Eduardo (2002). Paixões Reais (in Portuguese). Lisbon: Quimera Editores Lda.
- Proença, Maria Cândida (2006). "D. Manuel II". Reis de Portugal (in Portuguese). Lisbon: Círculo de Leitores.
- Rezende, João Vieira (1936). Monografia da Gafanha (in Portuguese). Ílhavo: Gráfica Ilhavense.

Manuel II of Portugal House of Braganza Cadet branch of the House of Aviz and House of Saxe-Coburg and Gotha Born: 19 March 1889 Died: 2 July 1932
Regnal titles
Preceded by Carlos I	King of Portugal; 1 February 1908 – 5 October 1910	Vacant Republic declared under Teófilo Braga
Portuguese royalty
Preceded by João Maria	Duke of Beja; 19 October 1889 – 1 February 1908	Vacant
Titles in pretence
Loss of title Monarchy abolished	— TITULAR — King of Portugal; 5 October 1910 – 2 July 1932	Succeeded by Duarte Nuno
