= Ferreira do Amaral =

Ferreira do Amaral may refer to:

- João Maria Ferreira do Amaral (1803–1849), military and politician
- Francisco Joaquim Ferreira do Amaral (1843–1923), military and politician, son of the above
- João Maria Ferreira do Amaral II (1876–1931), military, illegitimate son of the above
- João Maria Barreto Ferreira do Amaral, 2nd Baron of Oliveira Lima (1909–?), son of the above
- Joaquim Martins Ferreira do Amaral (born 1945)
