= August 22 =

August 22 this year in various calendars
- Saturday, 22 August 2026
Akan	Nwonamemene
Armenian	3 Hoṙi 1476
Aztec	Atemoztli 4, 4 Malīnalli
Babylonian	8 Abu, 2337 SE
Balinese pawukon	Menga, Beteng, Laba, Umanis, Aryang, Saniscara of Medangkungan, Indra, Jangur, Sri
Bengali	7 Bhadro, BS 1433
Chinese	Yang Earth Dragon・Root Mansion; Fire Horse Year, Month 7, Day 10 (Liqiu, 1 day until Chushu)
Common Era	22 August 2026 CE
Coptic	16 Mesori, AM 1742
Egyptian	8 Tybi, 2775 NE
Ethiopian	16 Naḥasē, 2018 Amätä Məhrät
French Republican	Décade I, Quintidi de Fructidor de l'Année 234 de la République
Gregorian	22 August, AD 2026
Hebrew	9 Elul, AM 5786
Hindu	Jyeṣṭhā・Vaidhṛti; Solar: 6 Bhādrapada, 1948 SE; Lunisolar: Daśamī, Śukla pakṣa of Śrāvaṇa, 2083 VE; Rāudra・5127 KY・1,872,809
Icelandic	Laugardagur, 28 Heyannir 2026
Islamic	8 Rabi' al-awwal, AH 1448 (using tabular method)
ISO week date	2026-W34-6
Japanese	10 Fumizuki, Reiwa 8 (Risshū, 1 day until Shosho)
Julian	9 August, AD 2026 (AM 7534)
Julian day	2461275
Korean	10 Wonsungidal, 4359 DE
Maya	13.0.13.15.12; 5 Mol, 4 Eb
Roman	ante diem V Idus Augustas, MMDCCLXXIX AUC
Solar Hijri	31 Mordad, SH 1405
Tibetan	10 gro bzhin, me pho rta 2153 or 1772 or 1000

<<	August					>>
Su	Mo	Tu	We	Th	Fr	Sa
						1
2	3	4	5	6	7	8
9	10	11	12	13	14	15
16	17	18	19	20	21	22
23	24	25	26	27	28	29
30	31
2026

August 22 in recent years
2026 (Saturday)
2025 (Friday)
2024 (Thursday)
2023 (Tuesday)
2022 (Monday)
2021 (Sunday)
2020 (Saturday)
2019 (Thursday)
2018 (Wednesday)
2017 (Tuesday)

August 22 is the 234th day of the year (235th in leap years) in the Gregorian calendar; 131 days remain until the end of the year.

== Events ==
=== Pre-1600 ===
- 392 – Arbogast has Eugenius elected Western Roman Emperor.
- 851 – Battle of Jengland: Erispoe defeats Charles the Bald near the Breton town of Jengland, halting the expansion of West Francia.
- 1138 – Battle of the Standard between Scotland and England.
- 1153 – Crusader–Fatimid wars: The fortress of Ascalon is surrendered by Fatimid Egypt to an army of crusaders, Templars, and Hospitallers led by King Baldwin III of Jerusalem.
- 1485 – The Battle of Bosworth Field occurs; King Richard III of England's death in battle marks the end of the reigning Plantagenet dynasty and the beginning of the Tudors under Henry VII.
- 1559 – Spanish archbishop Bartolomé Carranza is arrested for heresy.

=== 1601–1900 ===
- 1614 – Fettmilch uprising: Jews are expelled from Frankfurt, Holy Roman Empire, following the plundering of the Judengasse.
- 1639 – Madras (now Chennai), India, is founded by the British East India Company on a sliver of land bought from local Nayak rulers.
- 1642 – Charles I raises his standard in Nottingham, which marks the beginning of the English Civil War.
- 1654 – Jacob Barsimson arrives in New Amsterdam. He is the first known Jewish immigrant to America.
- 1703 – A janissary revolt forces the deposition of Ottoman sultan Mustafa II.
- 1711 – Britain's Quebec Expedition loses eight ships and almost nine hundred soldiers, sailors and women to rocks at Pointe-aux-Anglais.
- 1717 – Spanish troops land on Sardinia.
- 1770 – James Cook names and lands on Possession Island, and claims the east coast of Australia for Britain as New South Wales.
- 1777 – British forces abandon the Siege of Fort Stanwix after hearing rumors of Continental Army reinforcements.
- 1780 – James Cook's ship HMS Resolution returns to England (Cook having been killed on Hawaii during the voyage).
- 1791 – The Haitian slave revolution begins in Saint-Domingue, Haiti.
- 1798 – French troops land at Kilcummin, County Mayo, Ireland to aid the rebellion.
- 1827 – José de La Mar becomes President of Peru.
- 1846 – The Second Federal Republic of Mexico is established.
- 1849 – Passaleão incident: João Maria Ferreira do Amaral, the governor of Portuguese Macau, is assassinated by a group of Chinese locals, triggering a military confrontation between China and Portugal at the Battle of Passaleão three days later.
- 1851 – The first America's Cup is won by the yacht America.
- 1864 – Twelve nations sign the First Geneva Convention, establishing the rules of protection of the victims of armed conflicts.
- 1875 – The Treaty of Saint Petersburg between Japan and Russia is ratified, providing for the exchange of Sakhalin for the Kuril Islands.
- 1894 – Mahatma Gandhi forms the Natal Indian Congress (NIC) in order to fight discrimination against Indian traders in Natal.

=== 1901–present ===
- 1902 – The Cadillac Motor Company is founded.
- 1902 – Theodore Roosevelt becomes the first President of the United States to make a public appearance in an automobile.
- 1902 – At least 6,000 people are killed by the magnitude 7.7 Kashgar earthquake in the Tien Shan mountains.
- 1922 – Michael Collins, Commander-in-chief of the Irish Free State Army, is shot dead in an ambush during the Irish Civil War.
- 1934 – Bill Woodfull of Australia becomes the only test cricket captain to twice regain The Ashes.
- 1942 – Brazil declares war on Germany, Japan and Italy.
- 1944 – World War II: Holocaust of Kedros in Crete by German forces.
- 1949 – The Queen Charlotte earthquake is Canada's strongest since the 1700 Cascadia earthquake.
- 1953 – The penal colony on Devil's Island is permanently closed.
- 1962 – The OAS attempts to assassinate French president Charles de Gaulle.
- 1963 – X-15 Flight 91 reaches the highest altitude of the X-15 program (107.96 km (67.08 mi) (354,200 feet)).
- 1965 – Juan Marichal, pitcher for the San Francisco Giants, strikes John Roseboro, catcher for the Los Angeles Dodgers, on the head with a bat, sparking a 14-minute brawl, one of the most violent on-field incidents in sports history.
- 1966 – Labor movements NFWA and AWOC merge to become the United Farm Workers Organizing Committee (UFWOC), the predecessor of the United Farm Workers.
- 1968 – Pope Paul VI arrives in Bogotá, Colombia. It is the first visit of a pope to Latin America.
- 1971 – J. Edgar Hoover and John Mitchell announce the arrest of 20 of the Camden 28.
- 1972 – Rhodesia is expelled by the IOC for its racist policies.
- 1973 – The Congress of Chile votes in favour of a resolution condemning President Salvador Allende's government and demands that he resign or else be unseated through force and new elections.
- 1978 – Nicaraguan Revolution: The FSLN seizes the National Congress of Nicaragua, along with over a thousand hostages.
- 1978 – The District of Columbia Voting Rights Amendment is passed by the U.S. Congress, although it is never ratified by a sufficient number of states.
- 1981 – Far Eastern Air Transport Flight 103 disintegrates in mid-air and crashes in Sanyi Township, Miaoli County, Taiwan. All 110 people on board are killed.
- 1985 – British Airtours Flight 28M suffers an engine fire during takeoff at Manchester Airport. The pilots abort but due to inefficient evacuation procedures 55 people are killed, mostly from smoke inhalation.
- 1989 – Nolan Ryan strikes out Rickey Henderson to become the first Major League Baseball pitcher to record 5,000 strikeouts.
- 1991 – Iceland is the first nation in the world to recognize the independence of the Baltic states.
- 1992 – FBI sniper Lon Horiuchi shoots and kills Vicki Weaver during an 11-day siege at her home at Ruby Ridge, Idaho.
- 1999 – China Airlines Flight 642 crashes at Hong Kong International Airport, killing three people and injuring 208 more.
- 2003 – Chief Justice of the Supreme Court of Alabama Roy Moore is suspended after refusing to comply with a federal court order to remove a rock inscribed with the Ten Commandments from the lobby of the Alabama Supreme Court building.
- 2004 – Versions of The Scream and Madonna, two paintings by Edvard Munch, are stolen at gunpoint from a museum in Oslo, Norway.
- 2006 – Pulkovo Aviation Enterprise Flight 612 crashes near the Russian border over eastern Ukraine, killing all 170 people on board.
- 2006 – Grigori Perelman is awarded the Fields Medal for his proof of the Poincaré conjecture in mathematics but refuses to accept the medal.
- 2007 – The Texas Rangers defeat the Baltimore Orioles 30–3, the most runs scored by a team in modern Major League Baseball history.
- 2012 – Ethnic clashes over grazing rights for cattle in Kenya's Tana River District result in more than 52 deaths.

== Births ==
=== Pre-1600 ===
- 1412 – Frederick II, Elector of Saxony (died 1464)
- 1570 – Franz von Dietrichstein, Roman Catholic archbishop and cardinal (died 1636)
- 1599 – Agatha Marie of Hanau, German noblewoman (died 1636)

=== 1601–1900 ===
- 1601 – Georges de Scudéry, French author, poet, and playwright (died 1667)
- 1624 – Jean Regnault de Segrais, French author and poet (died 1701)
- 1647 – Denis Papin, French physicist and mathematician, developed pressure cooking (died 1712)
- 1679 – Pierre Guérin de Tencin, French cardinal (died 1758)
- 1760 – Pope Leo XII (died 1829)
- 1764 – Charles Percier, French architect and interior designer (died 1838)
- 1771 – Henry Maudslay, English engineer (died 1831)
- 1773 – Aimé Bonpland, French botanist and explorer (died 1858)
- 1778 – James Kirke Paulding, American poet, playwright, and politician, 11th United States Secretary of the Navy (died 1860)
- 1800 – Samuel David Luzzatto, Italian poet and scholar (died 1865)
- 1818 – Rudolf von Jhering, German jurist (died 1892)
- 1827 – Ezra Butler Eddy, Canadian businessman and politician (died 1906)
- 1834 – Samuel Pierpont Langley, American physicist and astronomer (died 1906)
- 1836 – Archibald Willard, American soldier and painter (died 1918)
- 1844 – George W. De Long, American Naval officer and explorer (died 1881)
- 1845 – William Lewis Douglas, American businessman and politician, 42nd Governor of Massachusetts (died 1924)
- 1847 – John Forrest, Australian politician, 1st Premier of Western Australia (died 1918)
- 1848 – Melville Elijah Stone, American publisher, founded the Chicago Daily News (died 1929)
- 1854 – Milan I of Serbia (died 1901)
- 1857 – Ned Hanlon, American baseball player and manager (died 1937)
- 1860 – Paul Gottlieb Nipkow, Polish-German technician and inventor, created the Nipkow disk (died 1940)
- 1860 – Alfred Ploetz, German physician, biologist, and eugenicist (died 1940)
- 1862 – Claude Debussy, French pianist and composer (died 1918)
- 1867 – Maximilian Bircher-Benner, Swiss physician and nutritionist (died 1939)
- 1867 – Charles Francis Jenkins, American inventor (died 1934)
- 1868 – Willis R. Whitney, American chemist (died 1958)
- 1873 – Alexander Bogdanov, Russian physician and philosopher (died 1928)
- 1874 – Max Scheler, German philosopher and author (died 1928)
- 1880 – Gorch Fock, German author and poet (died 1916)
- 1880 – George Herriman, American cartoonist (died 1944)
- 1881 – Bede Jarrett, English Dominican priest (died 1934)
- 1881 – James Newland, Australian soldier and policeman (died 1949)
- 1882 – Raymonde de Laroche, French pilot (died 1919)
- 1887 – Lutz Graf Schwerin von Krosigk, German jurist and politician, German Minister of Foreign Affairs (died 1977)
- 1890 – Cecil Kellaway, South African actor (died 1973)
- 1891 – Henry Bachtold, Australian soldier and railway engineer (died 1983)
- 1891 – Jacques Lipchitz, Lithuanian-Italian sculptor (died 1973)
- 1893 – Wilfred Kitching, English 7th General of The Salvation Army (died 1977)
- 1893 – Dorothy Parker, American poet, short story writer, critic, and satirist (died 1967)
- 1893 – Ernest H. Volwiler, American chemist (died 1992)
- 1895 – László Almásy, Hungarian captain, pilot, and explorer (died 1951)
- 1895 – Paul Comtois, Canadian lawyer and politician, 21st Lieutenant Governor of Quebec (died 1966)
- 1896 – Laurence McKinley Gould, American geologist, educator, and polar explorer (died 1995)
- 1897 – Bill Woodfull, Australian cricketer and educator (died 1965)
- 1900 – Lisy Fischer, Swiss-born pianist and child prodigy (died 1999)

=== 1901–present ===
- 1902 – Thomas Pelly, American lawyer and politician (died 1973)
- 1902 – Leni Riefenstahl, German actress, film director and propagandist (died 2003)
- 1902 – Edward Rowe Snow, American historian and author (died 1982)
- 1903 – Jerry Iger, American cartoonist, co-founded Eisner & Iger (died 1990)
- 1904 – Deng Xiaoping, Chinese soldier and politician, paramount leader and 1st Vice Premier of the People's Republic of China (died 1997)
- 1908 – Henri Cartier-Bresson, French photographer and painter (died 2004)
- 1908 – Erwin Thiesies, German rugby player and coach (died 1993)
- 1909 – Julius J. Epstein, American screenwriter and producer (died 2000)
- 1909 – Mel Hein, American football player and coach (died 1992)
- 1913 – Leonard Pagliero, English businessman and pilot (died 2008)
- 1913 – Bruno Pontecorvo, Italian physicist and academic (died 1993)
- 1914 – Jack Dunphy, American author and playwright (died 1992)
- 1914 – Connie B. Gay, American businessman, co-founded the Country Music Hall of Fame and Museum (died 1989)
- 1915 – David Dellinger, American activist (died 2004)
- 1915 – James Hillier, Canadian-American scientist, co-designed the electron microscope (died 2007)
- 1915 – Edward Szczepanik, Polish economist and politician, 15th Prime Minister of the Polish Republic in Exile (died 2005)
- 1917 – John Lee Hooker, American singer-songwriter and guitarist (died 2001)
- 1918 – Mary McGrory, American journalist and author (died 2004)
- 1920 – Ray Bradbury, American science fiction writer and screenwriter (died 2012)
- 1920 – Denton Cooley, American surgeon and scientist (died 2016)
- 1921 – Dinos Dimopoulos, Greek director and screenwriter (died 2003)
- 1921 – Tony Pawson, English cricketer, footballer, and journalist (died 2012)
- 1922 – Roberto Aizenberg, Argentine painter and sculptor (died 1996)
- 1922 – Theoni V. Aldredge, Greek-American costume designer (died 2011)
- 1922 – Frank Kelly Freas, American science fiction and fantasy artist (died 2005)
- 1924 – James Kirkwood, Jr., American playwright and author (died 1989)
- 1924 – Harishankar Parsai, Indian writer, satirist and humorist (died 1995)
- 1925 – Honor Blackman, English actress and republican (died 2020)
- 1926 – Marc Bohan, French fashion designer (died 2023)
- 1926 – Bob Flanigan, American pop singer (died 2011)
- 1928 – Tinga Seisay, Sierra Leonean academic and diplomat (died 2015)
- 1928 – Karlheinz Stockhausen, German composer and academic (died 2007)
- 1929 – Valery Alekseyev, Russian anthropologist and author (died 1991)
- 1929 – Roy Clay, American computer scientist (died 2024)
- 1929 – Ulrich Wegener, German police officer and general (died 2017)
- 1930 – Gylmar dos Santos Neves, Brazilian footballer (died 2013)
- 1932 – Gerald P. Carr, American engineer, colonel, and astronaut (died 2020)
- 1933 – Sylva Koscina, Italian actress (died 1994)
- 1934 – Norman Schwarzkopf, Jr., American general and engineer (died 2012)
- 1935 – Annie Proulx, American novelist, short story writer, and journalist
- 1936 – Chuck Brown, American singer-songwriter, guitarist, and producer (died 2012)
- 1936 – John Callaway, American journalist and producer (died 2009)
- 1936 – Dale Hawkins, American singer-songwriter and guitarist (died 2010)
- 1936 – Werner Stengel, German roller coaster designer and engineer, designed the Maverick roller coaster
- 1938 – Jean Berkey, American businesswoman and politician (died 2013)
- 1939 – Valerie Harper, American actress (died 2019)
- 1939 – Carl Yastrzemski, American baseball player
- 1940 – Bill McCartney, American football player and coach (died 2025)
- 1941 – Thomas Lovejoy, American conservation biologist who coined the term "biodiversity"
- 1941 – Bill Parcells, American football player and coach
- 1943 – Alun Michael, Welsh police commissioner and politician, inaugural First Minister of Wales
- 1943 – Masatoshi Shima, Japanese computer scientist and engineer, co-designed the Intel 4004
- 1944 – Roger Cashmore, English physicist and academic
- 1945 – David Chase, American screenwriter and producer
- 1945 – Ron Dante, American singer-songwriter and producer
- 1947 – Donna Godchaux, American singer (Grateful Dead and Elvis Presley)
- 1947 – Cindy Williams, American actress and producer (died 2023)
- 1948 – David Marks, American singer-songwriter and guitarist
- 1948 – Carolyn L. Mazloomi, American art historian and quilter
- 1949 – Joop Donkervoort, Dutch businessman
- 1949 – Diana Nyad, American swimmer and author
- 1950 – Ray Burris, American baseball player and coach
- 1950 – Scooter Libby, American lawyer and politician, Chief of Staff to the Vice President of the United States
- 1952 – Peter Laughner, American singer-songwriter and guitarist (died 1977)
- 1953 – Paul Ellering, American weightlifter, wrestler, and manager
- 1955 – Chiranjeevi, Indian film actor, producer and politician
- 1956 – Paul Molitor, American baseball player and coach
- 1956 – Peter Taylor, Australian cricketer
- 1957 – Steve Davis, English snooker player, sportscaster, and author
- 1957 – Holly Dunn, American country music singer-songwriter (died 2016)
- 1958 – Colm Feore, American-Canadian actor
- 1958 – Stevie Ray, American wrestler
- 1958 – Vernon Reid, English-born American guitarist and songwriter
- 1959 – Juan Croucier, Cuban-American singer-songwriter, bass player, and producer
- 1959 – Pia Gjellerup, Danish lawyer and politician, Danish Minister of Finance
- 1959 – Mark Williams, English actor
- 1960 – Holger Gehrke, German footballer and manager
- 1960 – Collin Raye, American country music singer
- 1960 – Regina Taylor, American actress and playwright
- 1961 – Andrés Calamaro, Argentine singer-songwriter, guitarist, and producer
- 1961 – Roland Orzabal, English singer and musician
- 1962 – Stefano Tilli, Italian sprinter
- 1963 – Tori Amos, American singer-songwriter, pianist, and producer
- 1963 – James DeBarge, American R&B/soul singer
- 1964 – Mats Wilander, Swedish-American tennis player and coach
- 1965 – Wendy Botha, South African-Australian surfer
- 1965 – David Reimer, Canadian man, born male but reassigned female and raised as a girl after a botched circumcision (died 2004)
- 1966 – GZA, American rapper and producer
- 1966 – Rob Witschge, Dutch footballer and manager
- 1967 – Adewale Akinnuoye-Agbaje, English actor
- 1967 – Ty Burrell, American actor and comedian
- 1967 – Paul Colman, Australian singer-songwriter and guitarist
- 1967 – Layne Staley, American singer-songwriter (died 2002)
- 1968 – Casper Christensen, Danish comedian, actor, and screenwriter
- 1968 – Aleksandr Mostovoi, Russian footballer
- 1968 – Elisabeth Murdoch, Australian businesswoman
- 1968 – Horst Skoff, Austrian tennis player (died 2008)
- 1970 – Charlie Connelly, English author and broadcaster
- 1970 – Giada De Laurentiis, Italian-American chef and author
- 1970 – Tímea Nagy, Hungarian fencer
- 1971 – Richard Armitage, English actor
- 1971 – Craig Finn, American singer-songwriter and guitarist
- 1971 – Rick Yune, American actor
- 1972 – Okkert Brits, South African pole vaulter
- 1972 – Paul Doucette, American singer-songwriter, guitarist, and drummer
- 1972 – Max Wilson, German-Brazilian race car driver
- 1973 – Roslina Bakar, Malaysian sport shooter
- 1973 – Howie Dorough, American singer-songwriter and dancer
- 1973 – Kristen Wiig, American actress, comedian, and screenwriter
- 1973 – Eurelijus Žukauskas, Lithuanian basketball player
- 1974 – Cory Gardner, American politician
- 1974 – Jenna Leigh Green, American actress and singer
- 1974 – Agustín Pichot, Argentinian rugby player
- 1975 – Clint Bolton, Australian footballer
- 1975 – Rodrigo Santoro, Brazilian actor
- 1976 – Marius Bezykornovas, Lithuanian footballer
- 1976 – Bryn Davies, American bassist, cellist, and pianist
- 1976 – Laurent Hernu, French decathlete
- 1976 – Jeff Weaver, American baseball player
- 1976 – Randy Wolf, American baseball player
- 1977 – Heiðar Helguson, Icelandic footballer
- 1977 – Keren Cytter, Israeli visual artist and writer
- 1978 – James Corden, English actor, comedian, writer, and television presenter
- 1978 – Ioannis Gagaloudis, Greek basketball player
- 1979 – Brandon Adams, American actor
- 1979 – Steve Kornacki, American political journalist, writer and TV presenter (NBC)
- 1979 – Matt Walters, American football player
- 1980 – Roland Benschneider, German footballer
- 1980 – Nicolas Macrozonaris, Canadian sprinter
- 1980 – Seiko Yamamoto, Japanese wrestler
- 1981 – Alex Holmes, American football player
- 1981 – Jang Hyun-kyu, South Korean footballer (died 2012)
- 1981 – Christina Obergföll, German javelin athlete
- 1982 – Sean Rash, American bowler
- 1983 – Theo Bos, Dutch cyclist
- 1983 – Jahri Evans, American football player
- 1984 – Lee Camp, English footballer
- 1984 – Lawrence Quaye, Ghanaian-Qatari footballer
- 1985 – Luke Russert, American journalist
- 1985 – Jey Uso, Samoan-American wrestler
- 1985 – Jimmy Uso, Samoan-American wrestler
- 1985 – Salih Yoluç, Turkish race car driver
- 1986 – Stephen Ireland, Irish footballer
- 1986 – Tokushōryū Makoto, Japanese sumo wrestler
- 1987 – Apollo Crews, American wrestler
- 1989 – Giacomo Bonaventura, Italian footballer
- 1989 – Aleksandra Gajewska, Polish politician and businessperson
- 1990 – Randall Cobb, American football player
- 1990 – Drew Hutchison, American baseball player
- 1990 – Robbie Rochow, Australian rugby league player
- 1990 – Adam Thielen, American football player
- 1991 – Federico Macheda, Italian footballer
- 1991 – Brayden Schenn, Canadian ice hockey player
- 1992 – Ema Burgić Bucko, Bosnian tennis player
- 1993 – Laura Dahlmeier, German biathlete (died 2025)
- 1993 – Dillon Danis, American mixed martial artist
- 1994 – Israel Broussard, American actor
- 1994 – Olli Määttä, Finnish ice hockey player
- 1995 – Dua Lipa, English singer-songwriter
- 1996 – Jessica-Jane Applegate, British Paralympic swimmer
- 1996 – Jeon So-min, South Korean singer-songwriter
- 1997 – Maxx Crosby, American football player
- 1997 – Fanum, American streamer
- 1997 – Lautaro Martínez, Argentine footballer
- 2001 – LaMelo Ball, American basketball player
- 2003 – Cooper Connolly, Australian cricketer
- 2005 – Stiliana Nikolova, Bulgarian rhythmic gymnast

== Deaths ==
=== Pre-1600 ===
- 408 – Stilicho, Roman general (born 359)
- 1155 – Emperor Konoe of Japan (born 1139)
- 1241 – Pope Gregory IX, (born 1143)
- 1280 – Pope Nicholas III (born 1225)
- 1304 – John II, Count of Holland (born 1247)
- 1338 – William II, Duke of Athens (born 1312)
- 1350 – Philip VI of France (born 1293)
- 1358 – Isabella of France, Queen Consort of England (born 1295)
- 1425 – Eleanor, Princess of Asturias (born 1423)
- 1456 – Vladislav II of Wallachia
- 1485 – Richard III of England (born 1452)
- 1485 – James Harrington, Yorkist knight
- 1485 – John Howard, 1st Duke of Norfolk (born 1430)
- 1485 – Richard Ratcliffe, supporter of Richard III
- 1485 – William Brandon, supporter of Henry VII (born 1426)
- 1532 – William Warham, Archbishop of Canterbury (born 1450)
- 1545 – Charles Brandon, 1st Duke of Suffolk, English politician and husband of Mary Tudor (born c. 1484)
- 1553 – John Dudley, 1st Duke of Northumberland, English admiral and politician, Lord President of the Council (born 1504)
- 1572 – Thomas Percy, 7th Earl of Northumberland, English leader of the Rising of the North (born 1528)
- 1584 – Jan Kochanowski, Polish poet and playwright (born 1530)
- 1599 – Luca Marenzio, Italian singer-songwriter (born 1553)

=== 1601–1900 ===
- 1607 – Bartholomew Gosnold, English lawyer and explorer, founded the London Company (born 1572)
- 1652 – Jacob De la Gardie, Estonian-Swedish soldier and politician, Lord High Constable of Sweden (born 1583)
- 1664 – Maria Cunitz, Polish astronomer and author (born 1610)
- 1680 – John George II, Elector of Saxony (born 1613)
- 1681 – Philippe Delano, Dutch Plymouth Colony settler (born 1602)
- 1701 – John Granville, 1st Earl of Bath, English soldier and politician, Lord Lieutenant of Ireland (born 1628)
- 1711 – Louis François, duc de Boufflers, French general (born 1644)
- 1752 – William Whiston, English mathematician, historian, and theologian (born 1667)
- 1773 – George Lyttelton, 1st Baron Lyttelton, English poet and politician, Chancellor of the Exchequer (born 1709)
- 1793 – Louis de Noailles, French general (born 1713)
- 1797 – Dagobert Sigmund von Wurmser, French-Austrian field marshal (born 1724)
- 1806 – Jean-Honoré Fragonard, French painter and illustrator (born 1732)
- 1818 – Warren Hastings, English lawyer and politician, 1st Governor-General of Bengal (born 1732)
- 1828 – Franz Joseph Gall, Austrian neuroanatomist and physiologist (born 1758)
- 1850 – Nikolaus Lenau, Romanian-Austrian poet and author (born 1802)
- 1861 – Xianfeng, Emperor of China (born 1831)
- 1888 – Ágoston Trefort, Hungarian jurist and politician, Hungarian Minister of Education (born 1817)
- 1891 – Jan Neruda, Czech journalist, author, and poet (born 1834)

=== 1901–present ===
- 1903 – Robert Gascoyne-Cecil, 3rd Marquess of Salisbury, English academic and politician, Prime Minister of the United Kingdom (born 1830)
- 1904 – Kate Chopin, American novelist and poet (born 1850)
- 1909 – Henry Radcliffe Crocker, English dermatologist and author (born 1846)
- 1914 – Giacomo Radini-Tedeschi, Italian bishop and academic (born 1859)
- 1918 – Korbinian Brodmann, German neurologist and academic (born 1868)
- 1920 – Anders Zorn, Swedish artist (born 1860)
- 1922 – Michael Collins, Irish rebel, counter-intelligence and military tactician, and politician; 2nd Irish Minister of Finance (born 1890)
- 1926 – Charles William Eliot, American academic (born 1834)
- 1933 – Alexandros Kontoulis, Greek general and diplomat (born 1858)
- 1937 – Pedro Durruti, Spanish anarchist and Falangist revolutionary (born 1911)
- 1940 – Oliver Lodge, English physicist and academic (born 1851)
- 1940 – Gerald Strickland, 1st Baron Strickland, Maltese lawyer and politician, 4th Prime Minister of Malta (born 1861)
- 1942 – Michel Fokine, Russian dancer and choreographer (born 1880)
- 1946 – Döme Sztójay, Hungarian general and politician, 35th Prime Minister of Hungary (born 1883)
- 1950 – Kirk Bryan, American geologist and academic (born 1888)
- 1951 – Jack Bickell, Canadian businessman and philanthropist (born 1884)
- 1953 – Jim Tabor, American baseball player (born 1916)
- 1958 – Roger Martin du Gard, French novelist and paleographer, Nobel Prize laureate (born 1881)
- 1960 – Johannes Sikkar, Estonian soldier and politician, Prime Minister of Estonia in exile (born 1897)
- 1963 – William Morris, 1st Viscount Nuffield, English businessman and philanthropist, founded Morris Motors (born 1877)
- 1966 – Erwin Komenda, Austrian car designer and engineer (born 1904)
- 1967 – Gregory Goodwin Pincus, American biologist and academic, co-created the birth-control pill (born 1903)
- 1970 – Vladimir Propp, Russian philologist and scholar (born 1895)
- 1971 – Birger Nerman, Swedish archaeologist (born 1888)
- 1974 – Jacob Bronowski, Polish-English mathematician, biologist, and author (born 1908)
- 1976 – Gina Bachauer, Greek pianist and composer (born 1913)
- 1976 – Juscelino Kubitschek, Brazilian physician and politician, 21st President of Brazil (born 1902)
- 1977 – Sebastian Cabot, English actor (born 1918)
- 1977 – Chunseong, Korean monk, philosopher and writer (born 1891)
- 1977 – Rex Connor, Australian politician (born 1907)
- 1978 – Jomo Kenyatta, Kenyan politician, 1st President of Kenya (born 1894)
- 1979 – James T. Farrell, American novelist, short-story writer, and poet (born 1904)
- 1980 – James Smith McDonnell, American pilot, engineer, and businessman, founded McDonnell Aircraft (born 1899)
- 1981 – Vicente Manansala, Filipino painter (born 1910)
- 1985 – Charles Gibson, historian of Mexico and its Indians, president of the American Historical Association (born 1920)
- 1986 – Celâl Bayar, Turkish lawyer and politician, 3rd President of Turkey (born 1883)
- 1987 – Joseph P. Lash, American author and journalist (born 1909)
- 1989 – Robert Grondelaers, Belgian cyclist (born 1933)
- 1989 – Huey P. Newton, American activist, co-founded the Black Panther Party (born 1942)
- 1991 – Colleen Dewhurst, Canadian-American actress (born 1924)
- 1991 – Boris Pugo, Russian soldier and politician, Soviet Minister of Interior (born 1937)
- 1994 – Gilles Groulx, Canadian director and screenwriter (born 1931)
- 1994 – Allan Houser, American sculptor and painter (born 1914)
- 1995 – Johnny Carey, Irish footballer and manager (born 1919)
- 2000 – Abulfaz Elchibey, 2nd President of Azerbaijan (born 1938)
- 2003 – Arnold Gerschwiler, Swiss figure skater and coach (born 1914)
- 2004 – Konstantin Aseev, Russian chess player and trainer (born 1960)
- 2004 – Angus Bethune, Australian soldier and politician, 33rd Premier of Tasmania (born 1908)
- 2004 – Daniel Petrie, Canadian director and producer (born 1920)
- 2005 – Luc Ferrari, French-Italian director and composer (born 1929)
- 2005 – Ernest Kirkendall, American chemist and metallurgist (born 1914)
- 2007 – Grace Paley, American short story writer and poet (born 1922)
- 2008 – Gladys Powers, English-Canadian soldier (born 1899)
- 2009 – Muriel Duckworth, Canadian pacifist, feminist, and activist (born 1908)
- 2009 – Elmer Kelton, American journalist and author (born 1926)
- 2010 – Stjepan Bobek, Croatian footballer and manager (born 1923)
- 2011 – Nick Ashford, American singer-songwriter and producer (born 1942)
- 2011 – Jack Layton, Canadian academic and politician (born 1950)
- 2011 – Casey Ribicoff, American philanthropist (born 1922)
- 2011 – Yao Yuanjun, Chinese border police officer (born 1993)
- 2012 – Nina Bawden, English author (born 1925)
- 2012 – Paul Shan Kuo-hsi, Taiwanese cardinal (born 1923)
- 2012 – Jeffrey Stone, American actor and screenwriter (born 1926)
- 2013 – Paul Poberezny, American pilot and businessman, founded the Experimental Aircraft Association (born 1921)
- 2014 – U. R. Ananthamurthy, Indian author, poet, and playwright (born 1932)
- 2014 – Emmanuel Kriaras, Greek lexicographer and philologist (born 1906)
- 2014 – Pete Ladygo, American football player and coach (born 1928)
- 2014 – Noella Leduc, American baseball player (born 1933)
- 2014 – John Sperling, American businessman, founded the University of Phoenix (born 1921)
- 2014 – John S. Waugh, American chemist and academic (born 1929)
- 2015 – Arthur Morris, Australian cricketer and journalist (born 1922)
- 2015 – Ieng Thirith, Cambodian academic and politician (born 1932)
- 2015 – Eric Thompson, English race car driver and book dealer (born 1919)
- 2016 – S. R. Nathan, 6th President of Singapore (born 1924)
- 2016 – Toots Thielemans, Belgian and American jazz musician (born 1922)
- 2017 – Michael J. C. Gordon, British Computer scientist (born 1948)
- 2018 – Ed King, American musician (born 1949)
- 2018 – Krishna Reddy, Indian printmaker, sculptor and teacher (born 1925)
- 2021 – Rod Gilbert, Canadian ice hockey player (born 1941)
- 2023 – Toto Cutugno, Italian singer-songwriter (born 1943)
- 2023 – Alexandra Paul, Canadian ice dancer (born 1991)
- 2024 – Arthur J. Gregg, American military officer (born 1928)
- 2026 – Shelley Fabares, American actress and singer (born 1944)
- 2026 – Siim Kallas, Estonian politician, Prime Minister of Estonia (born 1948)

== Holidays and observances ==
- Christian feast day:
  - Immaculate Heart of Mary (Roman Catholic calendar of 1960)
  - John Kemble
  - Queenship of Mary
  - Blessed Symeon Lukach
  - August 22 (Eastern Orthodox liturgics)
- International Day Commemorating the Victims of Acts of Violence Based on Religion or Belief
- Earliest day on which National Heroes' Day (Philippines) can fall, while August 28 is the latest; celebrated on the fourth Monday in August.
- Flag Day (Russia)
- Madras Day (Chennai and Tamil Nadu, India)
