= Portas do Cerco =

Building in Macau, China

Coordinates: 22.2147°N 113.5488°E

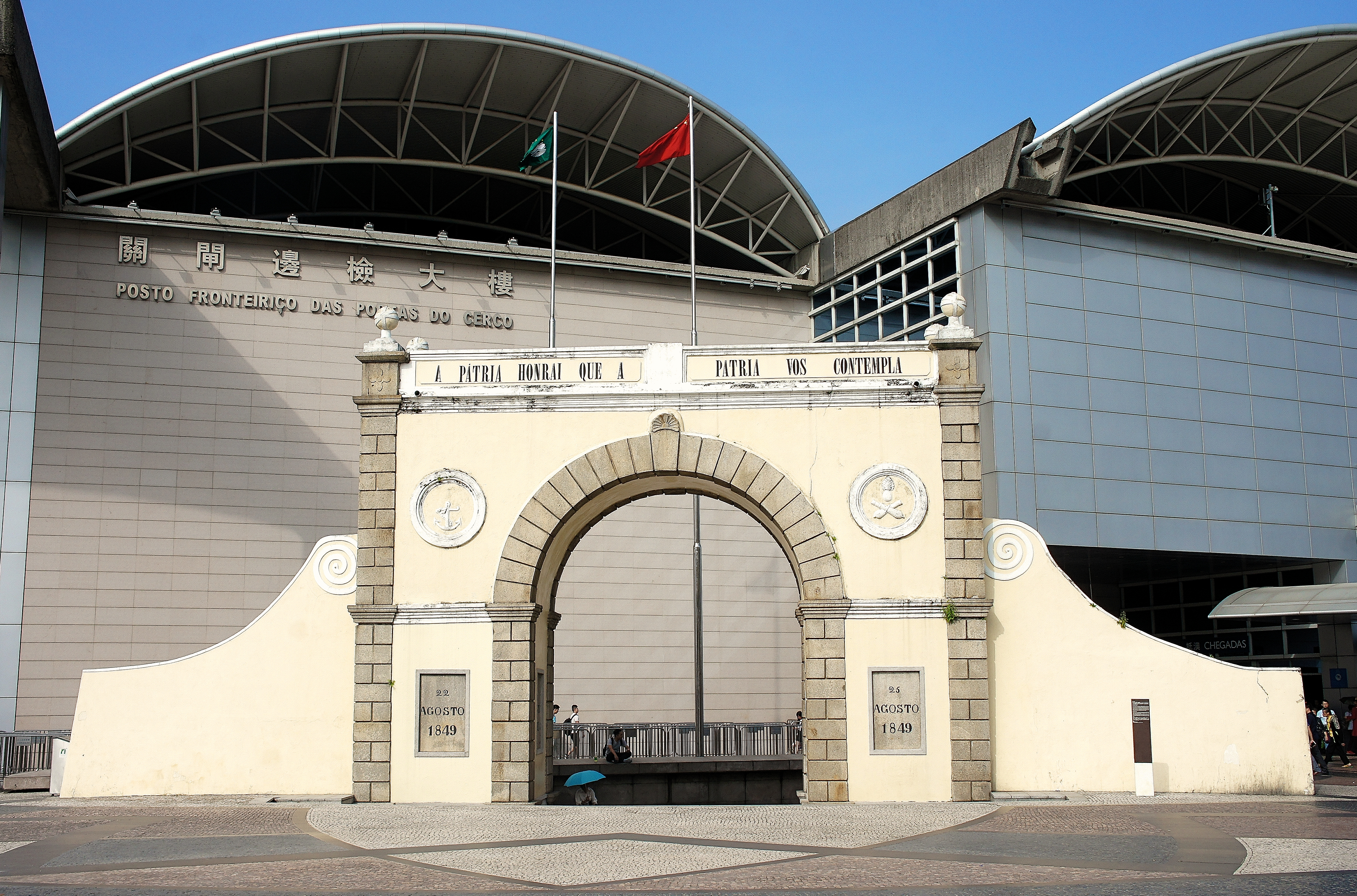
- The Portas do Cerco in 2016

Chinese name
- Traditional Chinese: 關閘
- Simplified Chinese: 关闸
- Literal meaning: siege gate
Transcriptions
Standard Mandarin
- Hanyu Pinyin: Guānzhá
- Wade–Giles: Kuan^{1}-cha^{2}
Yue: Cantonese
- Jyutping: gwaan^{1} zaap^{6}

Portuguese name
- Portuguese: Portas do Cerco

The Portas do Cerco is an area in Nossa Senhora de Fátima, Macau, China. Located on the northern tip of the Macau Peninsula, it is known by the Barrier Gate separating Macau from mainland China. The Portuguese built the gate in 1849 to replace a crumbling wall that the Chinese erected during the Ming dynasty in 1573. The Chinese built a garrisoned wall to control the flow of people and goods. It was the site of the Passaleão incident, a clash between the Qing dynasty and the Kingdom of Portugal in 1849 over the death of Macau's governor Ferreira do Amaral. Led by Colonel Mesquita, Portugal won the small battle which led to the extension of Macau's border northwards. At the limit of said expansion, the Portas do Cerco was built with the inscription "A pátria honrai, que a pátria vos contempla" (Portuguese for "Honor your fatherland, for your fatherland looks over you") on the façade on its inner arch in 1849. The Barrier Gate served as a de facto boundary, but the precise limits of Macau's border has never been formally demarcated.

Macau, now a special administrative region of China, still has an official border with Zhuhai in mainland China a few meters behind the old barrier gate. The new Posto Fronteiriço das Portas do Cerco (Barrier Gate Border Post) was opened on 15 January 2004.

== History ==
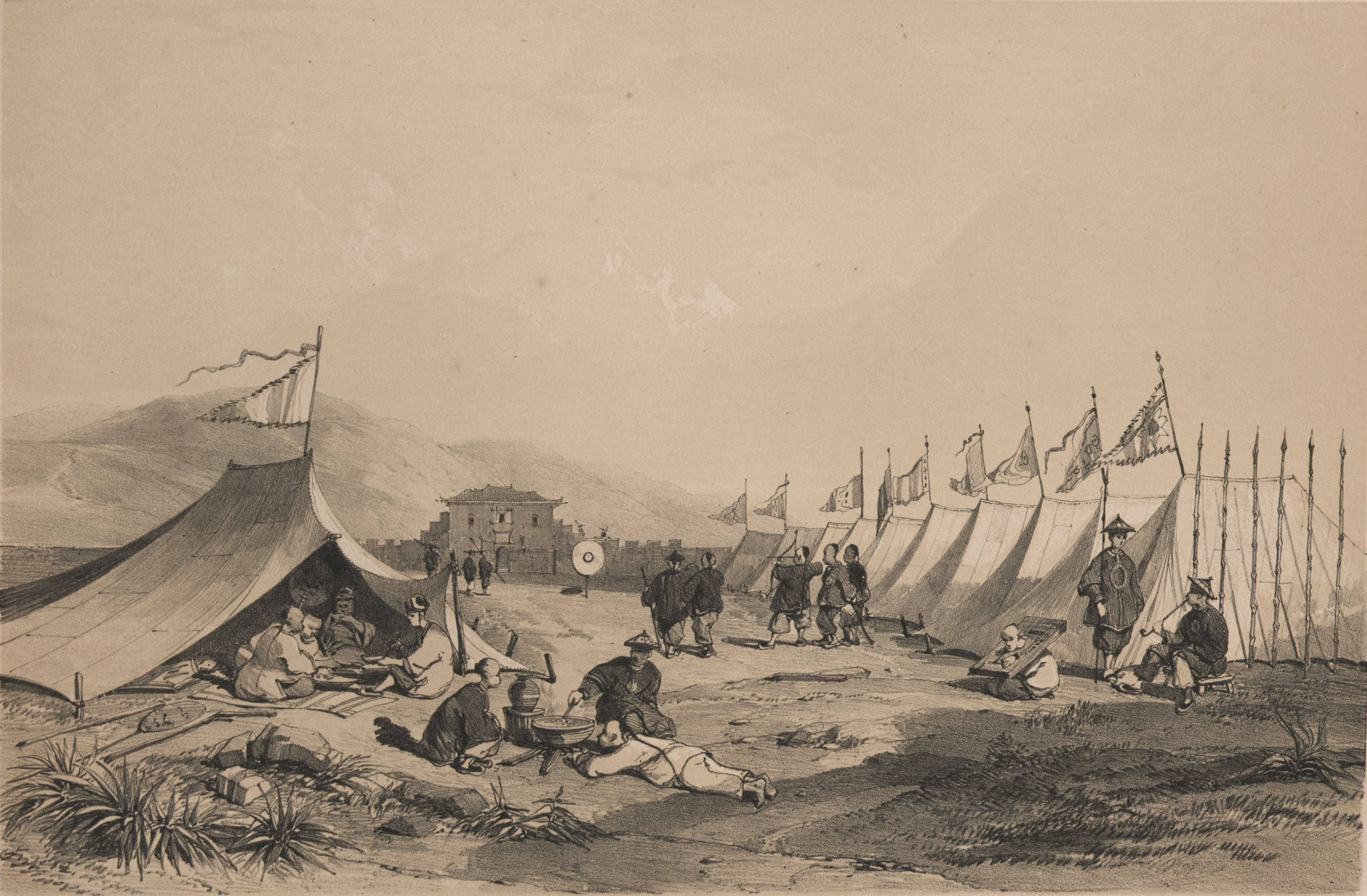
Chinese encampment outside the first Barrier Gate on Zhongshan Island, by Auguste Borget (published 1842)

The first formalised border crossing was built in 1573, which was subsequently repaired and rebuilt several times until the present border gate was erected in 1870. It was the site of the Battle of the Barrier between British and Chinese forces on 19 August 1840.

During the 1950s and 1960s the Portas do Cerco was also referred to as Far Eastern Checkpoint Charlie with a major border incident happening in 1952 with Portuguese African Troops exchanging fire with Chinese Communist border guards. According to reports, the exchange lasted for one and three quarter hours leaving one dead and several dozens injured on Macau side and more than 100 casualties claimed on the Communist Chinese side.

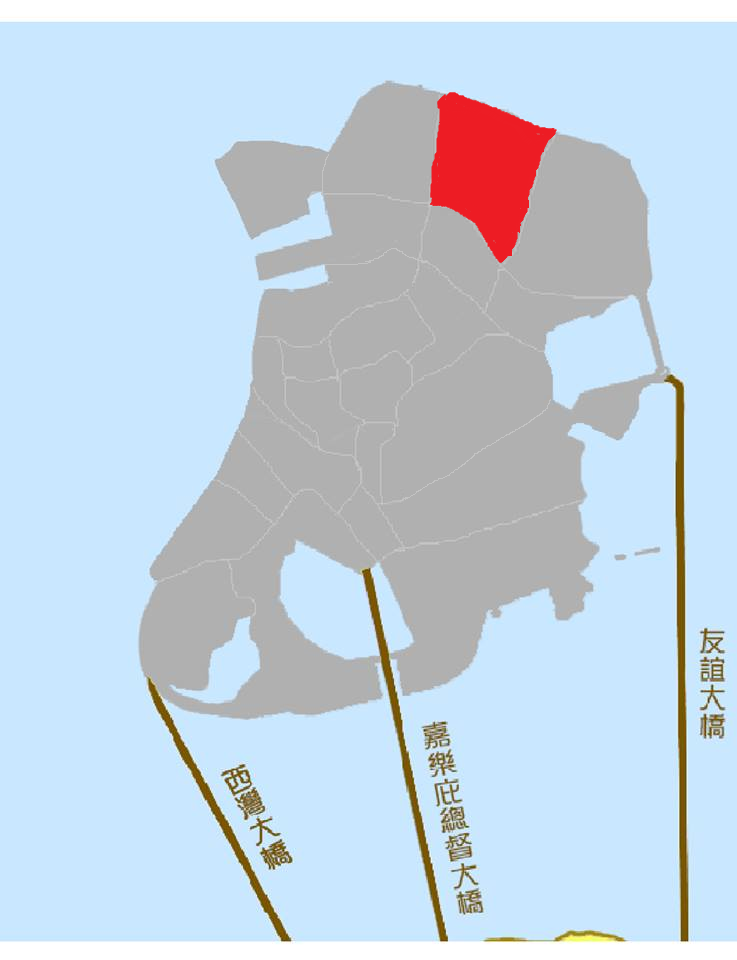
The Portas do Cerco neighbourhood on the Macau Peninsula.

== See also ==
- List of tourist attractions in Macau
