= Francisco Xavier da Cunha Aragão =

Portuguese military officer

- Born: 15 March 1891; Nova Goa, Portuguese India
- Died: 22 August 1973; Lisbon
- Military career
- Allegiance: Portugal
- Branch: Portuguese Army
- Rank: Lieutenant Colonel
- Unit: Cavalry

Francisco Xavier da Cunha Aragão (15 March 1891 – 26 February 1973) was a Cavalry officer of the Portuguese Army who reached the rank of lieutenant colonel.

After World War I, Aragão moved to Military Aeronautics, having been a pioneers of military aviation in Portugal. From 1923 to 1924, he was chief of staff to António Ribeiro de Carvalho. Aragão conspired against the Estado Novo from 1931 onwards; he was dismissed from the armed forces and forced into exile in France. He returned to Portugal in 1940 and settling in the Azores.

== Early life ==
Francisco Xavier da Cunha Aragão was born in Panaji (Nova Goa), then a part of Portuguese India. He was the son of Militão Constantino Aragão, an officer in the Portuguese Navy, and his wife Ana Henriqueta da Cunha Aragão. Francisco's father was born in Povoação, Azores, and rose to the rank of vice admiral by the end of his naval career. At the time of Francisco's birth, he was a field assistant to his wife's father Governor-General Francisco Maria da Cunha, a fellow Azorean from Angra do Heroísmo. Francisco Xavier da Cunha Aragão married Georgina Pereira de Vasconcelos, also a native of Angra do Heroísmo, on 19 May 1919.

Francisco was the brother of Commodore António da Cunha Aragão of the Portuguese Navy, who became famous in India.

== Military career ==
Francisco Aragão served on the southern border of Angola, where an incident that became known in Portuguese historiography as the "Naulila disaster" and in German historiography as the "Naulila murder" (German: Mord von Naulila), occurred. On 18 October 1914, a platoon commanded by Lieutenant Manuel Álvares Sereno, who was patrolling the border with Damaraland, encountered a small German force about 12 km (7.5 miles)from the Naulila post. It was commanded by Dr. Hans Schultze-Jena, judge and administrator of Outjo district, who had entered Angola without informing the Portuguese authorities and without contact with any border post. Sereno had orders to disarm German forces; he led part of the German group back to Naulila the next morning. A sudden confrontation followed, leading to the death of two native orderlies, Dr. Schultze-Jena and the two German officers who accompanied him.

German settlers met the deaths with indignation and quickly organized punitive expeditions against Portuguese posts along the border. The Cuangar post on the banks of the Cubango River was attacked, as were several other border posts in the region. As a result, the 47-strong detachment of dragoons commanded by Francisco Aragão was integrated into the forces commanded by Alves Roçadas. The combined unit included metropolitan troops of the Portuguese expeditionary force that the previous month had landed in Moçâmedes, colonial troops from Angola and a corps of Mozambicans known as "landin troops".

Aragão's detachment was the first to engage with the punitive expedition sent to Naulila by the German Southwest African government. After some clashes, intense surveillance and follow-up work, Aragão took part in a battle fought at Naulila on 19 December 1914. He distinguished himself by defending his position as long as he could, fighting to exhaustion at the front of the dragons. He was taken prisoner by the Germans and presumed dead but was released in 1915 when South African troops took possession of German Southwest Africa. Aragão was sent to Cape Town, from where he embarked for Portugal, stopping at ports in Angola, Cape Verde and Madeira.

During his stopover in Funchal, Aragão made statements to the press in which he repudiated the Pimenta de Castro dictatorship and urged Portugal to enter the First World War to avenge the German outrage. His statements in Madeira were reported in the Lisbon press, provoking a backlash from pacifist circles and those aligned with Germany. Among the most-violent reactions was that of Fernando Pessoa, who criticized Aragão's the position. In a text titled "Letter to a Stupid Hero", Pessoa addresses Francisco Aragão as "Your Heroicity".

Francisco Aragão was received in Lisbon as the Hero of Naulila and received many honours. He was one of the most effective defenders of Portugal's participation in the First World War, becoming a symbol for republicans and democrats who supported entering the war. In a public session held at the Coliseu dos Recreios, he received a sword engraved with the caption; "To Lieutenant of Cavalry Francisco Xavier da Cunha Aragão, Commander of the 1st Dragon Squadron—Planalto da Huíla. Homage of admiration for brilliant service in the defence zone of Eval and in the combat of Naulila on 18.12.1914".

=== Deportation to the Azores ===
After a period of imprisonment, Aragão was released and sent to Angra do Heroísmo. He was married to Georgina Pereira de Vasconcelos, heir of the industrialist Frederico Augusto de Vasconcelos, whose family had vast properties in the region. Aragão lived on Terceira Island and was no longer politically active. For many years he was manager of Fábrica de Pirolitos FAV Lda. or "Fábrica da Rocha", a soft-drinks factory owned by his wife's family, and managed the company's interests in the União das Fábricas Açorianas de Alcool on Terceira Island. As early as 1953, at Aragão's direction, the factory was modernized with new equipment that remained in use until the earthquake of 1 January 1980, in which it was almost completely destroyed.

=== Joining the Military Aeronautics ===
At this time there was no military aviation in Portugal and the progress of World War I made its inception more urgent. On 14 August 1915, the army announced a competition to recruit 10 army and navy officers to be trained as pilots, who would be sent to foreign schools, there being no piloting school in Portugal. Francisco Xavier da Cunha Aragão was selected along with Cifka Duarte, João Barata Salgueiro Valente and Carlos Esteves Beja; they were sent to California to attend a basic piloting course at the Signal Corps Aviation School, San Diego, to learn to fly seaplanes and conventional airplanes. The group formed the beginnings of the future Portuguese Air Force.

With Portugal's entry into the First World War, the student pilots were transferred to France and continued their training at Juvisy Military Aviation School at Port-Aviation (often called "Juvisy Airfield") in Viry-Châtillon and then at Chartres Pilot School. Aragão received his pilot's licence from the school on 6 November 1916. After passing through Portugal, between November 1917 and January 1918, Aragão was stationed at a base in Mocímboa da Praia, Mozambique. His objective was to create an observation squad to help the Portuguese forces in the fight against incursions from German East Africa (present-day Tanzania). This mission proved impractical because of difficulties with operating the planes, and a chronic lack of pilots and mechanics.

Later, Aragão was a field assistant to the governor-general of Mozambique and served in cavalry operations. In February 1918, he left Mozambique for the Azores to organize an aerodrome there at the request of the United Kingdom. It was to be established in Ponta Delgada, where the United States had built facilities to house seaplanes as part of Ponta Delgada Naval Base. The project to build an aerodrome ultimately failed.

=== The League of Combatants ===
Francisco Aragão was one of the founders of the League of Combatants of the Great War. The first meeting took place on 16 October 1921 at the Lisbon office of the lawyer João Jaime Faria Afonso. It was headed by a "veterans commission" composed of Francisco Aragão, Lieutenant Colonel João Maria Ferreira do Amaral, First Lieutenant Horácio Faria Pereira and Lieutenant Joaquim de Figueiredo Ministro. The League was formed to address the unjust treatment of veterans of the Great War, especially those who had suffered injuries. After fulfilling their duty and oath to give their blood for the homeland, the League believed veterans had been abandoned by the contemporaneous government, causing serious damage to the patriotism, discipline and morals of the Portuguese people.

Aragão signed the "Appeal to the Nation" published in March 1923 by personalities linked to the magazine Seara Nova. Along with Ezequiel de Campos, Jaime Cortesão and Sarmento Pimentel, Aragão was part of the group that handed over the document to António Maria da Silva, who was President of the Republic at that time. Following this initiative, Aragão was also a member of União Cívica's Lisbon Directive Commission, along with António Sérgio, Jaime Cortesão, Filomeno da Câmara, Ferreira do Amaral, Quirino de Jesus and Afonso Augusto Bourbon e Menezes.

Aragão was head of the cabinet of António Germano Guedes Ribeiro de Carvalho, who served as Minister of War under Prime Minister Álvaro de Castro from 18 December 1923 to 26 February 1924. After completing his duties in the Government, Aragão returned to aviation as deputy to the Aeronautics Directorate and inspector of new weaponry. In December 1925, he was appointed to a commission reorganizing the colonial military that was presided over by General Massano de Amorim. In early 1926, in the final months of the First Republic, Aragão was appointed sub-director of Aeronautics for the Portuguese Army, serving until the coup of 28 May 1926 that ended the democratic regime.

=== Revolutionary activities and resignation ===
Having been linked to the republican left from an early age, Francisco Aragão quickly gravitated to a group of military men who opposed the National Dictatorship and the Estado Novo. Initially, he waited to see what direction the new regime would take but after an attempted revolt in February 1927, in which he did not participate, Aragão was considered a political ally of Mendes Cabeçadas and Cunha Leal, and was invited to join the group of revolutionaries. Aragão assumed an equivocal position, apparently hesitating to decide which position to take, and published a text in the newspaper Portugal stating; "I understand that I must not be a supporter of the current government. I consider the victory of the men who revolted in Porto to be pernicious for the Republic and for the Army, and my duties of loyalty oblige me to carry out the orders given to me."

Despite his involvement with revolutionary groups and his loyalty to the former republican government, Aragão had enormous prestige with the military. In December 1927, in an apparent attempt to appease the armed forces, the dictatorship awarded Aragão the rank of Commander of the Military Order of Avis, which he accepted. Aragão continued in government service. By an ordinance of 26 July 1928, the administration of General José Vicente de Freitas created a commission to study the possibility of building an airport in the Azores, of which Aragão was appointed a member. This commission, which was chaired by General João José Sinel de Cordes, was composed of an important group of civil and military personalities, including Rear Admiral Carlos Viegas Gago Coutinho and Frigate Captain Afonso de Cerqueira.

In 1929, he was appointed secretary of the newly-established National Air Council. It was a consultative body created by Decree No. 16424 of 26 January 1929 that had a broad remit to advise on matters of transport, national defence, postal services, colonial and commercial relations, and diplomatic agreements, among others. It coordinated the first studies aimed at creating civil aviation services in Portugal, when that sector was still in its infancy.

In June 1929, Aragão was sent as head of the Portuguese delegation to the meeting of the International Air Navigation Commission in Paris. The delegation also included José Lobo de Ávila Lima, full professor at the Faculty of Law of Lisbon, to support him in legal matters.

Despite his increasing distance from the regime, on 30 January 1931, the Domingos Oliveira-led government praised Aragão for his "intelligent manner, great dedication and unsurpassed activity" as secretary of the National Air Council and in particular for his report on the importance of the Azores for the progress of aeronautics.

As the military dictatorship grew increasingly anti-democratic, Aragão began to define his opposition more clearly. He first openly criticized the Colonial Act and formed closer ties with military officers who repudiated Cunha Leal's imprisonment and exile to the Azores in May 1930. These officers were already advocating revolution as a way to change the dictatorial regime.

The final break occurred when Aragão joined the Madeira Revolt. On 11 April 1931, with no authorization, he took off from Amadora Aerodrome and flew over several cities, dropping leaflets calling for a revolt against the dictatorship. As a lieutenant colonel of the Air Force and head of the Aviation Service, his actions had a great impact and led to his resignation.

== Exile ==
After the Madeira Revolt, Aragão was dismissed from all his duties and forced to flee to Spain. He settled in France, where he joined a group of Portuguese republican exiles known as the Paris League. Aragão's relationship with them was difficult and in 1932, he informed Bernardino Machado he was leaving the group together with Ribeiro de Carvalho.

In December 1932, Aragão returned to Portugal with a group of political exiles and deportees, expecting an amnesty but he was arrested in July 1933 and placed under house arrest. Despite the limitations on his movements, Aragão was able to reconnect with opponents of the regime and in September 1933, he travelled to Vigo to meet José Domingues dos Santos, Sarmento de Beires, Ribeiro de Carvalho and others. Opponents of the dictatorship were seeking to form a united front. In December of that year, Aragão took part in a meeting in Madrid aimed at analyzing the consequences of the failed mid-November revolt attempt.

Due to his repeated challenges to the regime and despite his enormous prestige, in 1933, Aragão was dismissed from the army and forced back into exile. In 1935, opposition to the Estado Novo was rekindled after the victory of the Popular Front in Spain. A Committee of Friends of Portugal, in which Cunha Aragão took part, was formed in Madrid. Along with others, Aragão give radio talks addressed to Portugal to be broadcast by Unión Radio Madrid but these were never broadcast due to opposition from the Portuguese government. Aragão left for Paris at the beginning of the Spanish Civil War but as the Second World War began in Europe, he and other exiled conspirators were forced to return to Portugal in the mid-1940s. While entering Portugal, Aragão was arrested by the State Surveillance and Defence Police (PVDE) on 27 May 1940, along with Jaime Cortesão, Maria Judith Zuzarte Cortesão and Álvaro Poppe.

== Works ==
Aragão contributed to the magazines Seara Nova, Men Livres (1923) and Luso Colonial, and occasionally wrote for other publications. He is the author of the following works:

- Black Troops: the overseas forces in national defence, Lisbon, Ed. author, 1926. - 166p.
- "Airlines in Angola", Luso Colonial, no. 16-17 (1928), p. 243-244.

== Honours ==
Francisco Aragão reached the rank of lieutenant colonel. In addition to multiple military medals, he was made an Officer of the Legion of Honour on 29 November 1930, an Officer of the Military Order of the Tower and Sword, of Valor, Loyalty and Merit by decree of 31 March 1923, and Knight, Officer and Commander of the Military Order of Avis on 27 December 1927, and Commander of the Military Order of Christ on 31 May 1928.

The patriotic enthusiasm surrounding the events of Naulila led to several places being named after Aragão; these include Rua Tenente Aragão in the cities Horta and Leiria.
