= João Maria Barreto Ferreira do Amaral, 2nd Baron of Oliveira Lima =

Portuguese nobleman

João Maria Barreto Ferreira do Amaral, 2nd Baron of Oliveira Lima, OC, 5 January 1909 – 4 December 1995) was a Portuguese nobleman.

== Ancestry ==
He was born in Lisbon, São Pedro de Alcântara, the only son of Augusto Basto Ferreira do Amaral (Nova Goa, Goa, India, 17 October 1886 - Lisbon, São Sebastião da Pedreira, 10 February 1947). His father was an electrical engineer from the University of London, Director of the Instituto Industrial do Porto, Officer of the Order of Aviz, etc., His mother was Júlia Salvação Barreto (Lisbon, Santos o Velho, 10 June 1884 – Lisbon, 8 June 1980), daughter of Joaquim Maria da Silva Barreto and wife Mariana Filomena Salvação, a descendant of Gil Vicente and possibly of a second cousin of Gustav I of Sweden. His paternal grandparents were Francisco Joaquim Ferreira do Amaral and Maria Helena de Albuquerque, 1st Baroness of Oliveira Lima.

== Life ==
He was an electrical engineer and a Licentiate in Physico-Chemical Sciences from the University of Porto and was a former Director-General of Industrial Services and Member of the Superior Counsel of Economy, etc.

He was created an Officer of the Order of the Christ and became the 2nd Baron of Oliveira Lima by Alvará of the Conselho de Nobreza of 14 June 1981.

== Marriage and issue ==
He married in Lisbon, Nossa Senhora de Fátima, on 7 October 1939 Maria José da Graça Facco Viana de Oliveira Martins (Alcochete, São João Baptista, 2 October 1908 - 18 January 2001), daughter of Joaquim de Oliveira Martins (Coimbra, São Bartolomeu, 17 May 1881 - Lisbon, Campo Grande, 28 June 1931) and wife (m. Alcochete, São João Baptista, 19 March 1906) Maria Joaquina Pereira Coutinho Facco Viana (Lisbon, São Jorge de Arroios, 3 September 1884 - ?), of Italian descent and granddaughter of the Marquis of Soydos, and had one daughter and four sons:

- Maria Joaquina Martins Ferreira do Amaral (born Lisbon, São Sebastião da Pedreira, 7 April 1941), Administration Secretary, unmarried and without issue
- Augusto Martins Ferreira do Amaral, 3rd Baron of Oliveira Lima (born Lisbon, São Sebastião da Pedreira, 15 June 1942)
- Joaquim Martins Ferreira do Amaral (born Lisbon, São Sebastião da Pedreira, 13 April 1945)
- Francisco Martins Ferreira do Amaral (born Lisbon, São Sebastião da Pedreira, 18 December 1946), Chemical Engineer from the Instituto Superior Técnico of the University of Lisbon, married Gunzenhausen, Weissenburg-Gunzenhausen, Bavaria, West Germany, 2 April 1980 German Ingrid Maria Lauer (born Gunzenhausen, Weissenburg-Gunzenhausen, Bavaria, West Germany, 5 November 1950), daughter of Wilhelm (Willy) Otto Lauer and wife Louise Babeta Ganzer, and has two children:
  - Francisca Lauer Ferreira do Amaral (born Lisbon, São Sebastião da Pedreira, 9 January 1981)
  - Pedro Lauer Ferreira do Amaral (born Lisbon, São Domingos de Benfica, 18 May 1983)
- João Martins Ferreira do Amaral (born Lisbon, São Sebastião da Pedreira, 16 September 1948), unmarried and without issue

== Sources ==
- Anuário da Nobreza de Portugal, III, 1985, Tomo II, pp. 758–761
