= League of Combatants =

Organisation of Portuguese Armed and Security Forces veterans

- Liga dos Combatentes
- Abbreviation: LC
- Formation: 16 October 1923; 102 years ago (de facto); 29 January 1924 (de jure)
- Founder: João Jaime de Faria Affonso (1896–1966)
- Type: Ex-service organisation
- Legal status: Public utility status (instituição de utilidade pública)
- Headquarters: 18, Rua João Pereira da Rosa; Misericórdia, Lisbon
- Publication: Combatente
- Website: www.ligacombatentes.org

The League of Combatants ComTE MHTE MHIH ComB MHM (Portuguese: Liga dos Combatentes), originally established as the League of Combatants of the Great War (Portuguese: Liga dos Combatentes da Grande Guerra), is a Portuguese ex-service organisation established following the First World War. A private institution with public utility status, it is answerable to the Ministry of National Defence.

== History ==
The first meeting of the League of Combatants of the Great War took place on 16 October 1923, at the office of the lawyer João Jaime Faria Afonso in Lisbon. Faria Affonso had been lobbying for the creation of the League starting in 1919, but achieved little initial success.

The League was then headed by a "veterans commission" composed of Lieutenant Colonel Francisco Xavier da Cunha Aragão, Lieutenant Colonel João Maria Ferreira do Amaral, First Lieutenant Horácio Faria Pereira and Lieutenant Joaquim de Figueiredo Ministro. The League was established due to the unjust treatment of Great War veterans, especially those who had suffered lasting injuries. The founders of the League believed that, after having had fulfilled their duty and oath to spill their blood for the homeland, the veterans had (perhaps even intentionally) been abandoned by the government then in power, causing serious damage to the patriotism, discipline and morals of the Portuguese people.

== Distinctions ==
- Commander of the Military Order of the Tower and Sword (5 September 1932)
- Honorary Member of the Military Order of the Tower and Sword (9 April 2021)
- Honorary Member of the Order of Prince Henry the Navigator (20 November 1968)
- Commander of the Order of Benefaction (29 July 1937)
- Honorary Member of the Order of Merit (5 October 2016)
