= De Macedo =

De Macedo may refer to:

- Édouard de Macedo (c.1900–1965), Brazilian founder of France scouting
- Evaristo de Macedo (born 1933), Brazilian footballer
- Joaquim Manuel de Macedo (1820–1882), author
- José Agostinho de Macedo (1761–1831), Portuguese poet and prose writer
- José Monteiro de Macedo (born 1982), Guinea-Bissauan football defender
- Lota de Macedo Soares (1910–1967), Brazilian aesthete
- Leandro Netto de Macedo (born 1979), Brazilian football player
- João Afonso da Costa de Sousa de Macedo (1815–1890), 1st duke of Albuquerque
- Vinny deMacedo (born 1965), Cape Verdean American politician

== See also ==
- Macedo
