= Vicente Nicolau de Mesquita =

Macanese hero

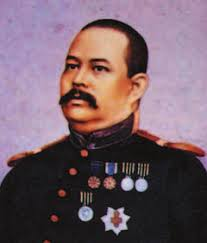
- Born: July 9, 1818; Colony of Macau, Portuguese Empire
- Died: March 20, 1880 (aged 61) Colony of Macau, Portuguese Empire
- Allegiance: (Portugal) Portuguese Empire
- Branch: Army
- Service years: 1835–1880
- Rank: Colonel
- Conflicts: Baishaling Incident
- Awards: List of awards: Commander of the Fortress of Taipa; Commander of the Fort of São Tiago da Barra and the Fortress of Monte; Member of the Government Council and the Council of Military Justice; Knight of the Order of the Immaculate Conception of Vila Viçosa (September 15, 1855); Knight of the Order of Aviz (October 6, 1857); Commander of the Order of Aviz (January 15, 1869); Silver Medal of Military Valor; Gold Medal of Exemplary Conduct

Vicente Nicolau de Mesquita (July 9, 1818, in São Lourenço, Portuguese Macau – March 20, 1880, in São Lourenço, Portuguese Macau) was an officer of the Portuguese Army in Macau. He is widely remembered for his role at the Portuguese attack of Baishaling, in 1849. He was the oldest of the five children of noted Macanese lawyer Frederico Albino de Mesquita and Clara Esmeralda Carneiro – both Macau natives. He married twice: first to Balbina Maria da Silveira; second to his sister-in-law Carolina Maria Josefa da Silveira.

== Baishaling Incident ==
Immediately after a Chinese mob assassinated Governor Ferreira do Amaral on August 22, 1849, Chinese Imperial troops mobilized on the Guangdong Province – Macau frontier. The Portuguese population of Macau viewed this as an overtly threatening move by the Chinese to retake Macau. On August 25, 1849, with a numerically smaller group of 36 soldiers from his Artillery Battalion, against a defending force of 400 men and 20 cannons, the then Second Lieutenant Mesquita attacked and pacified the Chinese fort at Baishaling. This coup guaranteed Macau's security and upon his return to the city, Mesquita was received as a national hero.

== Later years ==
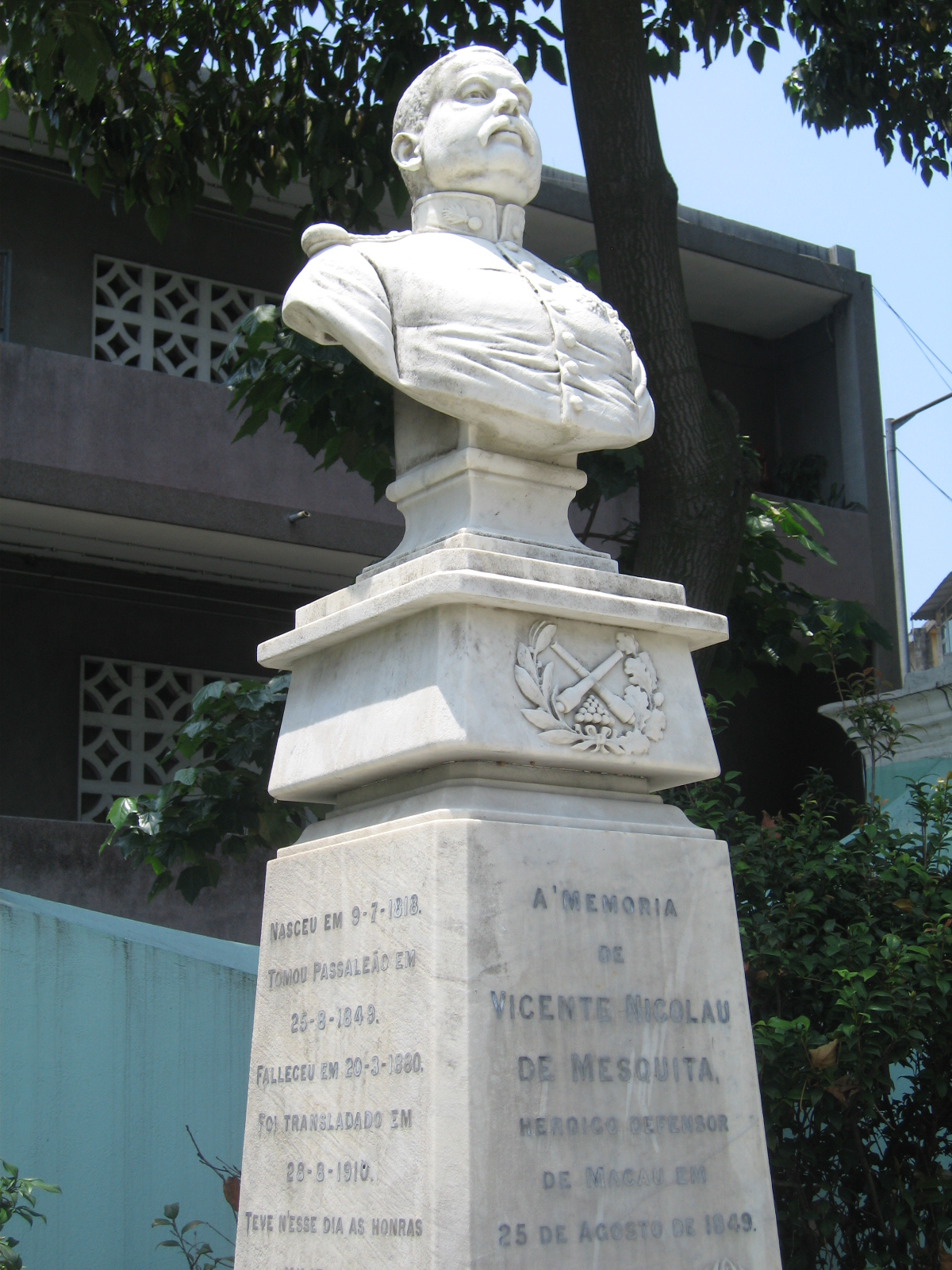
The gravestone of Vicente Nicolau de Mesquita in Macau

In later years, Mesquita was wracked by depression due to his slow and inadequate promotion in the Portuguese military, allegedly due to being Macanese. He was further saddened by the lack official recognition of his role in protecting Macau. As a result, he suffered a series of severe nervous breakdowns – the last of which prompted his permanent retirement. His professional and personal life deteriorated rapidly afterwards. His madness reached its zenith on March 3, 1880 – at his fashionable home: nº 1, Largo da Bica do Lilau – when Mesquita murdered his second wife, a daughter and gravely wounded two other of his children. Afterwards, on that same day, Mesquia committed suicide by throwing himself down a well at his home.

Under these circumstances, the then present governor of Macau would not accord him a military burial, nor would the Bishop of Macau allow his remains to be placed in consecrated ground. Some thirty years later, on August 28, 1910, in conformity with public opinion on the importance of this man to the history of Macau, were his remains re-interred in the Cemitério de São Miguel Arcanjo with full military and ecclesiastical honors.

== Military career ==
- June 9, 1835 – voluntarily enlisted in Batalhão do Principe Regente.
- August 29, 1848 – promoted to second lieutenant in the Artillery Battalion of Macau, by patent letter.
- December 12, 1850 – promoted to first lieutenant in the same Battalion by patent letter.
- July 9, 1863 – made effective major, by decree of the same date.
- February 7, 1867 – promoted to lieutenant colonel.
- October 27, 1873 – promoted to colonel.
