= Macedo =

Macedo is a Portuguese language surname and previously a Roman cognomen. It may refer to:

== People ==
- Amaro Macedo (1914–2014), Brazilian botanist
- António de Macedo (1931–2017), Portuguese film director
- António Macedo (painter) (born 1955), Portuguese painter
- Aulus Larcius Macedo (suffect consul 124), Roman senator
- Breno Macedo (born 1993), Brazilian politician
- Carlos Macedo (born 1965), Portuguese actor
- Diane Macedo (born 1982), American journalist
- Donaldo Macedo (born 1950), American scholar
- Edir Macedo (born 1945), Brazilian religious leader
- Felipe Macedo (born 1994), Brazilian football player
- Francisco Macedo (theologian) (1596–1681), Portuguese theologian
- Francisco Macedo (racing driver) (born 2000), Portuguese racing driver
- Guilherme Macedo dos Anjos (born 1989), Brazilian professional football coach
- Isabel Macedo (born 1975), Argentine actress
- Jean Carlos Macedo da Silva (born 1980), Brazilian football player
- Joílson Rodrigues Macedo (born 1979), Brazilian football player
- John Macedo (born 1985), British dark ambient musician
- José Macedo Vieira (born 1949), Portuguese politician
- Leandro Macedo (born 1968), Brazilian athlete
- Luis de Llano Macedo (born 1945), Mexican television producer
- Macedo Novaes (born 1983), Brazilian football player
- Manuel Lepe Macedo (1936–1984), Mexican artist
- Marcos Macedo (born 1990), Brazilian swimmer
- Maria Paula Macedo (born 1963) Portuguese Scientist
- Michel Macedo (born 1990), Brazilian football player
- Miguel Macedo (born 1959), Portuguese politician
- Mirta Macedo (1939 - 2012), Uruguayan writer
- Natanael dos Santos Macedo (born 1969), Brazilian retired football player
- Paulo Macedo (born 1963), Portuguese politician
- Paulo Macedo (basketball) (born 1968), Angolan basketball coach
- Pedro Macedo (born 1928)(Portuguese Politician Minister of Justice)
- Rafael Macedo de la Concha (born 1950), Mexican general
- Rita Macedo (1925–1993), Mexican actress
- Sergio Macedo (born 1951), Brazilian comic artist
- Stephen Macedo (born 1957), American political scientist
- Teresa Costa Macedo (1943–2025), Portuguese politician
- Veronica Macedo (born 1995), Venezuelan mixed martial artist
- Viviane Macedo (born 1977), choreographer, dancer, and actress
- Watson Macedo (1918–1981), Brazilian filmmaker

== Places ==
- Coronel Macedo, Brazil
- Dom Macedo Costa, Brazil
- Macedo de Cavaleiros, Portugal
- Macedo do Mato, Portugal
- Macedo Dr. Mission Viejo, California

== Other uses ==
- Macedo (musical group)

== See also ==
- de Macedo
