= International Day Commemorating the Victims of Acts of Violence Based on Religion or Belief =

UN-sponsored annual awareness day

- Date: 22 August
- Next time: 22 August 2025
- Frequency: Annual
- Website: International Day Commemorating the Victims of Acts of Violence Based on Religion or Belief, United Nations

International Day Commemorating the Victims of Acts of Violence Based on Religion or Belief is a United Nations-sponsored annual awareness day that takes place on 22 August as part of the UN's efforts to support Human Rights Related to Freedom of Religion or Belief. It was first introduced in 2019.
