= Maria Judith Zuzarte Cortesão =

Portuguese writer

Maria Judith Zuzarte Cortesão (31 December 1914 – 25 September 2007) was a climatologist, geneticist and psychologist. In 2003, she was awarded the Ordem do Mérito Cultural.

== Life ==
In 1940, she went into exile in Brazil, with her family. She was a professor at Federal University of Rio Grande.

== Family ==
She was the daughter of the historian Jaime Zuzarte Cortesão. She married Agostinho da Silva. They had eight children.

== Works ==
- Mata atlântica, Editora Index : Fundação S.O.S. Mata Atlântica, 1991.
- Juréia : a luta pela vida [São Paulo] Ed. Index 1989. ISBN 9788570830241
