= Henry Bachtold =

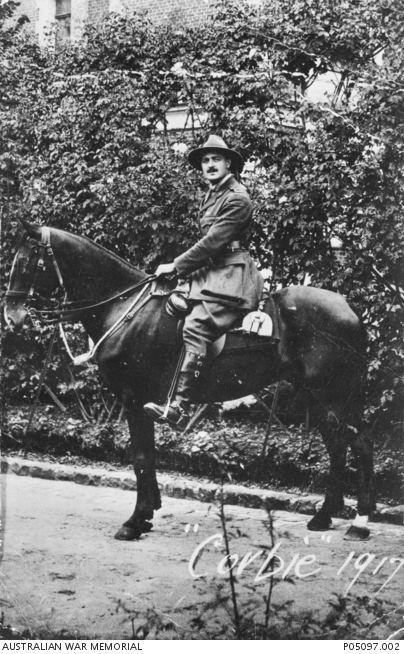
- Born: 22 August 1891; Stanningley, Yorkshire, England
- Died: 9 May 1983 (aged 91); Sylvania, New South Wales, Australia
- Burial place: Woronora Cemetery and Crematorium, Sutherland
- Spouse: Dorothy Garner
- Military career
- Allegiance: Australia
- Branch: Australian Army
- Service years: 1914–1922; 1940–1943
- Rank: Brigadier
- Service number: NX100435
- Commands: 14th Field Company
- Conflicts: First World War; Gallipoli campaign; Western Front; Battle of Polygon Wood; Second World War
- Awards: Distinguished Service Order; Military Cross; Mentioned in Despatches (4)
- Other work: Railway engineer

Brigadier Henry Bachtold, DSO, MC (22 August 1891 – 9 May 1983) was an Australian soldier and railway engineer. He fought during the First World War as an engineer with the 1st Field Company at the Gallipoli Campaign, where he was mentioned in despatches and awarded the Military Cross. He commanded the 14th Field Company at the Battle of Polygon Wood, for which he was appointed a Companion of the Distinguished Service Order. Bachtold commanded the engineers of the 5th Australian Division in 1917–18 and the engineers of the 3rd Australian Division in 1918. He was mentioned in despatches four times during the First World War and ended the war as a lieutenant colonel. During 1942 and 1943, Bachtold was the Chief Engineer of II Corps, after which he was placed in reserve with the honorary rank of brigadier. Bachtold retired from the Department of Railways New South Wales in 1962 and died on 9 May 1983.

== Early life and First World War ==
Bachtold was born on 22 August 1891 at Stanningley, the son of Heinrich and Ann Bachtold. He was educated at the University of Manchester between 1908 and 1910 and graduated with a Bachelor of Engineering. Bachtold immigrated to Australia in August 1911 and shortly afterwards became an engineering draftsman with New South Wales Government Railways. He enlisted in the Australian Imperial Force with the rank of second lieutenant on 23 September 1914. Bachtold was posted to the 1st Field Company of the Australian Engineers.

The 1st Field Company departed Melbourne on 22 December 1914 aboard HMAT Berrima. Bachtold participated in the initial landing at ANZAC Cove on 25 April 1915 and was awarded a Military Cross for gallantry under fire and mentioned in despatches. He was promoted to lieutenant on the day of the landing and was promoted again to temporary captain in July 1915. Bachtold participated in the building of tunnels for mines under the Turkish lines.

In November 1915, Bachtold was transferred to Egypt on special duty and was confirmed as a captain a month later. In March 1916, Bachtold took command of the 14th Field Company, and was promoted to major on 19 April. The 14th Field Company embarked for France in June 1916 and joined the fighting on the Western Front the following month, serving around Pas-de-Calais until October when the company was moved to the Somme Department. Bachtold was mentioned in despatches a second time in January 1917.

In March 1917, the company participated in the pursuit after the German withdrawal to the Hindenburg Line. Bachtold was mentioned in despatches a third time in June 1917. He acted as the Commander, Royal Engineers, 5th Australian Division four times between April 1917 and January 1918, and was awarded the Distinguished Service Order for gallantry at the Battle of Polygon Wood.

In May 1918, Bachtold became the Commander Royal Engineers, 3rd Australian Division, and was promoted to temporary lieutenant colonel on 8 June 1918. He was later confirmed in that rank. He was mentioned in despatches a fourth time in December 1918.

== Later life ==
Bachtold returned to Australia on 8 July 1919 with his wife, Dorothy Garner, whom he had married the previous year. He was transferred to the Reserve of Officers in 1922. Bachtold was called up in the Citizen Military Forces in September 1940. Bachtold became Chief Engineer Eastern Command in February 1941 as a temporary colonel. Between April 1942 and March 1943, Bachtold was the Chief Engineer II Corps. He was transferred to the Reserve of Officers as an honorary brigadier in July 1943. He was appointed as the Railways' Assistant Chief Civil Engineer, Workshops in July 1946. Bachtold retired in November 1952. Bachtold died on 9 May 1983 at the age of 91.
