= Viviane Macedo =

Brazilian dancer

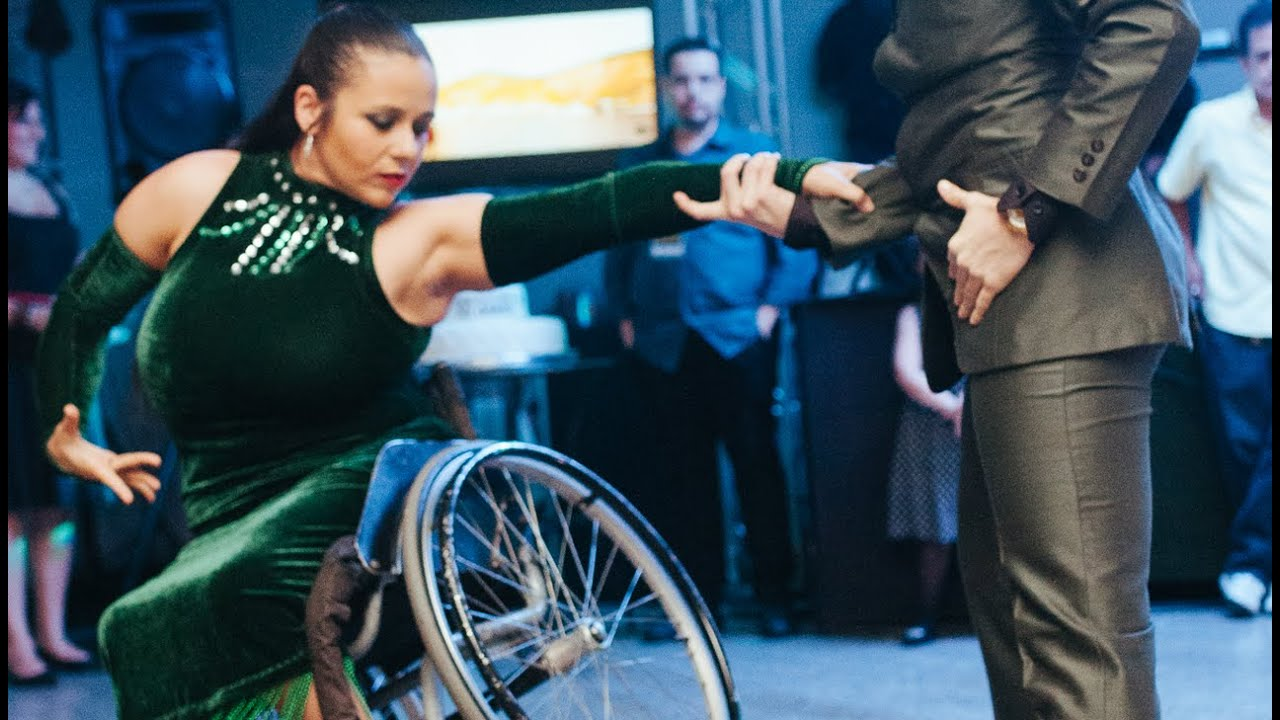
- Born: 22 August 1977 (age 48); Rio de Janeiro, Brazil
- Occupations: Choreographer; Dancer; Actress
- Notable work: Carioca Sobre Rodas
- Website: ciavivianemacedo.com

Viviane Macedo (born 22 August 1977 in Rio de Janeiro) is a choreographer, dancer, and actress. She began her career in wheelchair dancesport in the late 1990s. Throughout her career, she has been continuously involved in cultural projects, artistic festivals, and training initiatives in Brazil and abroad, focusing on inclusive art.

Her institutional work includes collaborations with organizations such as the Brazilian Institute for the Rights of Persons with Disabilities (IBDD), the Confederation of Wheelchair Dancesport, and the Brazilian Para Dance Council. She has also partnered with notable figures in Brazilian ballroom dance, including Carlinhos de Jesus and Jaime Arôxa, and was part of the Escola Carioca de Dança.

In 2005, she became a pioneer as the first wheelchair user to perform as a flag bearer in the carnival group Senta que eu Empurro. She also participated in the Sem Limites project of the Crescer e Viver Circus NGO, where she worked as a circus artist and accessibility consultant. Within this context, she contributed to the selection of artists for Belonging, a co-production between the British organization Graeae Theatre Company, Crescer e Viver Circus, and the British Council Brazil.

Currently, Macedo is the director of her own dance company and is dedicated to advocating for the rights of people with disabilities, expanding her social impact through both in-person and digital initiatives.

== Foundation of Cia Viviane Macedo ==
The creation of Cia Viviane Macedo began in 2010, when Macedo was contacted by a young woman interested in learning wheelchair dance after seeing her work online. Motivated by the challenge, she began teaching even without formal teacher training.

From this initiative, the project gradually gained structure, and in 2012, with the support of the company Gerdau, the company was officially founded. Since then, Cia Viviane Macedo has offered accessible dance classes for people with disabilities aged seven and older, in a space adapted to promote inclusion and artistic development. Over the years, the company has made a significant contribution to the development and inclusion of youth and adults in inclusive art both in Brazil and abroad.

== Achievements and recognition ==
Since her debut in official competitions in 2006, Macedo has become a five-time Brazilian champion in wheelchair dancesport. Internationally, she stood out by reaching 20th place in the world ranking, participating in competitions in Germany and Belarus.

On other notable occasions, she performed for Queen Beatrix of the Netherlands during UNICEF’s 50th-anniversary celebrations and represented Brazil at Casa Brasil during the Sydney Paralympic Games in 2000. In 2013, she participated in the International Gala in Cape Verde at the invitation of the NGO Mon na Roda, returning in 2014 as a workshop instructor.

== Work in Canada ==
Now living in Toronto, Ontario, Macedo continues to work as an artist, consultant, and digital influencer. Through her online platforms, she shares reflections on inclusion, accessibility, and her experiences as a woman with a disability living abroad, promoting cultural and social change through art and representation.
