= Maria Helena de Albuquerque, 1st Baroness of Oliveira Lima =

Portuguese noble

Maria Helena de Albuquerque, 1st Baroness of Oliveira Lima (Funchal, São Pedro, 1817 – Lisbon, 6 June 1909) was a Portuguese noblewoman.

== Ancestry ==
She was the seventh of eight children of João Agostinho de Freitas Brito Figueiroa e Albuquerque (Funchal, Santa Maria Maior, 14 June 1793 - London, 27 October 1862), Successor in many Majorats, Colonel of Auxiliary Artillery, 372nd Commander of the Order of the Immaculate Conception of Vila Viçosa (14 April 1852), and wife (m. Machico, Porto da Cruz, 1811) Carlota Amália de Ornelas e Vasconcelos (Funchal, Santa Maria Maior, 2 June 1797 - Funchal, São Pedro, 15 October 1860), sister of the ...th Lord of the Majorat and 1st Baron of São Pedro.

== Marriages and issue ==
She married three times. Her first husband, whom she had married in 1836, António Teixeira Dória, ...th Lord of the Majorat of ..., son of Francisco Teixeira Dória and wife (m. Funchal, Sé, 1798) Joana Margarida da Câmara, was a First Mate in a Navy corvette whose Commander was João Maria Ferreira do Amaral (Lisbon, Alcântara, 4 March 1803 - Macau, 22 August 1849). According to their descendant Augusto Martins Ferreira do Amaral, 3rd Baron of Oliveira Lima, Maria Helena cheated on her first husband with her later second husband, and believes that a first son of hers, during her first marriage, João Eduardo Teixeira Dória, an Artillery Officer, born in Lisbon, São Paulo, on 13 October 1841, who died unmarried and without issue, was already João Maria Ferreira do Amaral's son, for he had similar features. She separated from the First Mate, went on to live in a Nunnery Convent, and got again pregnant to the ship's Commander, although this baby was already baptized as son of João Maria Ferreira do Amaral and an unknown mother, in order not to be registered under the name of her first husband. In Lisbon, Santa Catarina, on 20 October 1849, almost two months after the incident in which he was killed and without knowing that news, in order to legitimize their son Francisco Joaquim Ferreira do Amaral and their daughter Joana Teresa de Albuquerque, Maria Helena de Albuquerque, then a widow, married the deceased by proxy, taking advantage of the fact that, early in that year, her first husband had also died.

The financial difficulties forced her to marry a third time, to a great friend of the late João Maria Ferreira do Amaral, the Deputy in the Legislature of 1848–1851, who did not have any activity in the Chamber, Councilor and Director-General of the Ministry of the Navy and Overseas Manuel Jorge de Oliveira Lima (Porto, Santo Ildefonso, 13 October 1804 - Lisbon, 11 July 1876), of whom she was also widowed, a few years later, without issue. Her son distinguished himself as a military officer and became Vice-Admiral and Admiral of the Portuguese Navy, being able to conquer important territories in Cabinda, Angola. For his successes, the realm wanted to grant him the title of Count, which he refused, suggesting that it would be better to grant his mother instead, who would be happier with it. She was then created 1st Baroness of Oliveira Lima (Decree of 18 October 1883), also in remuneration of the services of her late third husband.

== Later life and death ==
She lived until age 92, making trips throughout Europe and leaving her home every day, but always refusing to pass on a street of Lisbon where a Miguelist lived because she despised them.

== Sources ==
- Anuário da Nobreza de Portugal, III, 1985, Tomo II, pp. 758–761
- GeneAll.net - Maria Helena de Albuquerque, 1st Baroness of Oliveira Lima at www.geneall.net Helena Maria de Albuquerque, 1st Baroness of Oliveira Lima
