= Revolt of the Faitiões =

The Revolt of the Faitiões (Chinese: 十·八慘案; Portuguese: Revolta dos Faitiões) was an armed insurrection against Portuguese rule in Macau that took place on 8 October 1846. The revolt was prompted by a duty imposed on the faitiões ("fast boats [junks]", from Chinese fai teang) by the new governor. João Maria Ferreira do Amaral had been appointed governor of Macau on 21 April 1846 in the aftermath of the First Opium War, when the Portuguese wanted to assert their rights against a weak and defeated China and resist the rapid expansion of British influence in the region.

The new regulations, suggested by the procurator, Manuel Pereira, required all Chinese faitiões to be registered and to pay a fee of one pataca a month. On 3 October Amaral ordered Pereira to jail any boatmen who continued to refuse to pay the new duty. In response, many Chinese gathered in protests at the New Pagoda (Pagode Novo). On 7 October about forty armed faitiões entered the Inner Harbour. The next day a large number disembarked with three cannons. They marched up the road to the church of Santo António, where they confronted and fired upon a group of sepoys (native soldiers in Portuguese pay). Portuguese reinforcements soon arrived and dispersed the mob. The Fortaleza do Monte then opened fire on the junks. Although rebel casualties were severe, there were no serious injuries to the Portuguese.

The Chinese of the city responded to Amaral's military actions by withholding supplies, but when the governor threatened to destroy the Chinese quarter, they relented and delivered the supplies. On the morning of 9 October, all the shops in Macau opened their doors for business as usual. On 10 October two mandarins arrived before Macau to compliment the governor on restoring order and assure him of Chinese friendship.

== Sources ==
- França, Bento da (1888). Subsidios para a historia de Macau. Lisbon: Imprensa Nacional.
- Garrett, Richard J. (2010). The Defences of Macau: Forts, Ships and Weapons over 450 Years. Hong Kong University Press.
