= Francisco Ferreira do Amaral =

Portuguese naval commander and politician

Admiral Francisco Ferreira do Amaral GCTE
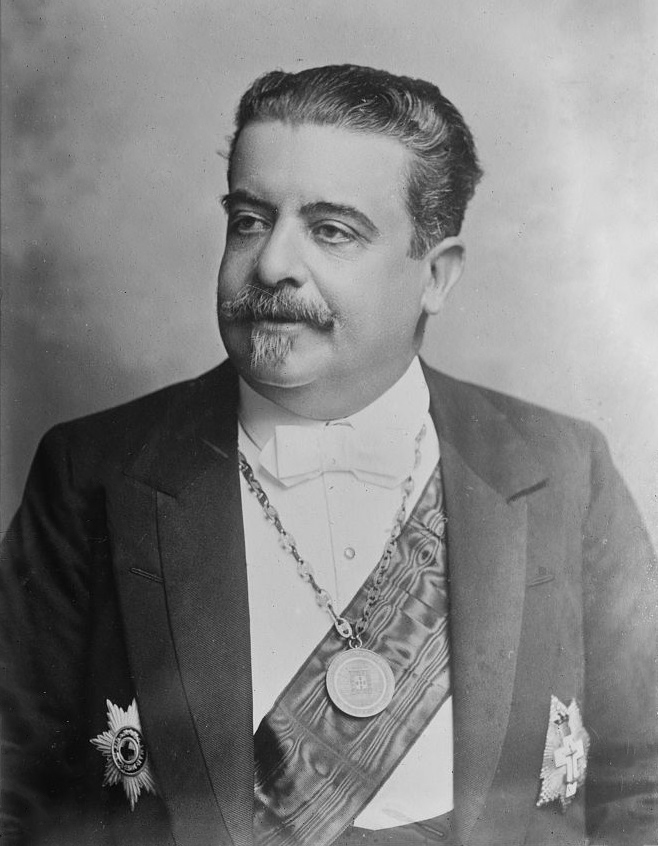

Prime Minister of Portugal
- In office 4 February 1908 – 26 December 1908
- Monarch: Manuel II
- Preceded by: João Franco
- Succeeded by: Artur de Campos Henriques

Minister of the Navy and Overseas of Portugal
- In office 17 January 1892 – 22 February 1893
- Monarch: Carlos I
- Prime Minister: José Dias Ferreira
- Preceded by: Júlio de Vilhena
- Succeeded by: João António das Neves Ferreira

Minister of Foreign Affairs of Portugal
- Interim; 6 July – 23 July 1892
- Monarch: Carlos I
- Prime Minister: Ernesto Hintze Ribeiro
- Preceded by: António Frutuoso Aires de Gouveia Osório
- Succeeded by: António Frutuoso Aires de Gouveia Osório (as interim)

Minister of the Interior of Portugal
- In office 4 February – 25 December 1908
- Monarch: Manuel II
- Prime Minister: Himself
- Preceded by: João Franco
- Succeeded by: Artur de Campos Henriques

Governor of São Tomé and Príncipe
- In office 28 September – 28 December 1879
- Monarch: Luís I
- Prime Minister: Anselmo José Braamcamp
- Minister of the Navy and Overseas: António Maria José de Melo César e Meneses
- Preceded by: Estanislau Xavier de Assunção e Almeida
- Succeeded by: Custódio Miguel de Borja (as interim)

Governor-General of Angola
- In office 1882–1886
- Monarch: Luís I
- Prime Minister: Fontes Pereira de Melo; José Luciano de Castro
- Minister of the Navy and Overseas: José Eduardo de Melo Gouveia; José Vicente Barbosa du Bocage; Júlio de Vilhena (as interim); José Vicente Barbosa du Bocage; Manuel Pinheiro Chagas; Henrique de Macedo Pereira Coutinho
- Preceded by: António Eleutério Dantas
- Succeeded by: Guilherme Augusto de Brito Capelo

Governor of Portuguese India
- Not taken office
- In office 12 April – 1 November 1896
- Monarch: Luís I
- Prime Minister: Ernesto Hintze Ribeiro
- Preceded by: Government Council of the State of India
- Succeeded by: Government Council of the State of India

Governor of Moçâmedes
- In office 1878–1879
- Monarch: Luís I
- Prime Minister: Fontes Pereira de Melo
- Minister of the Navy and Overseas: Jacinto Cândido
- Governor-General of Angola: Caetano Alexandre de Almeida e Albuquerque
- Preceded by: Sebastião Nunes da Mata
- Succeeded by: Sebastião Nunes da Mata

Personal details
- Born: Francisco Joaquim Ferreira do Amaral; 11 June 1843 Lisbon, Portugal
- Died: 11 August 1923 (aged 80) Lisbon, Portugal
- Party: Independent
- Spouse(s): Carolina Amélia Bastos; Ilegitimate: Servant; Wife of Guilherme de Albuquerque Carvalhal e França
- Relations: Guilherme de Albuquerque Carvalhal e França (first cousin)
- Children: João Maria Basto Ferreira do Amaral; Maria Cristina Basto Ferreira do Amaral; Augusto Basto Ferreira do Amara; Ilegitimate: Serícia Emília Ferreira do Amaral; João Maria Ferreira do Amaral II
- Parent(s): João Maria Ferreira do Amaral (father); Maria Helena de Albuquerque, 1st Baroness of Oliveira Lima (mother)

Military service
- Allegiance: Kingdom of Portugal
- Branch/service: (Kingdom of Portugal) Portuguese Navy
- Years of service: 1879–1908
- Rank: Admiral

Francisco Joaquim Ferreira do Amaral, GCTE (Lisbon, Santa Catarina, 11 June 1843 – 11 August 1923) was a Portuguese naval commander and politician.

== Parents ==
He was the only son of João Maria Ferreira do Amaral and his wife Maria Helena de Albuquerque, 1st Baroness of Oliveira Lima.

== Career ==
He distinguished himself as a military and became a vice-admiral and admiral of the Portuguese Navy, conquering important territories in Cabinda, Angola. For his successes, the realm wanted to grant him the title of count, which he refused, suggesting that it would be better to grant it to his mother instead, who would be happier with it.

He served as a Peer of the Realm by Royal Letter of 17 March 1898, Member of the Council of His Most Faithful Majesty, Minister of State and the first President of the Council of Ministers of King Manuel II of Portugal, or Prime Minister of Portugal, Deputy of the Nation, Governor of Moçâmedes, Governor of São Tomé e Príncipe, 78th Governor of Angola (1882–1886) (1882–1886) and 101st Governor of the State of India (1886–1886), president of the Society of Geography, 308th Grand Cross of the Order of the Tower and Sword, etc. He was also created an Honorary Knight Commander of the Royal Victorian Order.

== Marriage and issue ==
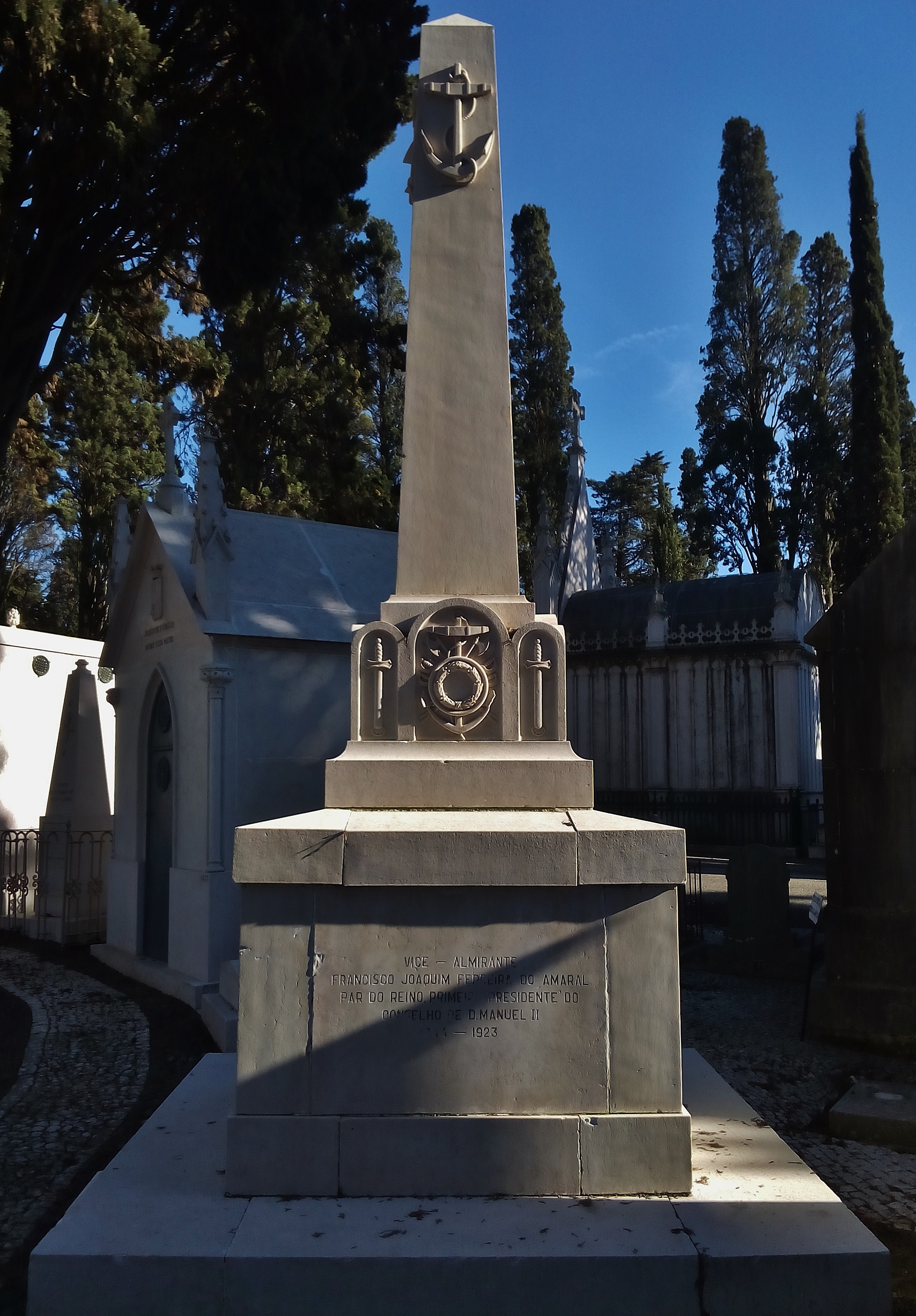
Grave of Francisco Ferreira do Amaral, Prazeres Graveyard, Lisbon

He married in Lisbon, São Julião, on 12 September 1880 Carolina Amélia Bastos (Lisbon, Santa Justa, 4 November 1852 – Goa, India, 22 October 1886), daughter of António Inácio Bastos and his wife Maria Cristina da Conceição Tibau, and had three children:

- João Maria Basto Ferreira do Amaral (1881 – 27 September 1884)
- Maria Cristina Basto Ferreira do Amaral (Luanda, 18 March 1883 – Penamacor, Aldeia de João Pires, 15 September 1960), married António Emídio Taborda de Azevedo e Costa (Penamacor, Penamacor – Penamacor, Aldeia de João Pires), and had issue
- Augusto Basto Ferreira do Amaral (Nova Goa, Goa, India, 17 October 1886 – Lisbon, São Sebastião da Pedreira, 10 February 1947)

=== Illegitimate issue ===
Before his marriage, he had two more recognized children.

At age 18, he impregnated a servant from his house (who was also the mistress and later second wife of his first cousin Guilherme de Albuquerque Carvalhal e França, by whom she had Júlio de Albuquerque e França), which scandal led them both to be expelled from their home, and had one daughter:

- Serícia Emília Ferreira do Amaral (Lisbon, September 1861 – ?), unmarried and without issue

By Augusta Frederica Smith Chaves (c. 1850 – after 1923), of English descent, he had one son:

- João Maria Ferreira do Amaral (Lisbon, São Julião, 14 June 1876 – Lisbon, 11 March/3 November 1931)

== References and notes ==
- GeneAll.net – Francisco Joaquim Ferreira do Amaral at www.geneall.net Francisco Joaquim Ferreira do Amaral

== Sources ==
- Anuário da Nobreza de Portugal, III, 1985, Tomo II, pp. 758–761

Political offices
| Preceded by João Franco | Prime Minister of Portugal (President of the Council of Ministers); 1908 | Succeeded by Campos Henriques |
