= João Maria Ferreira do Amaral II =

Portuguese soldier

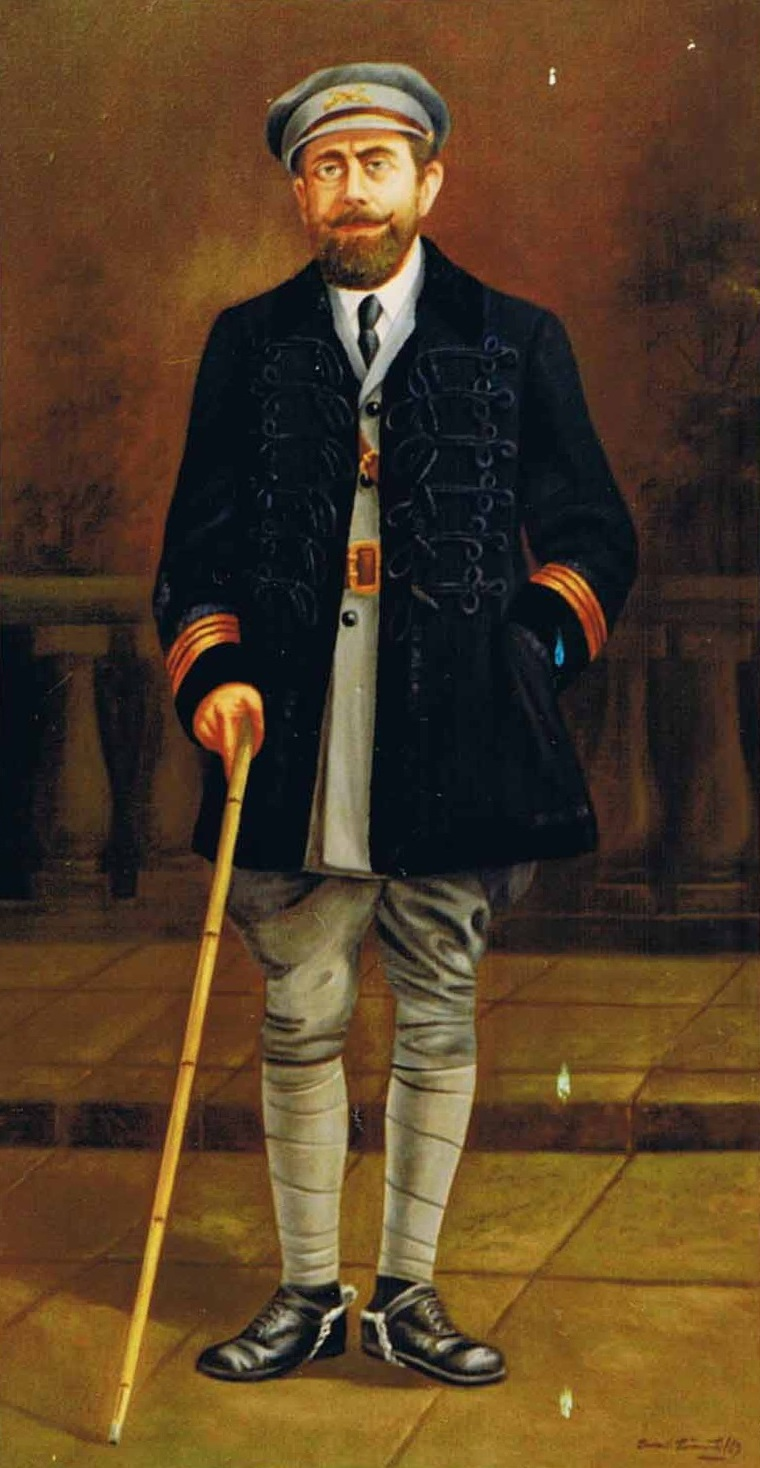
Portrait of Colonel Ferreira do Amaral, by Duarte Pimentel

João Maria Ferreira do Amaral, OTS, CC (14 June 1876 in Lisbon, São Julião – 11 March 1931 in Lisbon) was a Portuguese soldier.

== Ancestry ==
He was a natural son of Francisco Joaquim Ferreira do Amaral by Augusta Frederica Smith Chaves.

== Life ==
He was a Colonel of Infantry of the Portuguese Army, Commander of the Polícia de Segurança Pública, Officer of the Order of the Tower and Sword with Palm, Commander of the Order of Christ with Palm and Commander of the Legion of Honour, Croix de Guerre, etc., who fought in World War I.

== Marriage and issue ==
He married Maria Emília Carolina Tavares de Almeida Arez (Nova Goa, Goa, India, 3 May 1872 - 1923), daughter of José Joaquim Fernandes Arez, Engineer, and wife Dionísia Maria Tavares de Almeida, and widow of Mateus José Lapa Valente do Couto (Oeiras, 1861–1904), married Pangim, 12 February 1887, with one son, and had an only daughter:

- Lia Arez Ferreira do Amaral (Lisbon, Santa Isabel, 20 December 1914 - Oeiras, 1999), Licentiate in Historico-Philosophical Sciences, married Joaquim Cândido da Fonseca (1912 - Lisbon, 1977), Licentiate in Historico-Philosophical Sciences, former Vice-Dean of Oeiras High School, son of Manuel Cândido da Fonseca and wife Maria do Rosário Pires, and had female issue

== References and notes ==
- GeneAll.net - João Maria Ferreira do Amaral at www.geneall.net João Maria Ferreira do Amaral

== Sources ==
- Anuário da Nobreza de Portugal, III, 1985, Tomo II, pp. 758–761
