= List of University of Coimbra people =

This is a list of notable alumni and students, from the University of Coimbra.

== Alumni ==
=== Noted professors and lecturers ===
==== Nobel laureates ====
- Egas Moniz (1874–1955), physician and neurologist; 1949 Nobel Prize in Medicine or Physiology

==== Others ====
- José Bonifácio de Andrade e Silva (1763–1838), Brazilian statesman and naturalist
- Félix Avelar Brotero (1744–1828), botanist and professor
- George Buchanan (1506–1582), a Scottish historian and humanist scholar, professor at the Colegio de la Artes
- Luís Wittnich Carrisso (1886-1937), botanist, professor
- António Castanheira Neves (1929), legal philosopher and professor emeritus at the law faculty
- Fernão Lopes de Castanheda (1500–1559), historian, bedel and archivist
- Pedro de Castilho (1540–1615), bishop and viceroy of Portugal
- Jorge Manuel Miranda Dias, electrical engineer
- André de Gouveia (1497–1548), head teacher, humanist and pedagogue
- Alexandre Rodrigues Ferreira (1756–1815), naturalist
- Eduardo Lourenço (born 1923), professor, essayist, critic, philosopher, and writer
- Pedro Nunes (1502–1578), mathematician
- Sidónio Pais (1872–1918), politician; President in 1918; military; professor of mathematics
- Carlos Mota Pinto (1936–1985), Prime Minister
- António de Oliveira Salazar (1889–1970), politician; Prime Minister; Dictator of Portugal, 1932-1968
- Boaventura de Sousa Santos (born 1940), sociologist, professor and researcher
- Fernando Távora (1923–2004), architect and professor
- Domenico Vandelli (1735–1816), Italian naturalist

=== Noted attendees ===
Noted persons who graduated from or otherwise attended the university include:

- Zeca Afonso (1929–1987), singer, songwriter and poet; left-winger whose music is considered a symbol of the Carnation Revolution
- Manuel Alegre (1936), poet; politician; member of the Socialist Party (did not graduate)
- António José de Almeida (1866–1929), politician, President, founder of Lisbon and Porto universities
- Nicolau Tolentino de Almeida (1740–1811), foremost Portuguese satirical poet of the 18th century
- José de Anchieta (1534–1597), jesuit missionary, apostle of Brazil, writer and poet
- José Alberto de Oliveira Anchieta (1832–1897), 19th century explorer and naturalist (did not graduate)
- Leão Ramos Ascensão (1903–1980), integralist politician and writer
- Manuela Azevedo (1970), singer
- João Botelho (1949), film director (did not graduate)
- Luís de Almeida Braga, (1890–1970), integralist politician and writer
- Teófilo Braga (1843–1924), politician, President, writer and playwright
- Luís Vaz de Camões, (c. 1524–1580), considered Portugal's greatest poet (did not graduate)
- Jorge Chaminé (b, 1956), baritone; Human Rights Medal from the UN; Goodwill Ambassador of Music in ME (Music in the Middle East)
- José Cid (1942), singer and composer (did not graduate)
- Christopher Clavius (1538–1612), German mathematician and astronomer; main architect of the modern Gregorian calendar
- Narana Coissoró (1933), lawyer and politician
- Fausto Correia (1951–2007), politician; member of the Portuguese Parliament and the Government of Portugal; member of the Parliament of the European Union
- João de Deus (1830–1896), poet (did not graduate)
- Bishop James Warren Doyle (1786–1834), Bishop of Kildare and Leighlin in Ireland, studied for his doctorate in Coimbra
- Vergílio Ferreira (1916–1996), writer and teacher
- Armindo Freitas-Magalhães (1966), psychologist and researcher, working on the psychology of the human smile
- Almeida Garrett (1799–1854), romanticist and writer
- Manuel Teixeira Gomes (1860–1941), political figure (did not graduate)
- Ruy Luís Gomes (1905–1984), mathematician
- João Mário Grilo (1958), film director (did not graduate)
- José A.F.O. Correia (1984), Portuguese researcher, professor and engineer
- Miguel Guedes (1972), musician, songwriter and singer
- Gregório de Matos e Guerra (1636-1696), poet and lawyer
- Bartolomeu de Gusmão (1685–1724), naturalist, recalled for his early work on lighter-than-air ship design
- Hipólito da Costa (1774–1823), creator of Correio Braziliense and father of the Brazilian press
- Alfredo Augusto das Neves Holtreman, 1st Viscount of Alvalade, lawyer and businessman who was the first president of Sporting Clube de Portugal
- Artur Jorge (1946), football coach and former football player (did not graduate at this university but at the University of Lisbon)
- Guerra Junqueiro (1850–1923), lawyer, politician, member of the Portuguese House of Representatives, journalist, author and poet
- Valentim Loureiro (1938), military major, politician, mayor, former football club chairman (did not graduate)
- Fábio Lucindo (1985-), Brazilian voice actor, best-known for his work in anime.
- Bernardino Machado (1851–1944), politician, President
- Marquês de Pombal (1699–1782), Prime Minister to King Joseph I of Portugal throughout his reign
- Aristides Sousa Mendes (1885–1954), diplomat, known for protecting European Jews as a consul in France during World War II against government orders
- Luís Marques Mendes, (1957), politician; former leader of the Social Democratic Party
- Manoel da Nóbrega, (1517–1570), jesuit priest; first Provincial of the Society of Jesus in colonial Brazil; influential in the early history of Brazil; participated in the founding of several cities
- António Nobre (1867–1900), poet (did not graduate)
- Adriano Correia de Oliveira (1942–1982), musician, famous singer and composer of politically engaged folk music in the 1960s-70s (did not graduate)
- Carlos de Oliveira (1921–1981), poet and novelist
- Álvaro Santos Pereira (1972), economist and professor
- Guilhermina Prata (born 1952), lawyer and politician
- Eça de Queiroz (1845–1900), novelist, one of the leading intellectuals of the Generation of 1870
- Antero de Quental (1842–1891), poet, philosopher, political activist
- José Hipólito Raposo (1885–1953), integralist politician and writer
- José Adriano Pequito Rebelo (1892–1983), integralist politician and writer
- Maria de Belém Roseira (1949), politician (member of the Socialist Party, former minister)
- António de Almeida Santos (1926), politician and minister
- Fernando Machado Soares (1930), fado singer, author, judge
- António Tavares (born 1960), author and journalist
- Miguel Torga, pseudonym of Adolfo Correia da Rocha (1907–1995), writer, poet and physician
- Maria de Jesus Trovoada (1961), politician and geneticist.
- João Maria Tudela (1929), singer, musician and entertainer (did not graduate)
- Salgado Zenha (1923–1993), left-wing politician and lawyer
- Luís Simões da Silva (1962), Portuguese researcher, professor and engineer
- Sam Hou Fai (1962), Chief Executive of the Macao Special Administrative Region of the People's Republic of China
