= Monarchy of the North =

Monarchist state in northern Portugal (January–February 1919)

Kingdom of Portugal Reino de Portugal (Portuguese)
- 1919
- Flag Coat of arms
- Anthem: Hino da Carta ("Anthem of the Charter")
- Status: Unrecognized state
- Capital: Porto (de facto)
- Common languages: Portuguese
- Religion: Roman Catholicism
- Government: Constitutional monarchy (claimed)
- Monarch
  - 1919: Manuel II of Portugal (claimed)
- President of the Junta
  - 1919: Paiva Couceiro
- Historical era: Interwar period
  - Proclamation of Restoration: 19 January 1919
  - Termination of Restoration: 14 February 1919
- Currency: Portuguese real (claimed), Portuguese Escudo (de jure)
| Preceded by | Succeeded by |
| Portuguese First Republic | Portuguese First Republic |

The Monarchy of the North (Portuguese: Monarquia do Norte), officially the Kingdom of Portugal (Reino de Portugal), was a short-lived counter-revolution against the First Portuguese Republic and a monarchist government that was established in Northern Portugal in early 1919. It was based in Porto and lasted from 19 January to 13 February 1919. The movement is also known by the derogatory term Kingdom of Traulitânia (Reino da Traulitânia). (Note: Traulitânia means roughly “hooligan, trouble-maker, rowdy person” and has, for example, more recently been used to describe soccer hooligans.)

The movement was led by Henrique Mitchell de Paiva Couceiro, a prominent member of the Portuguese imperial government, without any sanction from the deposed King of Portugal, Manuel II. Paiva Couceiro, who had led and participated in many previous attempts at restoring the Portuguese monarchy, stated that the revolution was necessary because "if the North does not agree with the South, I will be, until the end, on the side of the faithful to tradition".

The revolution's inability to gain strong popular support throughout the country, coupled with its unorganized structure, led to its quick demise and the re-establishment of the Portuguese republican regime in the north.

== Background ==
The North of Portugal has often been the historical setting for revolutions and revolts against the position of the Portuguese government, from the Liberal Revolution of 1820, which went against the absolutist government, to the Republican Revolt of 1891, which went against the monarchist government. However, the North has also been the traditional seat of the Portuguese nobility.

When the 5 October 1910 revolution deposed King Manuel II of Portugal, the Portuguese monarchy, which traced its roots back to 868, was supplanted by the First Portuguese Republic. King Manuel II and the royal family, now banished from Portuguese soil, fled from Ericeira into exile, first to Gibraltar and then to the United Kingdom, where the British monarch gave them refuge.

After the revolution, King Manuel II and many others expected the quick downfall of the newly installed republican regime, as it was installed without much popular support. Though King Manuel II was ready to reassume his rightful throne, he stressed the importance of restoration through diplomacy and elections, not force.

On 3 October 1911, Paiva Couceiro commanded the first counter-republican revolt after the revolution, the first monarchist incursion into the northern city of Chaves. The monarchist forces raised the blue and white flag of the monarchy at the city hall and held the city for three days, but retreated when republican forces marched towards the city.

== Chaves attack ==
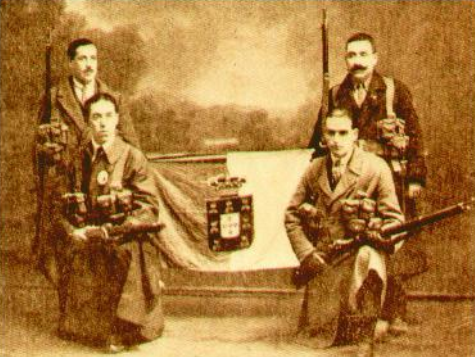
Monarchist counter-revolutionary soldiers holding the flag of the monarchy after the capture of Porto.

Though the first monarchist incursion into Chaves (1911) had failed, Paiva Couceiro regrouped with his supporters across the border in Galicia to launch a second, more powerful attempt on the city with much more supplies and support. The rebels received unofficial aid from Spain, which feared that the radical republican policies of the First Portuguese Republic would cross the border into Spain, where the monarchy stood precariously.

In total, about 450 men, both civilian and military, joined the monarchist revolt, and more volunteers and supporters were expected to join the movement as it made its way through the countryside. By the time the monarchist forces reached Chaves, on 8 July 1912, approximately 700 men were planned to take the city for the monarchy, but the incursion lacked the large amounts of public support that Paiva Couceiro had expected, being cheered on mainly by pacifist priests and noblemen who could not support the movement on a military basis.

By the time the monarchist forces made their way into the city proper, 150 local volunteers, with brief training, had organized themselves to protect the city in the name of the republican regime, while a company of 100 soldiers from the Portuguese Army marched towards the city.

Though the monarchist forces had superior numbers, they lacked the supplies that the 100 regular soldiers brought and by the end of the attack, 30 monarchists were killed and the rest either fled into exile or were arrested.

Though the royalist attack on Chaves was a failure for monarchist forces, it laid the ground for what would become the Monarchy of the North, in that it demonstrated that monarchists were prepared to use military force.

== Proclamation of Restoration ==
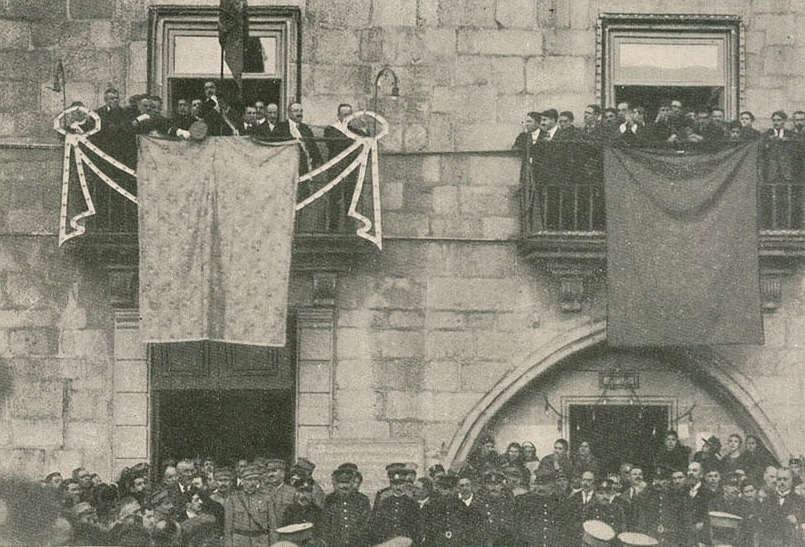
Proclamation of the Restoration of the Kingdom of Portugal, in Viana do Castelo, on 19 January 1919.

On 15 January 1919, Prime Minister Tamagnini Barbosa took control of the Portuguese republican government and made João do Canto e Castro President of the Portuguese Republic, filling the position after the assassination of Sidónio Pais.

Sidonists, supporters of the assassinated president, gathered under the command of General Almeida and formed the Provisional Military Junta outside of Lisbon, in opposition to President Canto e Castro. Similarly in the North of Portugal, Sidonists formed the Governing Military Junta, which proclaimed to control the North under provisional circumstances.

Taking advantage of the turmoil caused by President Sidónio Pais' assassination and replacement, Paiva Couceiro quickly made his way to North of Portugal, where he assessed that the setting was conducive to the restoration of the monarchy, to meet with the monarchist central command. The Integralismo Lusitano Central Junta met on 17 January 1919, where António Maria de Sousa Sardinha and Luís Carlos de Lima e Almeida Braga decided to proceed with Paiva Couceiro's plan of taking Porto, with the intention was to cut-off Porto from Lisbon and thereby foster unanimity for a restoration of the Portuguese monarchy.

Although António Sardinha and Paiva Couceiro marched into Porto, without any resistance from local military or citizens, on the morning of the 18 January, it was not until the following day (after a military parade) that a formal ceremony that included the hoisting of the blue and white royal flag proclaimed the Monarchy of the North. Following the proclamation of the restoration of the monarchy, the blue and white flag was hoisted at government buildings throughout the North, from Viana do Castelo to the historically contested city of Chaves.

It was Pequito Rebelo who, in the pages of Nação Portuguesa (1st series), on the eve of the Great War, outlined a synthesizing framework for the integralist project, in its various domains, by establishing the distinction between the Democratic Republic and the Integral Monarchy as the type of political, economic, and social regime of the new traditionalism. The essential features of this dichotomy: to the supposed popular sovereignty, he opposed the nation organized and hierarchized according to tradition; to universal suffrage, he opposed the corporate representation (and corporatism constituted the central element of his alternative to liberalism) of the traditional nuclei: the family, the municipalities, and the professions; to Parliament, he opposed a National Assembly representing those "living forces," with a consultative and technical character; to the centralization of the liberal State, he opposed anti-cosmopolitan and ruralizing decentralization. Pequito Rebelo defined the Integral Monarchy as the “regime in which political and social authorities coexist within their respective autonomies, unified by a supreme power whose organ is a hereditary king and having as its end the hierarchy of all social ends, subordinated to the national interest”.

— Artur Ferreira Coimbra, PAIVA COUCEIRO E A CONTRA-REVOLUÇÃO MONÁRQUICA (1910-1919)

During his brief activity, it was restored the Constitutional Charter of 1826 as a compromise with the liberal conservatives, as the priority was to abolish all republican legislation enacted since October 5, 1910, restore the monarchical flag and anthem, and to legislate intensely against republicans. However, the main objective was the return of the Integral and Traditional Monarchy based in Medieval political philosophy, Catholic social teaching, and corporate representativity.

== Monsanto assault ==
After the events in Porto, on the 24th of January, the government of João Tamagnini Barbosa called the population to arms against the Monarchy and provided them with weapons and training. This was particularly important because the garrison in Lisbon declared neutrality. On the evening of 22 January, a group of monarchist military and citizens led by Aires de Ornelas and Álvaro de Mendonça gathered on the Monsanto hill (nowadays a forest park). They made their local proclamation of the Monarchy and hoisted the monarchist flag. A republican citizen militia gathered in Edward VII Park and, along with some members of the National Republican Guard, the Fiscal Guard, and of the military and navy, marched towards Monsanto. On the morning of 23 January, the two forces met and the republican troops besieged the monarchist rebels. An attack by the republicans on 24 January afternoon resulted in the defeat of the monarchist forces, who surrendered around 5 p.m. The Monsanto assault led to the resignation of João Tamagnini Barbosa on 26 January and a union government led by José Relvas.

== Monarchical support ==
The government was run without any sanction from the deposed King of Portugal, Manuel II.

== Demise ==
The revolution's inability to gain strong popular support anywhere in the rest the country, coupled with its unorganized structure, led to its quick demise and the re-establishment of the republican regime in the north.

On 13 February 1919, a revolt in Porto by civilians and National Republican Guard members leads to the end of the Monarchy of the North.

== Bibliography ==
- Diário da Junta Governativa do Reino de Portugal. Colecção Completa, nº 1 (19 Jan 1919) – nº 16 (13 Fev 1919), Porto, J. Pereira da Silva, 1919.
- Felix Correia, A Jornada de Monsanto – Um Holocausto Tragico, Lisboa, Tip. Soares & Guedes, Abril de 1919.
- A Questão Dinástica – Documentos para a História mandados coligir e publicar pela Junta Central do Integralismo Lusitano, Lisboa, Empresa Nacional de Indústrias Graficas, 1921.
- Luís de Magalhães, “Porque restaurámos a Carta em 1919”, Correio da Manhã, 27 e 28 de Fevereiro de 1924.
- Luís de Magalhães, Perante o Tribunal e a Nação, Coimbra, 1925.
- Hipólito Raposo, Folhas do meu Cadastro, Volume I (1911-1925), Edições Gama, 1940.
- António Sardinha, "Conrado não guarda silêncio!" em António Rodrigues Cavalheiro, Um Inédito de António Sardinha sobre a Monarquia do Norte, Separata do nº 15-16 da revista Sulco (2ª Série), Lisboa, 1968, pp. 43–55.
- José Manuel Quintas, "Os combates pela bandeira azul e branca", História, nº 10, Janeiro de 1999.
- Redacção Quidnovi, com coordenação de José Hermano Saraiva, História de Portugal, Dicionário de Personalidades, Volume VIII, Ed. QN-Edição e Conteúdos, S.A., 2004
