= Alberto Monsaraz =

Portuguese politician and poet (1889–1959)

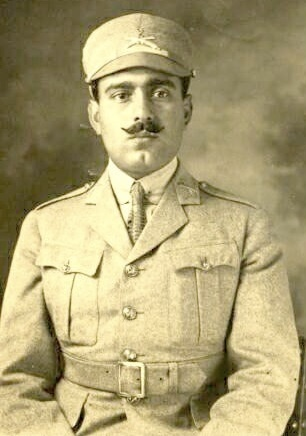
Alberto Monsaraz

Alberto de Morés Monsaraz (28 February 1889, Lisbon – 23 January 1959) was a Portuguese politician and poet. He was one of the central figures in the Integralismo Lusitano that dominated the far-right of Portuguese politics during the early years of the twentieth century.

== Early years ==
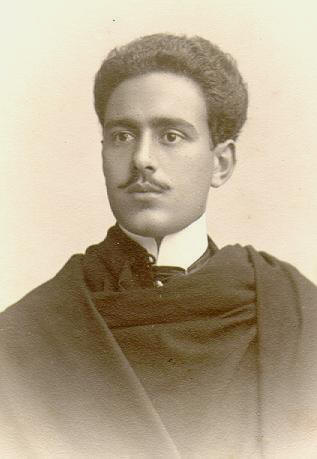
Alberto Monsaraz as a student in Coimbra

Born in Lisbon, he was the son of the poet António de Macedo Papança, who became the first Conde de Monsaraz in 1910. In 1907 the young Monsaraz began studying law whilst also writing for the right-wing journal Pátria Nova. As a result of his involvement in monarchist politics it would be 1915 before he finally graduated.

== Integralism ==
Like many young monarchists at the time Monsaraz fell in behind Henrique Mitchell de Paiva Couceiro and took part in his monarchist incursion in 1911. He was exiled to Paris for his involvement and fell in with other like-minded individuals in the French capital who had also been expelled from Portugal. He was the founder of Integralismo Lusitano in 1914 along with José Hipólito Raposo, José Adriano Pequito Rebelo and António Sardinha. Independently wealthy due to coming from a leading family, Monsaraz was involved in funding a number of journals associated with the new movement, including Nação Portuguesa, Ideia Nacional and A Monarquista.

Monsaraz took part in Paiva Couceiro's second rebellion of 1919 but was wounded in this conflict and lost a kidney, a fact that impaired his health for the rest of his life. Nonetheless he continued his involvement in Integralism and sat on the Junta Central of the movement. He would become closely associated with Luís de Almeida Braga in their support for Duarte Nuno, Duke of Braganza. The issue of succession proved a divisive one, with different elements within the movement supporting different candidates for the throne, and in 1925 Monsaraz resigned from the Junta Central as part of these problems.

== National Syndicalism ==
Following his resignation Monsaraz began to read the works of Georges Sorel and his disciple Georges Valois and soon became converted to national syndicalism as a result. He went on to become a leading figure in the Movimento Nacional-Sindicalista, becoming Secretary-General of the blue-shirted movement in 1933. However Monsaraz was exiled to Republican Spain along with Francisco Rolão Preto in 1935 when António de Oliveira Salazar stepped up his persecution of the National Syndicalists.

== Later years ==
Monsaraz initially became even stronger in his national syndicalism and for a brief spell looked to Nazism, declaring Adolf Hitler to be his political idol. However this fervour did not last long and by 1936, when he returned to Portugal, Monsaraz had come full circle and was once again advocating Integralism. He remained a strong critic of Salazar, refusing to even mention his name and instead referring to him as "the orator of Sala do Risco", although by this time Monsaraz's political influence had all but ended.
