= Henrique Mitchell de Paiva Cabral Couceiro =

19/20th-century Portuguese soldier, colonial governor, and politician

His Excellency Artillery colonel Henrique de Paiva Couceiro
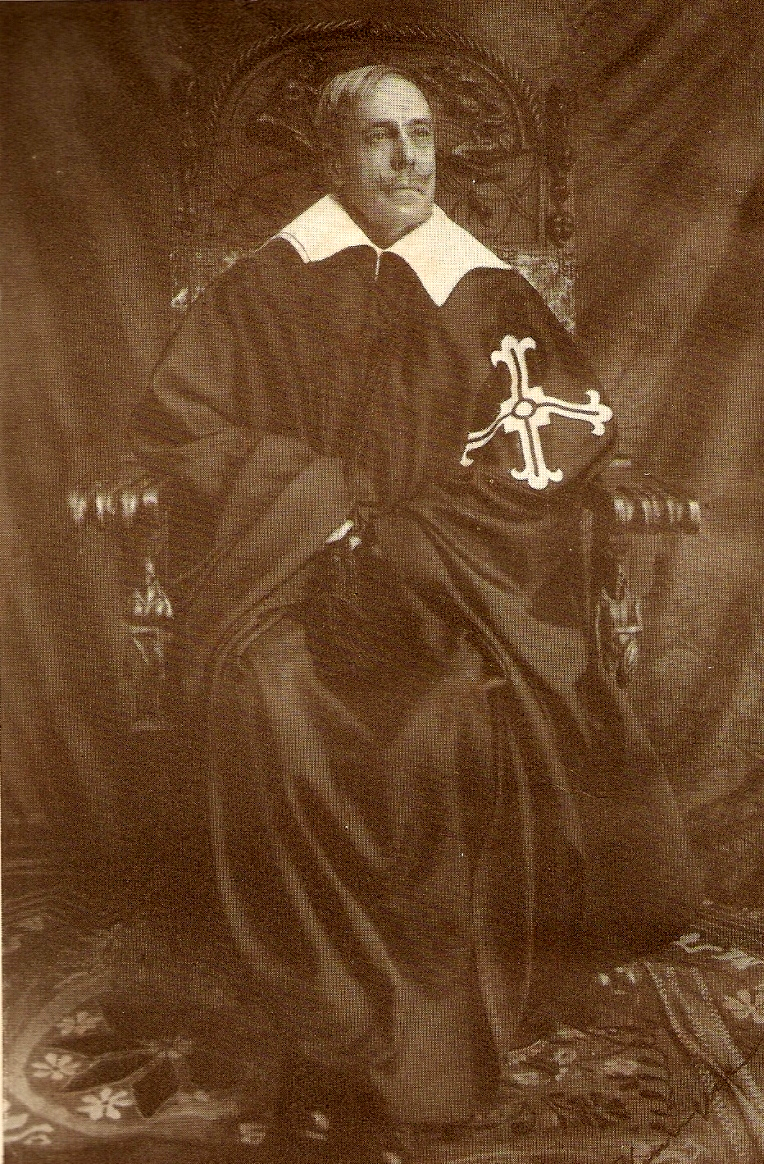
- Henrique Mitchell de Paiva Couceiro in the robes of the Order of Aviz

President of the Government Junta of the Kingdom of Portugal (Disputed)
- In office 19 January 1919 – 14 February 1919
- Monarch: Manuel II

Governor-General of Angola
- Interim; 24 May 1907 – 22 July 1909
- Monarchs: Carlos I Manuel II
- Prime Minister: João Franco; Francisco Ferreira do Amaral; Artur de Campos Henriques; Sebastião Teles; Venceslau de Lima
- Minister of the Navy and Overseas: Aires de Ornelas; Augusto de Castilho; António Ferreira Cabral Pais do Amaral; João António de Azevedo Coutinho Fragoso de Sequeira; Manuel da Terra Pereira Viana
- Preceded by: pt:Ernesto Augusto Gomes de SousaErnesto Augusto Gomes de Sousa
- Succeeded by: Álvaro António da Costa Ferreira

Personal details
- Born: 30 December 1861 Lisbon, Kingdom of Portugal
- Died: 11 February 1944 (aged 82) Lisbon, Portuguese Republic
- Parent(s): José Joaquim de Paiva Cabral Couceiro (father); Helena Isabel Teresa Mitchell (mother)
- Nickname(s): The Paladin; The Great Lightning

Military service
- Allegiance: Kingdom of Portugal
- Branch/service: Portuguese Royal Army
- Years of service: 14 January 1879 – 14 February 1919
- Rank: Artillery colonel
- Battles/wars: Campaigns of Pacification and Occupation
- Awards: Military Valor Medal MOVM

Henrique Mitchell de Paiva Cabral Couceiro (30 December 1861, in Lisbon – 11 February 1944, in Lisbon) was a Portuguese soldier, colonial governor, monarchist politician and counter-revolutionary; he was notable for his role during the colonial occupation of Angola and Mozambique and for his dedication to the Monarchist Cause during the period of the First Portuguese Republic through the founding of the Monarchy of the North.

== Early life ==
He was born to José Joaquim de Paiva Cabral Couceiro, a notable engineer in the Portuguese Army and Helena Isabel Teresa Mitchell, an Irish Protestant who converted to Catholicism (after being educated in a convent in France). Following her widowed father's death, the 20-year-old Helena Mitchell worked for a time in Madrid, before taking residence in Portugal as the governess to the Viscount do Torrão's children. It was as the children's teacher that she met the engineer José Couceiro and later married, giving birth to two daughters (Carolina and Conceição) and their only son Henrique.

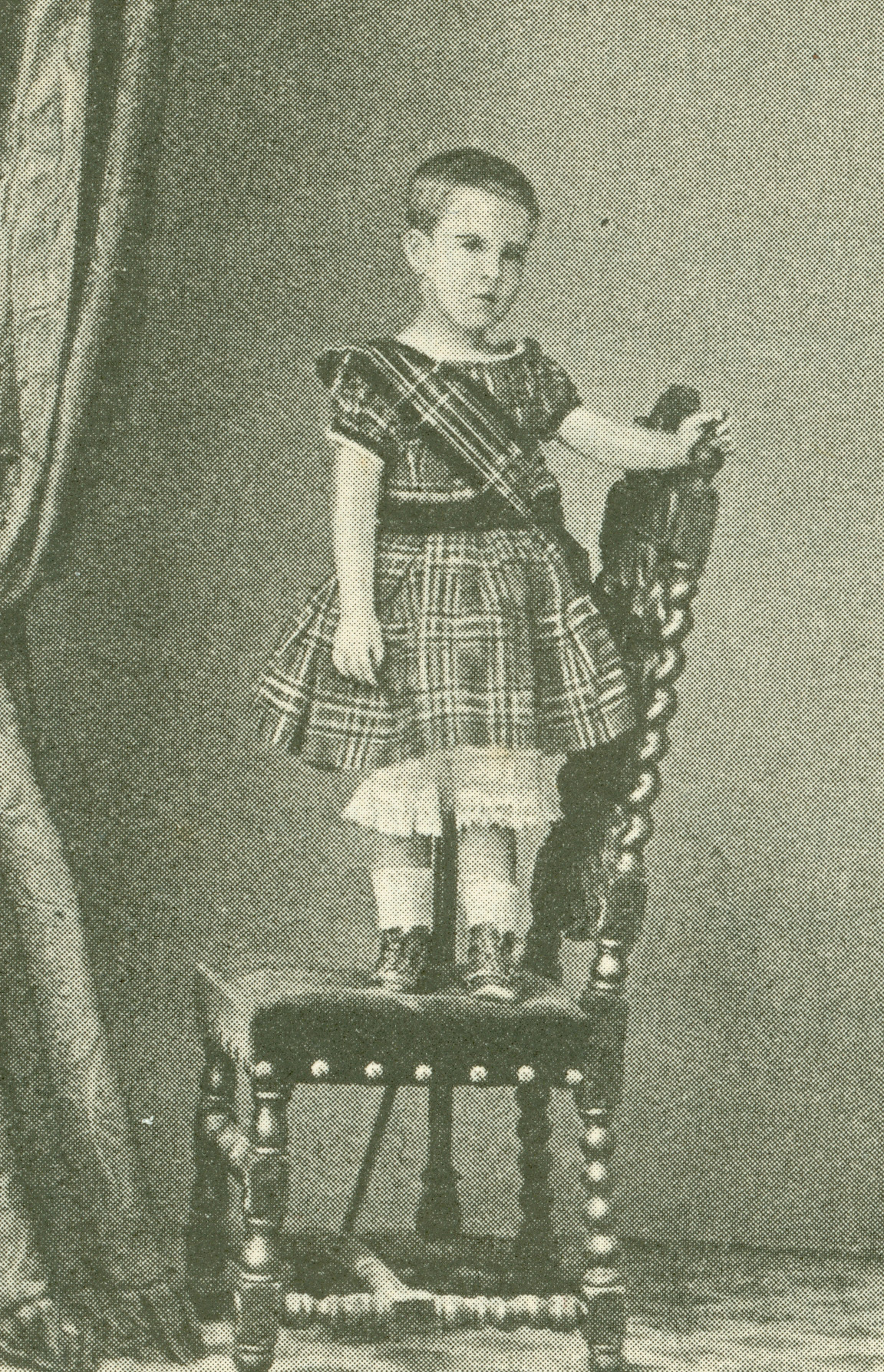
Henrique at the age of 4 years; 1865.

Helen Mitchell was a militant Catholic, and the young José was raised in a strict authoritarian environment, where he read little of the popular literature, never went to the theater, attended mass daily and similarly read Imitação de Cristo daily in preparation of the "ultimate sacrifice". Similarly, his life was quite regimented: he went to sleep at 11 and woke at 6 in the morning, fenced for an hour, went to mass, had two hours training on horseback daily, and regularly shined his boots, brushed his suits and cleaned most of his personal items. Helena Mitchell instilled in her son a religious zeal and military regime; at the age of 11 she gave him a copy of the History of the Crusades, Ivanhoe and he read and re-read a copy of Don Quixote, while fostering ethos of the medieval knight: austerity, valor, abstinence, service to God and to country.

=== Military academy ===
Destined by family-upbringing to join the military, after concluding his preparatory studies in Lisbon (January 14, 1879), at 17 years of age, he volunteered for service in the 2nd Cavalry's Royal Lancers Regiment, a position that he served in until 1880. At that time he transferred to the 1st Artillery Regiment, and enrolled in the Military Academy at the Escola Politécnica de Lisboa ("Polytechnic University of Lisbon"), where he studied artillery between 1881 and 1884 as an officer candidate.

On June 24, 1881, at 19 years of age, on the eve of being promoted to ensign, he fired five shots from his service revolver wounding Luís Léon de la Torre. The attack, which occurred in the Chiado area of Lisbon, was provoked by a shoulder bump against the defendant which provoked an insulting and offensive profanity to [Couceiro's] dignity. For this simple insult, which in the eyes of Paiva Couceiro was without sufficient reason, he drew his Army revolver and fired five shots (three that actually hit) into the victim. In October, Couceiro responded to the charges of the Council of War to the crimes of attempted murder and the use of a prohibited weapon. In a unanimous decision, the council did not find attempted murder charges had been proven, but yet sentenced him to two years in a military prison, later (on April 7, 1882) to be commuted to six months in addition to time served. He was summarily released from the military prison at the Fort of São Julião da Barra on October 7 and returned to the Military Academy (on October 26, 1882).

The events of his imprisonment did not affect his career; on January 9, 1884, he was promoted to second-lieutenant in artillery and served in the venerable 1st Artillery Regiment in Campolide, Lisbon. While there, he joined a group of young officers who practiced the "military arts" of that period, that included fencing and riding. He was later promoted to second-lieutenant (on January 27, 1886), and finally to captain (on July 4, 1889), wherein he volunteered for a commission in the Portuguese colonies in Africa (a consequence of the Berlin Conference that divided sections of Africa between European states).

== Military ==
=== Angolan campaign (1889–1891) ===
Paiva Couceiro arrived in Luanda, Angola on September 1, 1889, and was immediately appointed commander of the Irregular Cavalry Squadron in the village of Humpata (which was originally created by Artur de Paiva to combat bands of guerrillas along the plain of Moçâmedes). He did not remain at this outpost for long; apparently he was unsatisfied with his subordinates, their methods and inferior level of discipline, but was able to utilize them in a campaign to retrieve missing cattle, instead of hiring local Boer mercenaries, which had been the custom. By January he was in the village of Belmonte, in Bié, on a mission that took him along the Cuando River, to Cuito and then to the Lialui along the Zambezi River (a trek of thousands of kilometers across savannah), in order to negotiate with Lewanika, chief of the Barotze tribe. The growth of the Portuguese occupation force in the Angolan interior was part of the administration's attempted to implement their Pink Map to explore and expand their serfdom over the peoples of the central-African interior. After some resistance, the colonial administration began a military campaign to pacify groups that had resisted initial token gestures of friendship and gifts, a process that Paiva Couceiro participated in energetically. For the chief's recognition of Portuguese sovereignty over his territories, Paiva Couceiro brought with him a colonels tunic and sword, textiles, gold, velvet, boxes of Porto wine and arms, which were to be delivered in 300 crates when the Governor of Angola canceled the project.

This was a consequence of the 1890 British Ultimatum that removed all Portuguese imperial illusions to sovereignty in south-central Africa, and made the trip dangerous and useless. Couceiro himself dropped the use of "Mitchell" from his name out of spite. Meanwhile, he visited the Vila Teixeira da Silva, colonial outpost in Bailundo, site of two Protestant missions (one English, the other American) and where the Portuguese explorer António da Silva Porto lived. Arriving with 40 heavily armed soldiers from Mozambique he constructed an outpost and intimidated the local tribe (fearful of them constructing a fort in the area). After some time, unimpressed with Couceiro's reasons and mindful of the existing hostility between England and Portugal, the chief Dunduma sent Couceiro his own ultimatum. Familiar with the local tribes, the explorer Silva Porto was convinced to defuse the tensions. But his personal failure to resolve the conflict, and suffering from a loss of dignity and honor from the confrontation with the chief, and from a general pessimism associated with the British Ultimatum, caused Silva Porto to wrap himself in a Portuguese flag and attempt suicide by lighting several barrels of explosives.

After Silva Porto's death, Paiva Couceiro and his troops installed themselves briefly in Belmonte, but surrounded by forces of the chief of Bié, he was forced to withdraw to Bailundo. After remaining along the road to Cambane, he received orders from Governor General Guilherme de Brito Capelo to follow the Angolan arm of the Okavango River to Mucusso (a trip of 2,600 km over uncharted lands), determine the navigability of the river and enforce the sovereignty of Portugal (which was under threat from English forces). His caravan began its journey on April 30, 1890, and included an interpreter (Joaquim Guilherme Gonçalves), ten Mozambican soldiers, three quartermasters and 90 attendants, who traveled into areas occupied by 16 chiefs with different cultures and in environments that had, until then, not been visited by Europeans. There voyage ended on July 30 in the village of the chief of the Mucusso tribe. But, they resolved to continue their exploration to the islands of Gomar, 65 kilometers away, and returned by river until the Fort of Princesa Amélia, in Bié (arriving on October 14 after five months). His expedition earned him the title of Knight of the Order of the Tower and Sword on December 18, 1890.

On returning to Bié, he joined with Artur de Paiva's Irregular Cavalry Squadron in the punitive expedition to arrest chief Dunduma (or N’Dunduma), who had given him the ultimatum six months earlier. Artur Paiva brought with him 300 indigenous tribesmen, 70 Boer mercenaries, Portuguese volunteers and a group of auxiliaries made up of Zulu and Damaran peoples. After 30 days of bombardments and attacks, the Barotze surrendered their chief. On terminating this operation he was charged with subjugation of the region of Caranganja and to explore the deposits of salt along the eastern margin of the Cuanza River (wherein he produced detailed reports on the 12-day 453-kilometer expedition).

At the end of this campaign he returned to Belmonte, with a fever. Owing to his condition, on February 17, 1891, the Minister of the Navy terminated his commission and ordered him to return to Lisbon. In honor of his service, the people of the region of Belmonte-Cuito-Benguela gave him a diamond-studded replica of his Order of the Tower and Sword knighthood. Received in Lisbon, he was honored for his military activities and for opening up the Angolan interior, for which he received the title of Grand Officer in the Order of the Tower and Sword (on May 29, 1891).

=== Mozambique campaign (1891–1896) ===
His award did not include a promotion, and after a short time in Lisbon, he was detached to the 3rd Artillery Regiment in Santarém where he remained between August 1891 and August 1892. He returned to the 1st Artillery Regiment in Lisbon after this experience. Generally unhappy with life in Lisbon, he requested a temporary assignment transfer to the Spanish Foreign Legion, which was in service in Melilla during the Battle of the Riff mountains, in Morocco. He distinguished himself, receiving the Spanish Military Merit Medal, but returned once again to Lisbon at the end of his tour; once again undeserving of a promotion, he rejoined the 1st Artillery Regiment. Paiva Couceiro was vaguely occupied with a daughter of a Count in Valencia in summer 1894.

In October 1894, the Tsonga tribe in southern Mozambique rebelled and attacked the local community of Lourenço Marques (later Maputo). The Portuguese Regenerator government of Ernesto Hintze Ribeiro appointed former Progressive Party minister António Enes to the title of Royal Commissioner in Mozambique, with the mission to crush the revolt and reaffirm Portuguese sovereignty (in the face of British threats from Cecil Rhodes, who considered the Portuguese incapable of maintaining the territory). Due to his fame in Angola, Paiva Couceiro was invited (and accepted on December 8, 1894) the title of aide-de-camp, and between January 18, 1895, and May he was joined in Mozambique by Alfredo Augusto Freire de Andrade, Aires de Ornelas, Eduardo da Costa and Joaquim Augusto Mouzinho de Albuquerque, along with the local commander major Alfredo Augusto Caldas Xavier. Upon arriving the contingent encountered a majority of local tribes (that included the Tongas, Batongas, Machopes and the Vátuas) against the Portuguese, encircling Lourenço Marques, and occupying the island of Xefina.

António Enes's initial strategy was to occupy Marracuene from which they would impose order and re-take control of their domains. On January 21, 1895, a column left Lourenço Marques to patrol a distance of 15 kilometers. Paiva Couceiro, with a vanguard of thirteen mounted-cavalry, distanced themselves from the column and were attacked by Tonga tribesmen, which they repelled. A month later, while attempting to rendezvous with the "friendly" Matola and Moamba tribes (which never appeared), Paiva Coucerio's detachment of 37 officers and 791 soldiers (that included 300 Angolans) were attacked on the morning of February 2. There was confusion in the Angolan ranks and the lines broke, but Couceiro and the other officers were able to rebuild the ranks. Between 4 and 8 Portuguese soldiers and 20 Angolans, while 200 Tongas were killed in the battle. The column remained in the field for three days, and on March 5 they marched into Amboane and then Lourenço Marques on March 6 (where they remained for a month).

In another demonstration of his violent tendencies, while in Lourenço Marques he assaulted three journalists (two British and an American) who he believed were hostile to Portuguese interests, which he was publicly reprimanded by António Enes for.

Enes, and his cabinet, were meanwhile working on a methodical plan to reestablish the dominion of the "King's lands"; he began with occupying the islands at the mouth of the Komati River (Xefina Grande, on February 29, and Xefina Pequena), while Freire de Andrade fortified Marracuene and on the first days of April, Caldas Xavier, devastated the island of Benguelene. On April 25, Freire de Andrade and Couceiro left Lourenço Marques with a column of 172 men and two cannons, to build a bridge over the River Incomati to the island of Incanine. After a number of accidents in May, the bridge was complete and a detachment of 400 men headed by the officers entered the Magaia in the direction of Mapungo which the Portuguese sacked and burned. Similarly, on April 18, the detachment destroyed Macaneta, home of a tribe headed by a European educated local named Finish. These attacks forced many of the locals to flee to the lands of Gaza, ruled by chief Gungunhana; as Couceiro wrote:

"With our victories we have won vassals, more prestige! What a cruel sarcasm: the populations emigrate from a liberal administrative territory and governed humanitarianly by the Cross and Law and gather in the corrals of the last wild patriarch aboriginal".

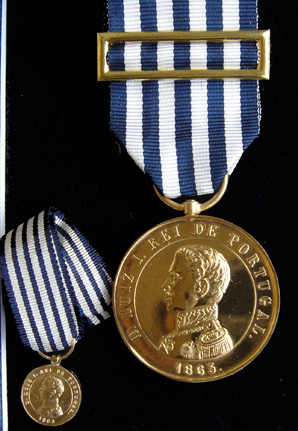
Gold Medal for Military Valor (D. Luiz I) – 1896

As a part of an overall plan to circle and defeat Gungunhana, Couceiro marched 270 Europeans, 50 Angolans, five cannons, and three rapid-firing guns to the southern border of Vátua lands in late June. Near the former fort of Stokolo, about 12 kilometers from the main road, Paiva Couceiro and Freire de Andrade built an outpost (Ponto X) and bridges without any conflict from the Cossine or Vátua tribes. On July 17, he recaptured the Portuguese outpost in Magude, and completed another bridge on July 24. Meanwhile, Enes was not having too much success in trying to encircle the tribal-lands of Gungunhana. He protested to him, through his intermediaries José Joaquim de Almeida and Aires de Ornelas, and requested he surrender rebels Mahazulo and Matibejana, as well as insisting that the chief accept two or three posts on his lands, in exchange for the immediate removal of Portuguese troops along his frontiers. Although Enes had been counseled against starting a war with Gungunhana, Couceiro and Freire de Andrade insisted, at the end of June, that they should advance towards Cossine (within the Vátua lands) and begin the war against the chief. This perturbed the chief; near Cossine were many Vátua tribesmen, and in Magul, the provisional base of Matibejana. On August 23, Paiva Couceiro received orders to attack and arrest the rebel Matibejana. He advanced with 1,000 men along the swampy river, while a contingent of auxiliaries pillaged the neighboring villages and massacred the inhabitants. What was later known as the Battle of Magul, demonstrated acts that were more cavalier than operationally strategic. Paiva Couceiro's contingent, once again, became separated from his colleague Freire de Andrade's column, and finding the tribes of Cossine exhorted an ultimatum to surrender the rebel Matibejana within three days. When this did not occur, and after several days of inactivity, the gathered tribesman attacked directly the Portuguese lines, which resisted with only 5 dead and 27 injured (the tribes lost 300–450 in total). Although not a strategic victory, it did establish Portuguese military supremacy and turned the tide of the Luso-African skirmishes For his actions, in August 1895, Paiva Couceiro was made Knight of the Order of São Bento de Avis, for his actions. Although he demonstrated extraordinary physical courage, he placed his forces in unnecessary harm, but was to become a celebrity and feted with local honors, particularly after the imprisonment of Gungunhana:

"We will see if the victory of Magul will be the defeat of Gungunhana; the defeat, probably, in the district of Lourenço Marques...if it wasn't for Paiva Couceiro, probably, we would lament even today the great disgrace."

At the conclusion of these operations, Paiva Couceiro left Lourenço Marques (December 18, 1895). Arriving in Lisbon in February 1896, he was proclaimed Benemérito da Pátria ("Honored of the Fatherland"), by unanimity of the Royal Court, recognized for his contribution to Gungunhana's later imprisonment he was made Commander of the Order of the Tower and Sword, and provided with an annual pension of 500$000 réis. In addition, he was made honorary adjunct-do-camp to King Carlos I of Portugal, integrated into the Royal Military House, and received the Gold Medal for military valor, and the Queen D. Amélia Silver Medallion for combat during the Mozambique campaign.

- Military Valor Medal (Gold) (MOVM) (Note: Portuguese: Medalha de Valor Militar – Grau Ouro – At the center of the ribbon, a national shield is placed, resting on a golden armillary sphere. Recipient is entitled to wear a Fourragère) (Portugal)

== Politics ==
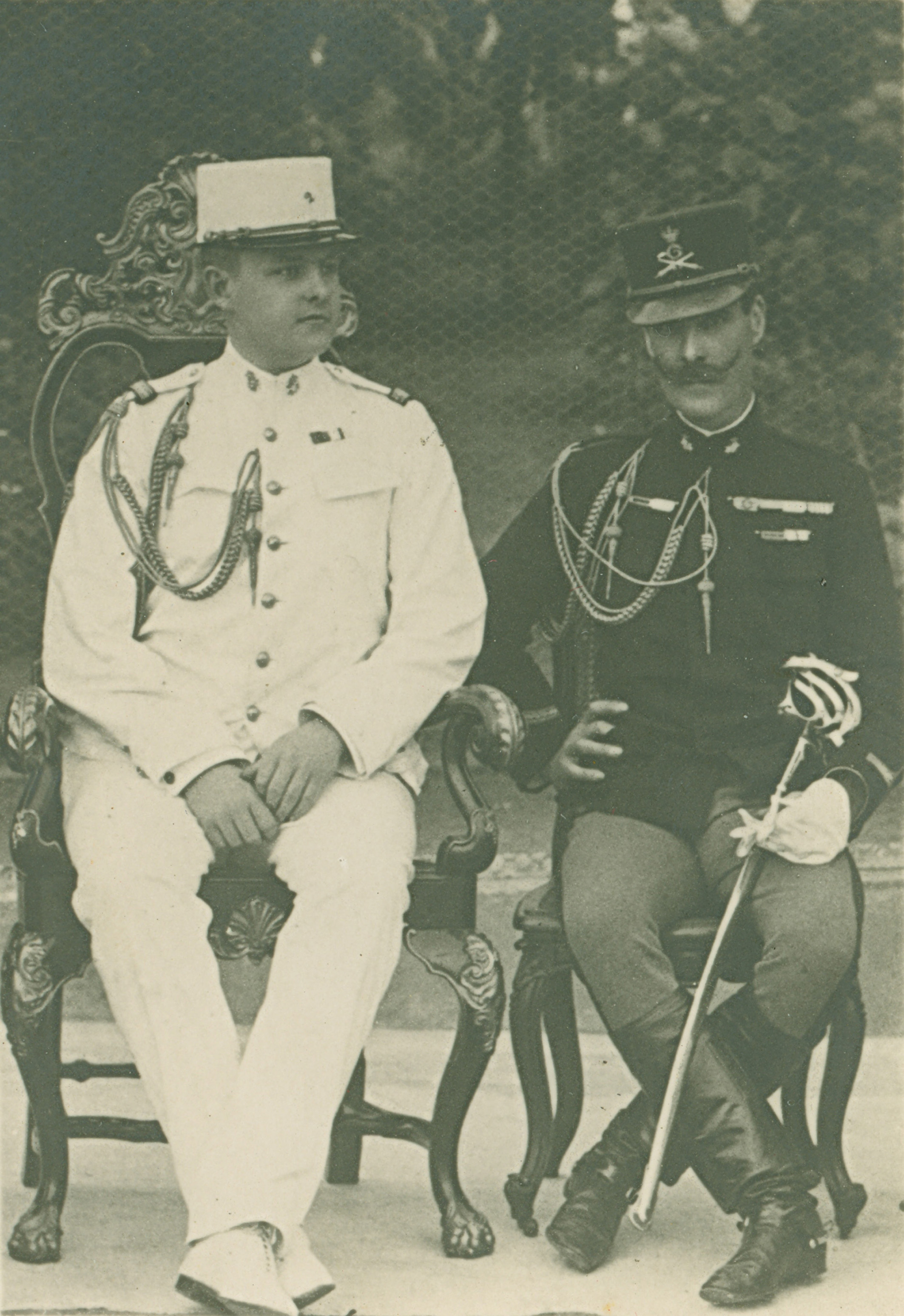
Paiva Couceiro (right) during an Angolan visit from Prince D. Luís Filipe, while Colonial Governor (Luanda 1907)

In 1898, Paiva Couceiro was transferred into a bureaucratic and administrative role within the armed forces hierarchy; he took part in discussions on Law 14, that dealt with the provisional creation of a 2nd Captain in Artillery, and also debated, with conviction, rapid promotions and better salaries for officers. In 1901, he was sent to Angola, with the mission of reporting on army mobility between the Lucala River and Malanje. His conclusions were presented in a report where he was preoccupied with the Portuguese colonial politics.

From here he repeatedly manifested a disdain for politics, considering it an "indignant swamp" to the honor of true Portuguese, and published numerous articles about colonial and national politics, revealing growing nationalism and anti-parliamentarianism against the rotating system of government in Portugal (which he referred to as the "decline of the Fatherland"). In interviews and public interjections, he assumed the role of Nuno Álvares Pereira, ready to "save" Portugal.

"Paiva Couceiro was, always, the literal synthesis of the Lusitanian descendant of Cid Campeador, the mystic Nun'Álvares, the nobleman of Guesclin"

His position was galvanized by the suicide of Joaquim Augusto Mouzinho de Albuquerque, a compatriot and hero of the Mozambique campaigns responsible for the surrender of Gungunhana, who was slowly destroyed by political intrigue. His political thoughts, imbued with nationalism and Catholicism, preceded in many ways the Integralismo Lusitano, which included the philosophies of Joaquim Pedro de Oliveira Martins and Guerra Junqueiro (who wrote Finis Patriae).

Assuming a moral stance, on April 1, 1902, he sent a "respectful petition" to the Royal Court, to decry the imposition of customs taxes on the state's creditors, to recommend a balanced budget and suggested reforms to the political system that guided the "nobleness and traditions" of the Portuguese populous. His letter was widely published in the press and was supported by right-wing monarchists, becoming the uncontested leader of the "Africanistas" (former African military or colonial nationals living in Portugal). Rafael Bordalo Pinheiro the author wrote the poem Paródia, to eulogize Couceiro. It was not long after his petition that a new scandal surfaced: in December 1902 António Teixeira de Sousa, the Minister of the Marines and Colonies in the Hintze Ribeiro government, negotiated a contract with Robert Williams (a Breton who the press referred to as the "disciple of Cecil Rhodes") to construct a rail-line to link Lobito and Benguela (in Mozambique) to the Congolese border, which guaranteed a 99-year transport monopoly and access to mineral exploration along an area 240 kilometers wide by 1,347 kilometres in length. The Williams Contract, as it was known, scandalized nationalists (who saw this as an exclusively Portuguese right); Paiva Couceiro declared that the ministers who sanctioned the accord were traitors.

His statements did not make any friends; notwithstanding his links to the Royal House, on December 6, 1902, he was transferred to the role of adjunct to the Inspecção do Serviço de Artilharia in Évora. This imposed exile lasted until November 1903, when the Progressita leader José Luciano de Castro, transferred to the Grupo de Baterias a Cavalo de Queluz, where he remained until 1906. But, while in Évora, he became familiar with João Franco and the Partido Regenerador-Liberal. A symbol of this approximation was the speech by João Franco in May 1903, where his ideas about colonial politics corresponded with Paiva Couceiro.

=== Elected politician (1906–07) ===
In 1905, after general elections on February 12 (37th Legislative Elections) and when it became clear the King Carlos I of Portugal resolved to finally support governmental reforms made by João Franco's government, Paiva Couveiro and other "Africanists" (such as Freire de Andrade, Aires de Ornelas, Ivens Ferraz and João Baptista Ferreira) decide to register as candidates in the Liberal Regenerator Party. The right-wing newspaper, Alamanque proclaimed of Paiva Couceiro "the nobility of his personage and immaculate candor...[was enough that the Portuguese] would never lose their confidence in the future of the race". He ran in the elections to the 39th Legislature (on August 19, 1906), representing the 15th district in eastern Lisbon (from 1906–1907). In 1906, he was a member of the Comissão Parlamentar do Ultramar ("Parliamentary Commission on Overseas Territories"); between 1806 and 1907, he sat on the Comissão Parlamentar de Administração Pública ("Parliamentary Commission on the Public Administration and also the Comissão Parlamentar da Guerra (Parliamentary Commission on War); his roles on these commission were initially in issues related to the colonies and the military, but grew to include opposition to progressive politics and to the support of issues that were clearly anti-democratic. When discussing the colonies, in particular Angola, he was very passionate, defending that the colonial was the unique resource to make this small Portugal large/important. His legislative career was cut short when, on May 2, 1907, the government leader João Franco, resolved to distance himself from the progressives and through the support of the King, he suspended the Parliament and governed as a dictator. As opposition republican and anarchist groups grew rapidly, Paiva Couceiro's politics became more radical: he advocated a traditional monarchial system that was anti-parliamentarian and without political parties.

He served, from 1907 to 1909, as the 89th Governor of Angola. His devotion to the monarchist cause earned him several periods of exile, both before and after the coming of the dictatorial New State (Estado Novo) of António Salazar (1933).

=== Colonial governor of Angola (1907–09) ===
On May 1, 1907, the Colonial governor of Angola, Eduardo Augusto Ferreira da Costa, died. Under the suggestion of King Carlos, the new Minister of the Navy, Aires de Ornelas, one of Paiva Couveiro's Africanist comrades, invited him to accept the prestigious colonial position; being a supporter of João Franco had helped his nomination. He accepted it on May 24, 1907, becoming the interim Colonial governor (since his title as Captain did not permit him to obtain the formal title immediately). He arrived in Luanda on June 17, 1907. His objectives were clear: occupy, explore and garrison the territory until the most remote frontiers, to guarantee security and prevent external interference; promote economic development in the colony, creating cheap, rapid communication to fix Portuguese colonists, providing local work for the indigenous and reducing the weight of protectionism and urban monopolies; and allow the local provincial government to resolve issues autonomously, without the interference of the central government. Although a difficult task, the period of his tenure was marked by progress: fact that was made clear by the following Colonial Governor, José Norton de Matos and confirmed by the historian René Pélissier During this period, in addition to public works, he personally commanded military campaigns to pacify the regions of the Cuamato tribe and municipality of Dembos (in Cuanza Norte). He was also responsible for diversifying the economy (90% of which was dependent on rubber and coffee), the expansion of railway lines and the advance into the interior territories.

After João Franco's government fell in 1908 (a victim of the events around the assassination of King D. Carlos and his heir Prince Luís Filipe), Paiva Couceiro maintained his position until July 22, 1909, after realizing many public works. His eventual resignation was the result of mounting frustrations between his colonial government and the Regenerator government of Venceslau de Sousa Pereira de Lima.

He left Luanda in June 1909, notwithstanding the protests from the local European settlers, who wanted him to continue on in the position. Arriving in Lisbon at the beginning of July, during the period of D. Manuel II of Portugal's final months, he received the commission to command the Grupo de Artilharia a Cavalo de Queluz ("Queluz Mounted Artillery"). While Portuguese politics was embroiled in constant scandals, in particular the allegations of fraud in the Crédito Predial Português, Paiva Couceiro remained relatively separated from these conflicts, occupied with his aspirations of obtaining a promotion to Major.

== Counter-revolutionary ==
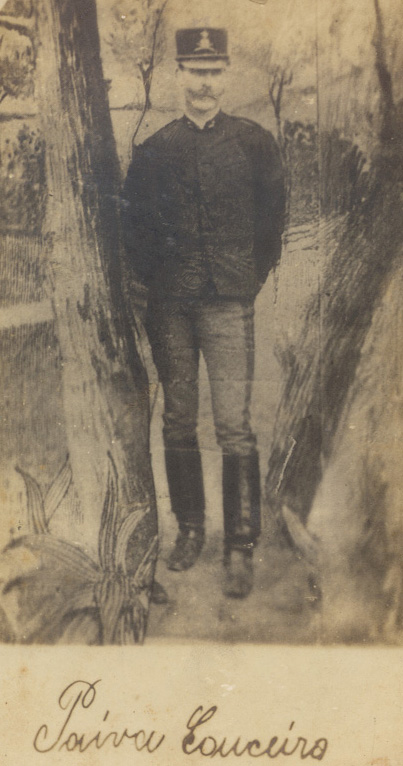
Paiva Couceiro in Galicia (June, 1912)

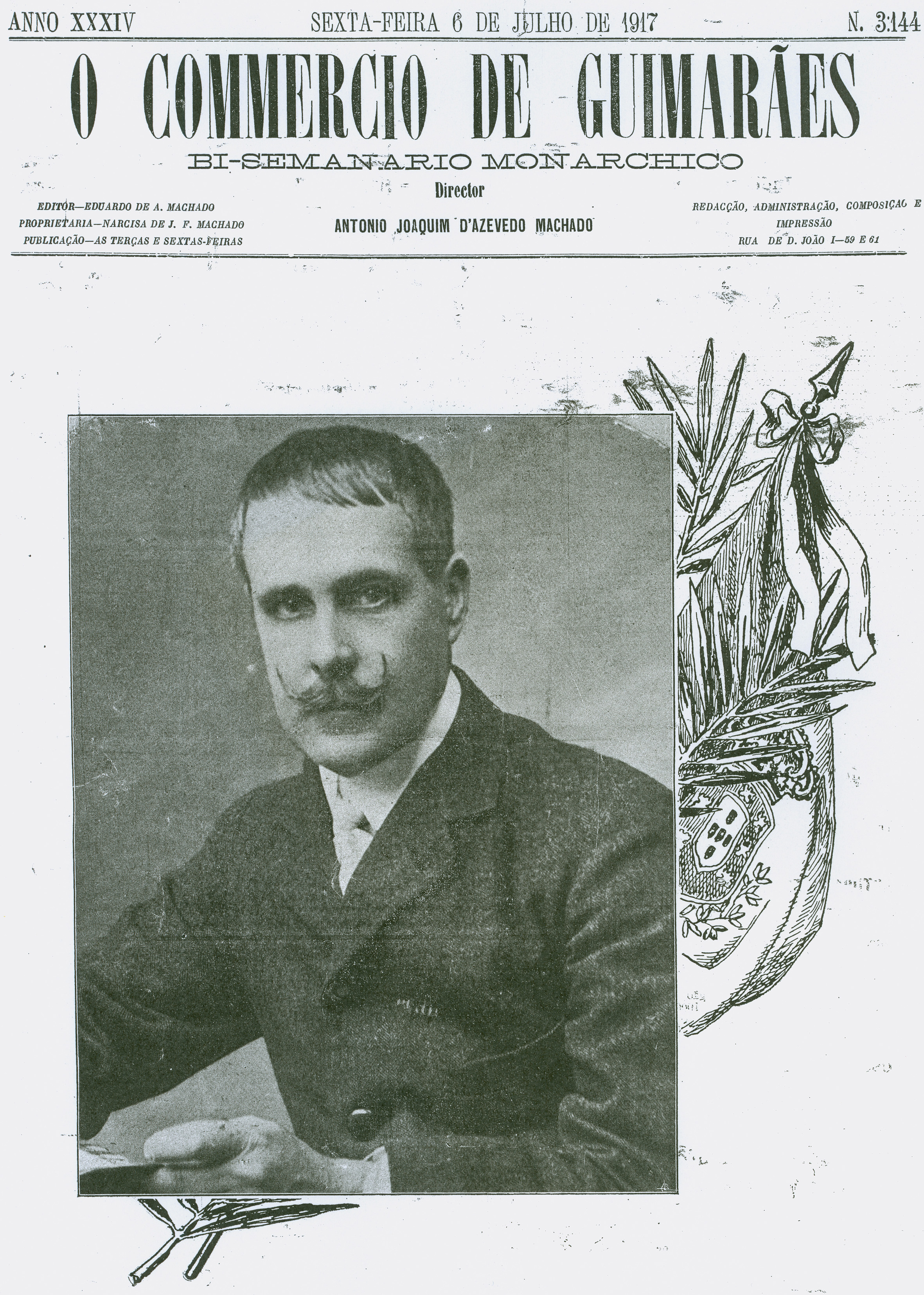
Magazine cover marking the 5th Anniversary of the Battle of Chaves

His silence was broken in July 1910, when he published an editorial in the Franco supported O Correio da Manhã and signed HPC, wherein he appealed for a counter-revolution to save the monarchy. He then was involved in several inconsequential conspiracies, in order to implant a monarchist regime in Parliament, defending most of the ideas anti-democratic Republicans adopted. His appeals were not given any debate. Rapidly, the regime fell on October 5, and the First Portuguese Republic was proclaimed.

Paiva Couceiro was one of the few military commanders to try and seriously stop the revolution, without success.

His artillery, located on the Torel, was the only garrison to fire on the camps in the Rotunda or the Edward VII Park. Abandoned by other monarchist troops, and after bombarding the Rotunda, he marched to Sintra to join the King. On finding-out that D. Manuel II had moved to Mafra he attempted to meet-up with the King, who had subsequently evacuated from Ericeira on the royal yacht Amélia IV. At a time where Republican success was not clear, he was ordered by superiors to the barracks. The Portuguese military at this time had not yet joined the Republican revolution, and it was tenuous enough that Admiral Cândido dos Reis, fearing a crushing of the movement, committed suicide. Henrique Paiva Couceiro was informed of this event and the fragility of the Republican revolution, although it is unclear whether at that moment he was willing to disobey his superiors and take the initiative to continue the battle against the Republicans. The Republican revolution was not as widely supported; photos taken in the Praça do Município, when the Republican directorate took control, showed few residents celebrating the revolution. Although considered a monarchist, on October 6, he was contacted by the Provisional Government to determine his allegiance, even after the events at the Rotunda. In an interview with Joaquim Leitão, Paiva Couceiro recounted his response:

I recognize the institutions that the people recognize. But, if the people's opinion isn't unanimous, if the North does not agree with the South, I will be, until the end, on the side of the faithful to tradition. And if it requires foreign intervention to support the Monarchy, then I will be on the side of the Republic...Afterwards I asked to resign. I asked it because, after many years of sacrifice and work under the blue and white colors and shields of our flag, I did not think, I could not take to abandon the symbol of the history of my Country. [To] Pretend that a symbol with roots in our soul and [which] inspired respect in all the World and [the] works of many generations. And I, for my part, find myself too old to begin now, a new struggle that the garlands of a new flag require.

After his proposal to the Provisional Government, on March 18, 1911, and following the May 28, 1911, elections (which he did not recognize), he went to the Ministry of War and resigned his commission, depositing his sword and stating: "I deliver my resignation and leave the Country to ferment conspiracy. Arrest me if you wish." No one responded, and he turn his back and left the Ministry, without anyone arresting him.

He commanded a monarchist incursion on October 4, 1911. This entered Portugal from Cova da Lua, Espinhosela and Vinhais (where the monarchist flag was raised from the balconies of the city council halls) and attacked the city of Chaves, with the discreet indifference of the Spanish government of Alfonso XIII. Three days later, Republican forces forced his troops into retreat, and they escaped to Galicia.

In December 1911, he participated in meetings to deal with the dynastic question imposed by D. Manuel II and his cousin, D. Miguel, that was settled in the "Dover Pact", which was published in London (December 30, 1911). Writing in his journal, Paiva Couceiro wrote: "And finally we can fix on the 30th of January (1912), the date of the meeting of the Royal Persons in Dover, in respect to the protocol. In fact, they realized on this date and place, a meeting between the King D. Manuel and his cousin D. Miguel of Braganza, in a hall of the Lord Warden Hotel, where there appeared also, the Viscount of Assêca who accompanied D. Manuel, the Viscount of São João da Pesqueira, who accompanied D. Miguel, and Paiva Couceiro in the role of Chief of the Combatants, accompanied by Francisco Pombal. The King D. Manuel and the lord D. Miguel of Braganza signed the monumental "Pact of Dover"."

Along with other "incursionistas", Paiva Couceiro was sentenced in absentia by the 2nd District Court in Oporto, on June 17, 1912; along with Couceiro were included Father Domingos Pires, José Maria Fernandes, Abílio Ferreira, Firmino Augusto Martins, Manuel Lopes, David Lopes, Captain Jorge Camacho, Count of Mangualde, Captain Remédios da Fonseca, Medical Captain José Augusto Vilas Boas and Lieutenant Figueira. The judgment sentenced him to six years in prison, or ten years in exile and was considered "relatively mild considering the service provided to the Fatherland". The remaining attackers were convicted to six years in prison, 10-years in exile and some to 20-years. On July 6, 1912, he began his exile by commanding another monarchist incursion into Chaves which was, once more, repelled on July 8 by supporters of the republic and he and his supporters returned to exile. His sentence was formalized on November 19, 1912, by a military tribunal, officially exiling the Captain in 1915; in article 2 of the Amnesty Decree issued February 22, 1915, signed by Bernardino Luíz Machado Guimarães and Manuel Joaquim Rodrigues Monteiro it is made clear that the leaders and instigators, who included Paiva Couceiro specifically, were expelled from the territory of the Portuguese Republic for a period of ten years. The decree was promulgated by Pimenta de Castro in 1915 to include Azevedo Coutinho, Jorge Camacho, Victor Sepulveda and João de Almeida.

In 1915 he was invited to become Governor of Angola by the Republican government led by Araújo de Sá, Oliveira Jericote and others, at his home in Oeiras. Paiva Couceiro refused to serve in the government, and instead moved to Spain, where he continued to agitate for the restoration of the monarchy.

After Sidónio Pais was shot dead in Lisbon (December 1918), Paiva Couceiro found another opportunity to launch his monarchist goal. With the help of expatriates, he was able to subvert the institutions in the northern territories from Moinho along the Vouga River, and in the name of D. Manuel II of Portugal, exiled in Great Britain, attempted to restore the 1826 Constitution. His objective was the return of a corporate, Catholic monarchy; it was to this end that he proclaimed in Porto the "Monarchy of the North" (January 19 to February 13, 1919).

Paiva Couceiro exercised the role of President of the Governing Junta of the Kingdom (1919), whose function was equivalent to the Prime Minister. During these 25 days in power, the governing Junta revoked all republican legislation promulgated since October 5, 1910, restored the monarchist flag and anthem and attempted to legislate its legitimacy. At the time Paiva Couceiro was supported by leaders in the "Integralistas", including Luís de Almeida Braga (its Secretary) and António Sardinha. In Monsanto, he was helped by Pequito Rebelo and Hipólito Raposo. Because of his role in these monarchist incursions, and for his loyalty to the cause, he became known as O Paladino (the Paladin).

Soldiers! You have in front of yourselves the Blue and White flag! Soldiers! Those were always the colors of Portugal, since Afonso Henriques, at Ourique, in the defense of our land against the Moors, until when D. Manuel II was king and maintained it against the African rebels in our dominions of Magul, Coolela, Cuamato and many other battles that illustrate our Portuguese army...When in 1910, Portugal abandoned the Blue and White, Portugal abandoned its history! And the people that abandoned their history are those people who fall and die.

Soldiers! The Army, above all, is the highest expression of the Fatherland and, for this, it must support and guard the nation in the most difficult circumstances, aiding in the appropriate hour against risks, be them external or internal, that threatens its existence...And to abandon your history is an error that kills! Against this error you must protest. Therefore, the Army, raises again the Blue and White flag...Show it the road to valor, to loyalty and bravado, where the Portuguese of the past conquered greatness and fame, which still today give dignity to the Army of Portugal in front of the nations of the World!

We swear to follow it, soldiers! And to protect it with our bodies, even at the cost of our own blood! And with the help of God, and the force of traditional convictions, that the Blue and White symbolize, our Fatherland will save us!

Long live the King D. Manuel II!

Long live the Army! Long live the Portuguese Fatherland!

The monarchist rebellion of 1919 soon ended, since it did not have enough active support in the country at large, and above all because of the failure of Manuel II himself to come to the monarchists' aid. On February 13, Paiva Couceiro was once again brought before a military tribunal, convened to sentence the participants of the Northern Monarchy; along with António Solari Alegro, he was condemned to exile on December 3, 1920, this time for 25 years (Diário do Minho, Braga 4/12/1920). But under a new amnesty, decreed on January 24, 1924, he returned to Portugal.

During the Estado Novo Paiva Couceiro was yet again banished, this time for six months, following a public criticism which he had made of the colonial politics employed by António de Oliveira Salazar's administration. This did not diminish Paiva Couceiro's outspokenness, and on October 31, 1937, he was arrested anew by Salazar's government; at the age of 77 he was sent to Granadilla de Abona, on the Spanish island of Santa Cruz de Tenerife, in the Canary Islands. Two years later, he was permitted to return to Portugal, and there to the last he declared his imperial aspirations:

"Empire we are, Empire we must remain"

== Marriage and later life ==
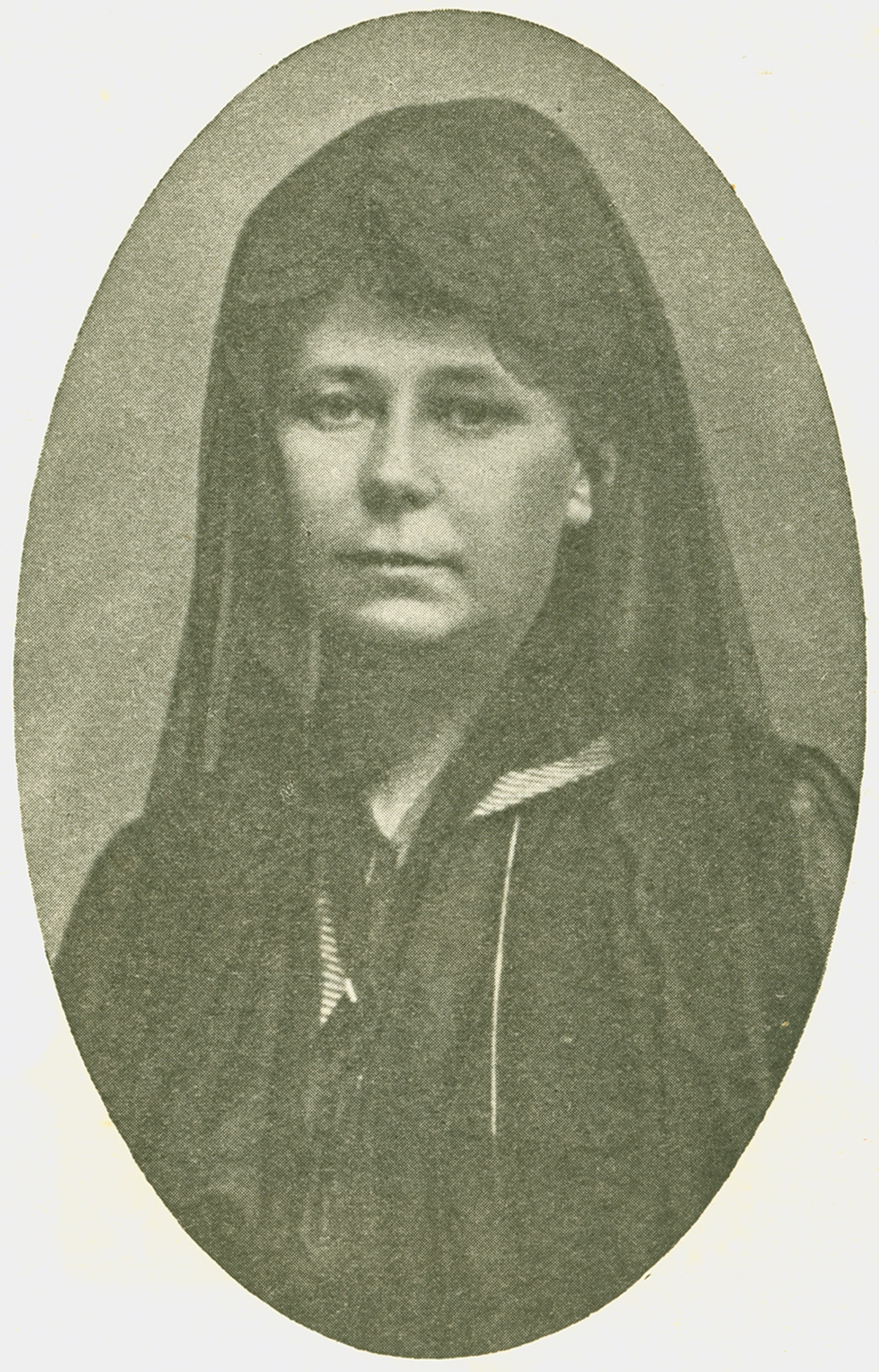
D. Júlia Maria do Carmo de Noronha

On November 21, 1896, he married Júlia Maria de Noronha, only daughter of the 3rd Count of Parati in the parish of Encarnação, with King D. Carlos acting as best-man. He had quickly been propelled into the higher echelons of the social class: a prestigious military hero, linked to the Royal House of Portugal, married to a noble House, and an intimate of D. Isabel de Sousa Botelho (her mother-in-law), who was a member of high society that circled the King. Their relationship could not be any more magnanimous: Paiva Couceiro fashioned himself the Nun'Álvares de Magul, while his wife remained at home and occupied herself with the faith.

D. Júlia was as pious and religious as her husband; she frequented the Congregação das Religiosas Reparadoras, a benevolent religious society, as well as becoming the lifelong president of the Associação Reparadora das Marias dos Sacráricos Calvários. The couple had three daughters, and two sons: Helena Francisca Maria do Carmo de Noronha de Paiva Couceiro (who became Mother Superior of the Colégio das Doroteias, in Benguela); Maria do Carmo de Noronha de Paiva Couceiro (founded the Filhas de Maria in India, but was not a nun, although she dedicated her life to religious and social works); the oldest daughter, Isabel Maria do Carmo de Noronha de Paiva Couceiro (who married António Carlos Sacramento Calainho de Azevedo, an ensign and first to raise the monarchical flag in 1919 counter-revolution; José António do Carmo de Noronha de Paiva Couceiro; and Miguel António do Carmo de Noronha de Paiva Couceiro, 4th Count of Parati. Of the couple's three daughters, two became nuns, one of them as a missionary in Angola.

Paiva Couceiro died in 1944. In that year, he issued one final political testament, which he made to his friend Preto Cruz:

"It was difficult being the Governor of Angola, but it was more difficult to be honest during the 34 years of the Republic."

After his death, his son eulogized his father:

"My father justified his combat against the Republic with the conviction that this regime did not correspond to the needs of the Country, nor that it expressed the mood of the nation."

== Published works ==
His published writings include many works on colonialism, resurgent nationalism, taken from the perspective of the Integralist Lusitania philosophies.

- Relatório de viagem entre Bailundo e as terras do Mucusso, Imprensa Nacional, 1892
- Angola: Estudo administrativo, Tipografia da Cooperativa Militar, 1898
- Artur de Paiva, A. Liberal, 1900
- A Democracia Nacional, Imprensa Portuguesa, Lisboa, depositários França & Arménio, Coimbra, 1917
- O Soldado Prático, Tipografia Silvas, Ltd, Lisboa, para as Edições Gama, Lisboa, 1936
- Angola: dois anos de governo, Junho 1907 – Junho 1909, Edições Gama, Lisboa, 1948 [foi acompanhada pela obra de Norton de Matos, Angola: ensaio sobre a vida e acção de Paiva Couceiro em Angola que se publica ao reeditar-se o seu relatório de Governo Edições Gama, Lisboa, 1948].
- Angola, história e comentários, Tipografia Portuguesa, 1948
- Angola: Projecto de Fomento, Edição da Revista "Portugal Colonial", Lisboa, 1931
- Subsídios para a Obra do Ressurgimento Nacional, Fascículo I – O Estado Nacional, Tipografia "Hesperia", Madrid, 1929
- Subsídios para a Obra do Ressurgimento Nacional, Fascículo II – A Nação Organizada, Tipografia da Gazeta dos Caminhos de Ferro, Lisboa, 1929
- Profissão de Fé (Lusitânia Transformada), seu último livro e verdadeiro testamento político, com prefácio de Luís de Almeida Braga, Tipografia Leitão, Porto, para as Edições Gama, Lisboa, 1944
- Experiência de Tracção Mecânica na Província de Angola, Imprensa da Livraria Ferin, Lisboa, 1902
- Carta Aberta aos Meus Amigos e Companheiros, edição da Acção Realista Portuguesa, Biblioteca de Estudos Nacionalistas, 1924
- Projecto de Orçamento do ano Económico de 1917/18 do Distrito de Angola, Lisboa : Revista "Portugal Colonial", 1931.
