= Francisco Rolão Preto =

Portuguese politician (1893–1977)

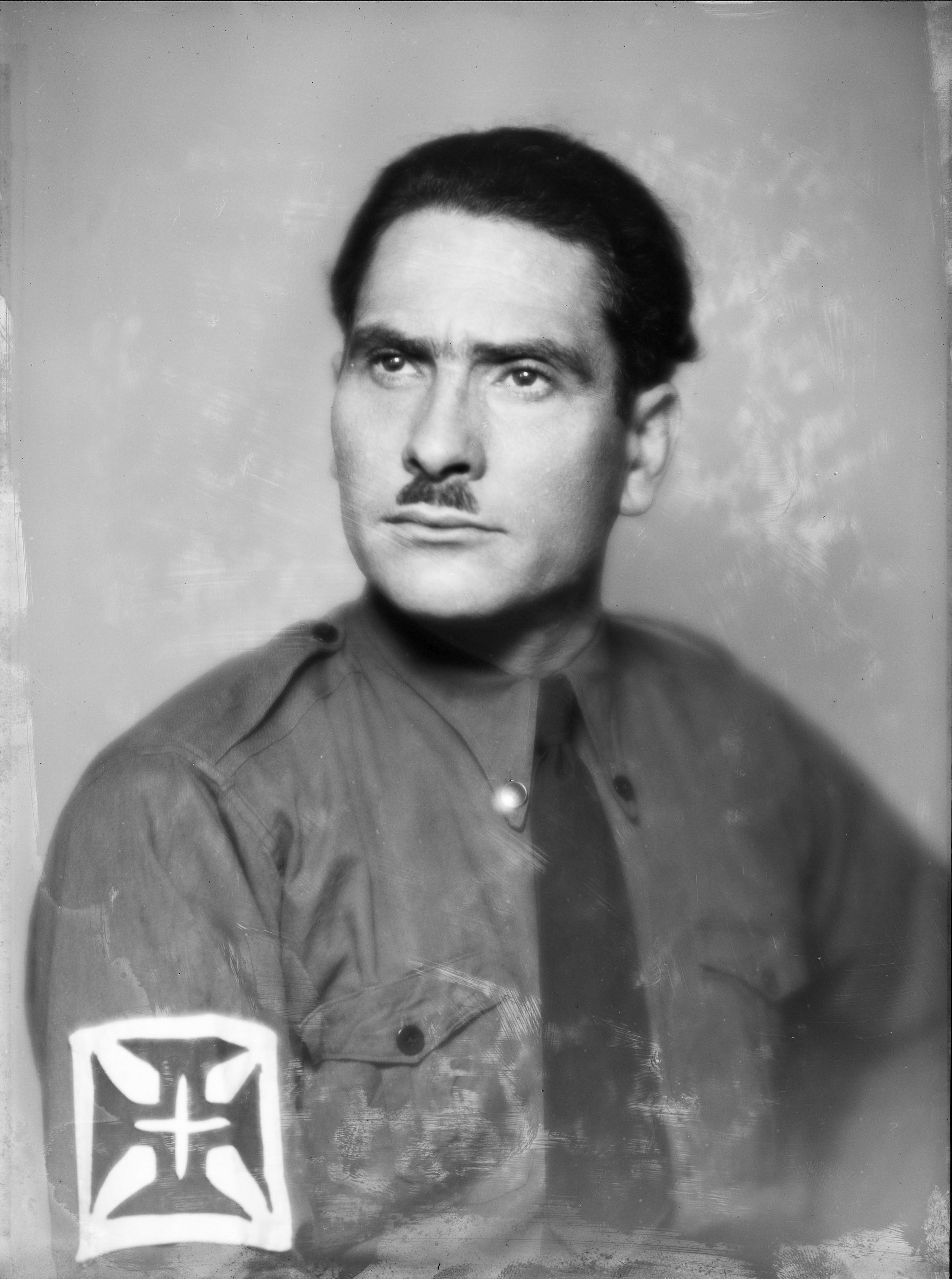
- Rolão Preto in the uniform of the National Syndicalist Blueshirts

Leader of the National Syndicalist Movement
- In office 15 February 1932 – 29 July 1934
- Preceded by: Office established
- Succeeded by: Office abolished

Personal details
- Born: 12 February 1893 Gavião, Portugal
- Died: 18 December 1977 (aged 84) Lisbon, Portugal
- Party: National Syndicalists (1932–1934); People's Monarchist Party (1974–1977)
- Spouse: Amália Boavida Godinho
- Children: 2
- Education: University of Toulouse

Francisco de Barcelos Rolão Preto, GCIH (12 February 1893, Gavião – 18 December 1977, Hospital do Desterro, Lisbon) was a Portuguese politician, journalist, and leader of the Portuguese National Syndicalist Movement (MNS), a fascist organization. In 1934, when Portuguese dictator, António de Oliveira Salazar, banned the National Syndicalist Movement, Preto was detained and later exiled from Portugal. While exiled and in Madrid, he was a guest in the house of José Antonio Primo de Rivera, with whom he collaborated in formulating a program for the Falange. In the eve of the Second World War he published a new editions of his work on Italian Fascism with high hopes on the Berlin-Rome axis.

After World War II, Rolão Preto abandoned fascism and joined the left-wing forum Movement of Democratic Unity. In 1949 he participated in General Norton de Matos’s 1949 presidential election campaign. He also backed more liberal candidates for the Presidency, such as Quintão Meireles, Francisco Higino Craveiro Lopes, and, ultimately, had a particularly important role in the 1958 campaign of another Salazar's opponent, General Humberto Delgado.

After the Revolution of April 25, with Gonçalo Ribeiro Telles, Henrique Barrilaro Ruas, João Camossa de Saldanha, Augusto Ferreira do Amaral, Luís Coimbra, among others, he founded the People's Monarchist Party. In 1994, the Portuguese President Mário Soares granted him, posthumously, the Great Cross of the Order of Prince Henry the Navigator.

== Early life ==
Cutting short his lyceum studies, Rolão Preto left for Galicia in Spain, where he joined the monarchist army officer, Henrique Mitchell de Paiva Couceiro, in his 1911–1912 failed attempts to topple the Portuguese First Republic. He then left for Belgium and worked for the integralist magazine, Alma Portuguesa, while completing secondary studies at the Liceu português in Louvain and then attending the Université Catholique there.

Rolão Preto had to flee Belgium when World War I began, and he took refuge in France; he finished his studies at the University of Toulouse, where he earned a degree in law before returning to Portugal. He replaced the jailed Hipólito Raposo as editor of the journal, A Monarquia. A member of the Junta Central de Integralismo Lusitano from 1922 onward, he began a close collaboration with the President of Portugal, Gomes da Costa, even before the 28 May 1926 coup d'état which established the Ditadura Nacional, and edited the 12 points the coup leaders published in Braga.

== National Syndicalists ==
The National Syndicalists, also called the "Blue Shirts" (camisas azuis), following the tradition of uniformed right-wing paramilitary groups, was an organisation advocating syndicalism and unionism, inspired by Benito Mussolini's brand of Italian fascism. As Rolão Preto wrote in July 1922, "our organic syndicalism is essentially the basis of current syndicalist thought among Mussolini's friends". MNS was also built on previous allegiances to Integralismo Lusitano, but it was not inspired by the Action Française as alleged by their adversaries.

He advocated especially the personalism of Emmanuel Mounier and some of the aspects of unionism. His unionist platform was based on leftist ideas of social justice, such as "a minimum family wage", "paid holidays", "working class education", and a world in which workers are "guaranteed the right to happiness".

== Anti-Salazar activist ==
In 1930, he approached David Neto and other sidonista (conservatives, initially members of the Partido Republicano Nacionalista), with whom he created the Liga Nacional 28 de maio, self-proclaimed defender of the "national revolution". Rolão Preto gained notoriety as an advocate of national syndicalism and as editor of the Diário Académico Nacionalista da Tarde, first published in 1932, which soon changed its name to the Diário Nacional-Sindicalista da Tarde. He founded the Blue Shirts, which used the Order of Christ Cross, displayed the Roman salute, and became very popular in universities and among the youngest officers of the Portuguese Army.

The Preto personality cult grew in 1933 as the movement took to the streets and Preto engaged himself in a national propaganda tour. Preto became a regular presence at Italian Embassy receptions. The movement's newspapers began to call Preto the Chief (Chefe), and internal party correspondence reveals that he was revered by his followers. Delegates from the Italian National Fascist Party and German Nazi Party regularly attended the rallies of Preto's movement. In the summer of 1933, the Civil Governors were instructed to prohibit public National Syndicalist demonstrations but Preto's followers managed to organize demonstrations, hiring a tugboat to greet the Italian Fascist leader Italo Balbo when he visited Lisbon. Preto also started to organize militias (Shock Brigades). According to Police reports the Lisbon Brigade, known as the Black Brigade (Brigada Negra), composed of about 60 men, became quite active on the streets.

After a long meeting with the chief of the political police, Salazar decided to dissolve the National Syndicalist Movement. On 4 July 1934 Preto was briefly detained and later exiled as part of purge of the leadership of the National Syndicalist Movement. Salazar denounced the National Syndicalists as "inspired by certain foreign models" and their "exaltation of youth, and the cult of force through direct action, the principle of the superiority of state political power in social life, [and] the propensity for organizing masses behind a single leader" as fundamental differences between fascism and the Catholic corporatism of the New State. The British Embassy informed London with some satisfaction stating that the Portuguese National Syndicalist Movement took "its inspiration from the Italian Embassy" and described Preto as a "vain man with a strong sense of intrigue".

Preto ended up opposing the Salazar's regime for being too moderate and due to Salazar's refusal to turn the emerging corporative state into a truly fascist regime. Preto resided, for a while, in Valencia de Alcántara, near the border with Castelo de Vide, and then in Madrid, as a guest in the house of José Antonio Primo de Rivera, with whom he collaborated in formulating a program for the Falange.

Preto returned to Portugal in February 1935, and was once more detained after instigating a September rebellion with the crew of the Bartolomeu Dias and the garrison in the Lisbon-area Penha de França. Again exiled, he fought in the Spanish Civil War on Francisco Franco's side.

Preto returned, once more, to Portugal in the eve of the Second World War and published new editions of his work on Italian Fascism originally written in 1922. Preto placed high hopes on the Berlin-Rome axis, and in his introduction to Fascism (O Fascismo), he attacked the Salazar regime and exalted Italian and German Fascism. With the rise of Nazism in Germany and Fascism in Italy, Rolao Preto was optimistic about the future of European fascism, he pinned all of his hopes on an Axis victory, and confronted those who were not "real fascists" but wished to adopt aspects of fascism.

After World War II, Rolão Preto abandoned fascism and joined the left-wing forum Movement of Democratic Unity, and he published a volume entitled A Traição Burguesa ("The Bourgeois Betrayal"). The book criticised fascist regimes for becoming victims of social and political compromises with the bourgeoisie. In 1945 he thought that "neither the glorious clarions of nationalist mysticism nor the powerful social projections of Nazi efforts can make us forget what Nazism represented - the deception of the revolutionary hopes that gave birth to National Socialism".

In 1949 participated in General Norton de Matos’s 1949 presidential election campaign. He also backed more liberal candidates for the Presidency, such as Quintão Meireles, Francisco Higino Craveiro Lopes, and, ultimately, had a particularly important role (campaign press manager) in the 1958 campaign of another New State dissident, General Humberto Delgado.

== Monarchism and later years ==
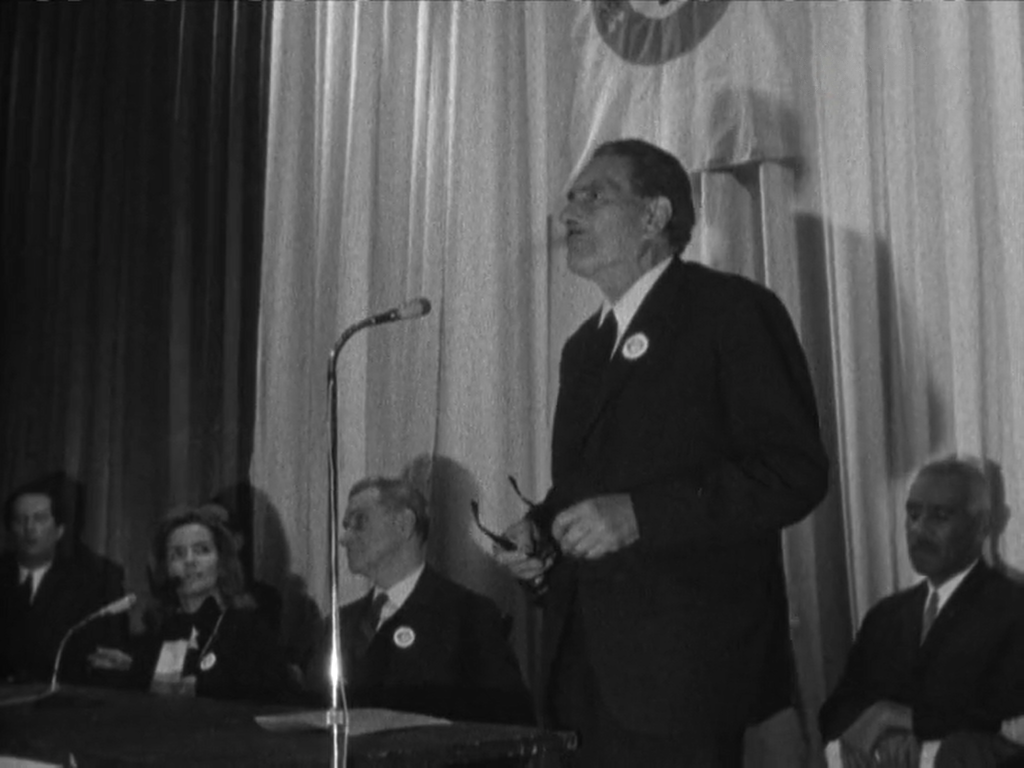
Near the end of his political career Preto (standing) became an ardent monarchist, founding the People's Monarchist Party in 1974.

After the fall of the Estado Novo regime Preto attempted to unite the monarchist movement behind Gonçalo Ribeiro Telles's Movimento Popular Monárquico. Preto was one of the leaders of the Movimento (People's Monarchist Party) in the period between the Carnation Revolution (1974) and his death (1977).

In 1994, the Portuguese President Mário Soares granted him, posthumously, the Great Cross of the Order of Prince Henry the Navigator.

== Marriage and children ==
He married Amália de Brito Boavida Godinho (b. Fundão, Alpedrinha), and had two children:

- Francisco Godinho Rolão Preto (b. Fundão, Soalheira), married to Maria Isabel Correia da Silva Mendes; and
- Maria Teresa Godinho Rolão Preto (b. Fundão, Soalheira), married to Eduardo Teixeira Gomes.

== Sources ==
- Costa Pinto, António (2000). The Blue Shirts - Portuguese Fascists and the New State. Social Science Monographs, Boulder - Distributed by Columbia University Press, NY. ISBN 088033-9829.
- S. U. Larsen, B. Hagtvet & J. P. Myklebust, Who Were the Fascists: Social Roots of European Fascism, Oslo, 1980
- Payne, Stanley G. (1995). A History of Fascism, 1914-1945. University of Wisconsin Pres, 1996. pp. 312-315. ISBN 9780299148737.
