= José Adriano Pequito Rebelo =

Portuguese writer, politician and aviator (1892–1983)

José Adriano Pequito Rebelo (21 May 1892 in Gavião, Portugal – 22 January 1983 in Lisbon) was a Portuguese writer, politician and aviator.

== Early life ==
Born into a monarchist family, Pequito Rebelo studied law at University of Coimbra where he followed in the family's political footsteps. He followed his family into exile in the early 1910s to Paris and whilst there became converted to the Action Française school of monarchism.

== Integralismo ==
On his return to Portugal in 1914 he became a founder of Integralismo Lusitano along with José Hipólito Raposo, Alberto Monsaraz and António Sardinha. Uniquely amongst this leadership Pequito Rebelo enlisted in the Portuguese Expeditionary Corps during the First World War, whilst also writing extensively for the integralist journals, often on the theme of his hatred for urbanism.

Pequito Rebelo was involved in the monarchist uprising of 1919 and suffered serious wounds in the fighting. However, when brought to trial for his involvement he was surprisingly exonerated.

== New ideals ==
Pequito Rebelo's ideas appeared to radicalise with age as he came under the influence of Georges Valois and took to writing for the syndicalist paper Politico. He looked set for a switch to the National Syndicalists but again changed his mind and became a loyalist for António de Oliveira Salazar. The two enjoyed a fairly cordial personal relationship and in 1932 Pequito Rebelo advised Salazar to abandon the Portuguese constitution and establish a new order in the country. They remained in regular correspondence throughout the 1930s.

== Adventurism ==
Left somewhat restless by his support for the government Pequito Rebelo volunteered as an aviator in the Spanish Civil War on the side of Francisco Franco. In later years he became a leading advocate of colonialism and in 1961, despite his age, volunteered for pilot duties against pro-independence guerrillas in Portuguese Angola.

He continued writing until his death in 1983.
