= Integralismo Lusitano =

Lusitanian Integralism Integralismo Lusitano
- Abbreviation: IL
- Founders: José Hipólito Vaz Raposo; Luís de Almeida Braga; António de Sousa Sardinha; Alberto de Monsaraz; Francisco Rolão Preto
- Founded: 1914; 112 years ago
- Dissolved: 1932; 94 years ago (as a political organization)
- Succeeded by: National Syndicalist Movement
- Ideology: Monarchism; Integralism; Antiliberalism; Corporatism; National syndicalism; Traditionalist conservatism; Anti-parliamentarism; Anti-Masonry
- Political position: Far-right
- Religion: Roman Catholicism

Integralismo Lusitano (English: "Lusitanian Integralism") was a Portuguese integralist political movement founded in Coimbra in 1914 that advocated traditionalism as opposed to more moderate forms of conservatism. It was against parliamentarism and favoured decentralization, national syndicalism, an expanded role of the Catholic Church in society and restoration the Portuguese monarchy.

== Origin ==
Lusitanian Integralism is a variant of integralism that evolved in Portugal, the term "Lusitania" being the Latin term for the southern region of what is now Portugal. The movement was founded to address the threats of anticlerical liberalism, socialism, populist and revolution. The movement drew inspiration from the French royalist movement Action française and considered its model of an authoritarian, nationalist and corporatist monarchy to be ideal. The movement was particularly active during the Portuguese First Republic, which it criticised.

== Activities ==
It initially supported the last King of Portugal, Manuel II but refused to back him after 1920 after the attempts to restore the monarchy that were initiated in Monsanto Forest Park, Lisbon, and during the Monarchy of the North, but it supported Manuel's cousin, Miguel of Braganza.

Integralismo Lusitano's notable members included António Sardinha, Alberto de Monsaraz, José Adriano Pequito Rebelo, José Hipólito Vaz Raposo, João Ameal, Leão Ramos Ascensão, Luís de Almeida Braga, and Francisco Rolão Preto.

The leadership remained active in 1917–1918, when it supported the leadership of Sidónio Pais, but it also backed the Ditadura Nacional (National Dictatorship), established after the 28 May 1926 coup d'état. It adopted part of the Integralismo Lusitano's ideology.

When Manuel II died without heirs in 1932, the movement rallied all monarchists behind the descendants of Miguel, who had been exiled after the Liberal Wars.

Integralismo Lusitano published a journal called Nação Portuguesa, which collaborated with other figures for its counter-revolutionary publications. It was founded by Raposo.

== See also ==
- Monarchy of the North
- Brazilian Integralism
- Patrianovism

== Further readings ==
- Ramos Ascensão, Leão, O Integralismo Lusitano, Edições Gama, 1943. (https://web.archive.org/web/20140531114649/http://www.causanacional.net/INTEGRALISMO.pdf)
- Machado, Diamantino P. (1991), The Structure of Portuguese Society: The Failure of Fascism, Westport, Connecticut: Praeger Publishers
