= National Syndicalists (Portugal) =

National Syndicalist Movement Movimento Nacional Sindicalista
- Founder: Francisco Rolão Preto
- Founded: 1932; 94 years ago
- Banned: 29 July 1934; 92 years ago
- Preceded by: Integralismo Lusitano
- Headquarters: Lisbon, Portugal
- Newspaper: Revolução
- Youth wing: Blue Shirts
- Paramilitary: Blueshirts
- Ideology: National syndicalism Integralismo Lusitano; Corporatism; Social Catholicism; Anti-communism; Anti-capitalism; Clerical fascism
- Political position: Far-right
- Religion: Catholic Church
- Colours: Blue
- Slogan: "Pronto!" "Pelo Homem, contra a máquina!"

Party flag
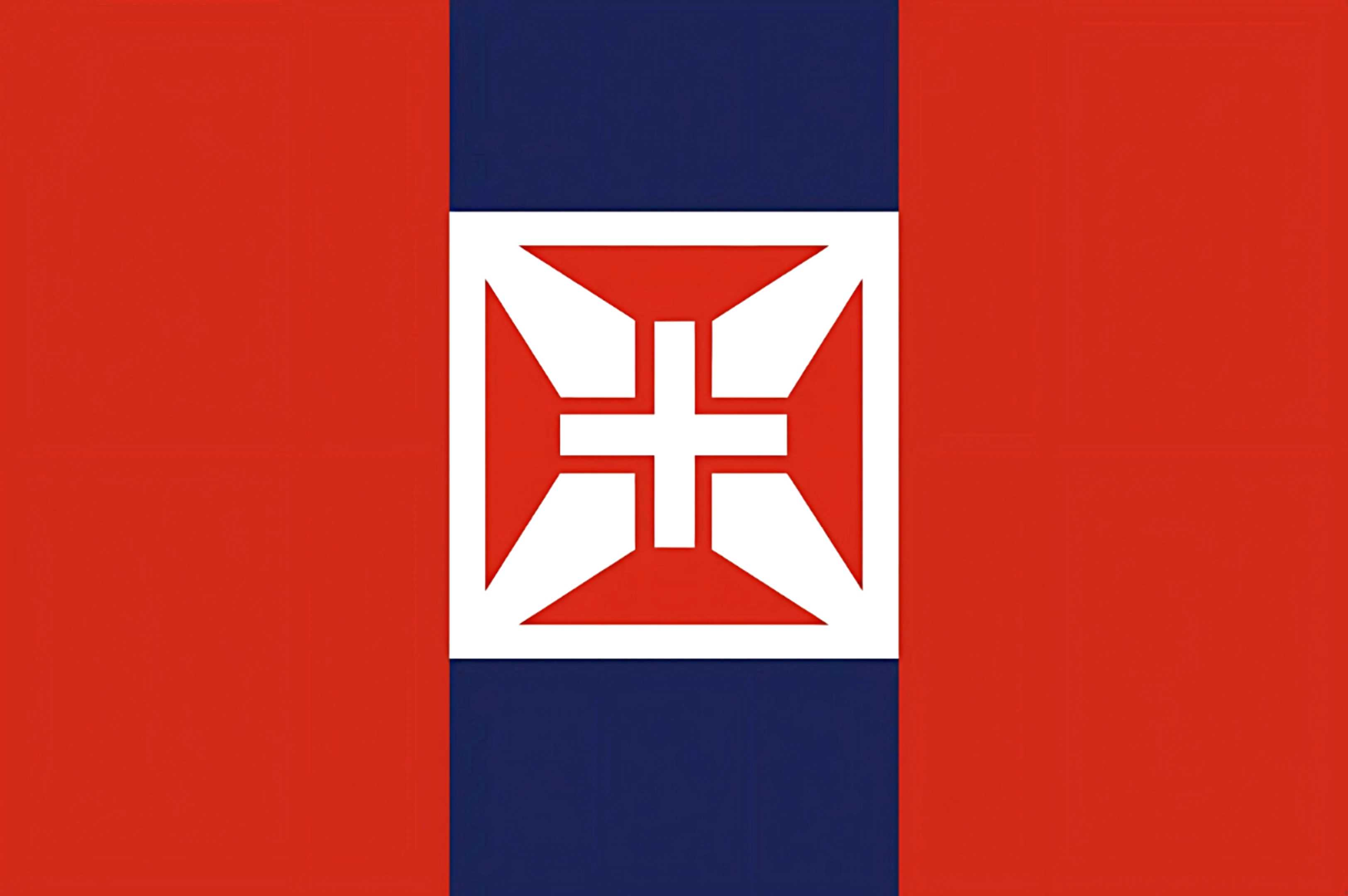

The National Syndicalist Movement (Portuguese: Movimento Nacional-Sindicalista) was a fascist political movement that briefly flourished in Portugal in the 1930s.

== Political activity and mobilisation ==
The Movimento Nacional-Sindicalista aimed to create a mass political movement unlike in the previous movement Francisco Rolão Preto was in, The integralismo Lussitano which was mostly an intellectual party.Francisco Rolão Preto led the movement by using their own newspaper (Revoluçao (1932-1934)) along with public meetings such as the Alenquer rally, banquets were mostly used for special events of the movement with for example the anniversary of their newspaper,promo tours such as the one in Northern Portugal to recruit Portuguese individuals to their movement. The movement's newspaper, Revolução was an important part of the movement as it spread propaganda.

=== Expansion and recruitment ===
The Movimento Nacional Sindicalista spread their activity outside of Lisbon, setting up local groups in other regions of Portugal. Promo tours such as the one in Northern Portugal shows us that their influence was indeed spread out and even attracted several different social classes, while it mostly attracted both Proletariat and Petite Bourgeoisie.

The movement also put in place huge banquets although those were for special occasions such as the anniversary of the newspaper and to honor Francisco Rolão Preto

=== Propaganda and public demonstrations ===
The MNS relied on propaganda and demonstrations. Its newspaper Revolução was used to advertise the program of the movement, their own opinion on political issues and to recruit or have the interests individuals

The MNS demonstrations often rivaled the interests of the government on several issues such as the one in Africa.

=== Uniforms and political mobilisation ===
The MNS used a very similar uniform to the one's of fascist movements in Europe enhance why they used a roman salute and wore blue shirts showing the influence of fascism on the movement on even its attire.

=== Mobilisation in 1934 ===
The MNS continued to demonstrate its movement in 1934 despite gradual pressure from the Estado Novo. On 28 May, National Syndicalists assembled in Porto and Braga for demonstrations marking the anniversary of the 1926 military coup.

The government's increasing restrictions on the movement's activities, including the permanent closing of National-Syndicalist establishments in Lisbon and Porto evolved into the ban of the MNS in July 1934.

== Ideology ==
The Movimento Nacional Sindicalista or MNS, believed in national syndicalism more specifically in a Portuguese adaptation that integrated the teachings of Lusitanian Integralism along with separate views away from Lusitanian Integralism developed by Francisco Rolão Preto such as the beliefs of a fourth way away from liberal capitalism, communism, fascism, while political scientists and others professional still see them as fascists, Rolão Preto never accepted this.

The Movimento Nacional-Sindicalista advocated a form of national syndicalism. The program of the MNS called for a Corporatist and Syndicalist organization of the economy. It developed the thought that private property should be accepted as it is as "Natural right" but it should still be limited according to its social utility. Political representation was conceived through municipalitism and Corporatism Rolão Preto believed that the "Resurrection Of the Dead" (A specific chapter in Justiça! And metaphor that speaks of the old social, political, economic forces) " This macabre and grotesque resurrection of the dead comes from the four corners of the past..." In this specific passage he speaks about feudalism, old elites, Parliamentary politicians, political bosses and Reactionaries. By this we can say that the Movimento Nacional Sindicalista was Strongly opposed to Reactionarism while still firmly supporting tradition.

=== Authority and freedom ===
The Movimento Nacional-Sindicalista supported an anti parlementary state but its principal theorist, Francisco Rolão Preto, Differentiated political authority from unlimited state power. In Justiça! (1936), he argued that the Revolution would necessarily be anti-parliamentary and Authoritarian while questioning the legitimacy of totalitarianism. He also questioned whether a state «that no one oversees, yet has the right to oversee us all» could represent a genuinely revolutionary conception.

Rolão Preto as a result wanted to reconcile authority with freedom. He argued that a strong authoritarian state was needed partly because of the results of liberal-democratic state but still argued that this did not justify totalitarianism. His view of political authority was as a result authoritarian.

=== Fourth Way ===
Rolão Preto presented National Syndicalism as a Fourth Way (Quarta-Via),which was an alternative view to liberalism, communism and fascism.

The Fourth Way was developed further in Rolão Preto's 1936 book Justiça!. Its political philosophy believed in the importance of freedom and of the dignity of the person while still being against individualism. José Manuel Quintas has interpreted this conception as a personalist and communitarian Way.

=== The State and political organisation ===
The National-Syndicalist conception of the state was based on the idea that political authority should serve Man, the people, the national community rather than to be an end in itself. In Justiça!, Rolão Preto described the state as an organ of society and rejected totalitarianism.

The MNS's programme proposed an organic representation (Corporatist). Its National Assembly influenced by Municipalitism and Corporatism wanted to include the representation of Municipalities through representatives. The programme also wanted to organize the life of workers through syndicates and the coordination of economic activity through a corporative system.

This political organisation was connected to Rolão Preto's personalist views. In Justiça!, he argued that social groups such as the family, syndicate and the nation itself should serve the human person.

=== Economics, property and syndicalism ===
The economic programme of the Movimento Nacional-Sindicalisa wanted to establish an alternative to both liberal capitalism and communism. In Justiça!, Rolão Preto criticised capitalism for allowing life to become dominated by the pursuit of profit, while also rejecting communist collectivism.

Rolão Preto proposed measures aimed to provide workers with housing, a minimum wage, family allowances and protection in cases of illness and old age. He also advocated the nationalisation of credit, cooperatives and communal ownership in some cases.

Syndicates occupied an important position in this system. Rolão Preto described the syndicate as the «unidade base duma política económica-social» ("basic unit of an economic-social policy") and argued that syndical organisation should protect the interests and dignity of workers while maintaining a social balance between labour and property.

The programme also called for the «desproletarização das massas» ("deproletarianisation of the masses"). This involved measures intended to give worker greater economic security and independence. Rolão Preto consequently wanted to transform the social position of workers.

== Development ==
The MNS emerged amongst a group of students who were associated with the Liga Nacional 28 de maio but had grown disillusioned with its right-wing economic platform. Under the leadership of Francisco Rolão Preto, the National Syndicalists emerged in 1932 from a tradition of Monarchism and Integralismo Lusitano ("Lusitanic Integralism") to offer a platform that they hoped would lead to full corporatism of association or unionism in opposition to capitalism and communism. They called for an Authoritarian state to rule Portugal, although they placed central importance on the Catholic Church and made Catholic identity an important part of their appeal. They adopted the Order of Christ Cross as their emblem, in order to underline their Christian ethos, and set up their own armed militia that became known as the "Blueshirts" (Camisas azuis) because of the colour of their uniforms (inspired by Benito Mussolini's Blackshirts); they also greeted each other using the Roman salute. Their main inspiration was Italian fascism although they were also linked to the Spanish Falange, who shared many of their ideas.

The MNS was a political movement also known as the "Blue Shirts," which they wore as a uniform. They held rallies in uniform, during which they used the Roman salute in vogue among European nationalist organizations of the time.

Rolão Preto clashed with José Antonio Primo de Rivera the founder and leader of the Spanish Falange Española, whom he dubbed "too capitalist", and the MNS also hinted at wishing to add Spanish Galicia to Portugal, a further source of tension with the Falangist. Brigadas de choque, a form of stormtrooper organisation, were established by the MNS although rarely utilised, with street battles not really a feature of Portuguese politics at the time. They grew rapidly in their early stages and were estimated to have 25,000 members by 1933, 5,000 more than the governing National Union. The National Syndicalists were fairly critical of the regime of António de Oliveira Salazar and the Estado Novo.

Salazar allowed the group to hold a national conference in November 1933 and indicating if they abandoned open syndicalism he would be prepared to bring them into his National Union en bloc. Whilst this proposal was not accepted by the MNS as a group many members approved, resulting in a split within the movement in early 1934, with many of those in favour of the moderate approach rewarded with positions within Salazar's government. Salazar announced the dissolution of the group on July 29, 1934, condemning the group for its defense of syndicalism.

Salazar used to call the MNS "National Communists".

Despite this official end the National Syndicalists carried on in secret and Rolão Preto helped to lead a conspiracy against the government, which also involved moderate monarchists, some members of the Portuguese Republican Party, and even a few socialists and anarchists who simply wanted to overthrow the regime. The revolt took place on September 10, 1935 but it failed to gain the support of all but a small group of soldiers on board the Bartolomeu Dias warship and in the Lisbon area of Penha de França, being crushed almost immediately. As a result of this Rolão Preto and his deputy Alberto Monsaraz were forced into exile in Spain and the National Syndicalists were fully repressed. The dissidents of the National Syndicalists were subsequently integrated in the União Nacional.

== Relations with other movements ==
The Movimento Nacional-Sindicalista developed within the wider political environment of the European interwar period and maintained relationships with several movements of the Portuguese and European radical right. Its development was connected to earlier Integralismo Lusitano, while its political organisation and ideology developed alongside contemporary movements such as Italian Fascism and the Spanish Falange Española. The MNS also came into conflict with the Estado Novo after the consolidation of António de Oliveira Salazar's regime.

=== Integralismo Lusitano ===
The Movimento Nacional-Sindicalista emerged partly from the political and intellectual milieu of Integralismo Lusitano, a Portuguese monarchist and corporatist movement. Several National Syndicalists, including Francisco Rolão Preto, had previously been associated with Integralism. Historians have therefore examined National Syndicalism as both a continuation of and a development beyond the earlier Integralismo Lusitano tradition.

Despite these connections, National Syndicalism was not identical to Integralismo Lusitano. Integralism placed particular emphasis on monarchism and an organic political order based on the monarchy, whereas the MNS developed a more explicitly syndicalist and revolutionary programme.

=== Italian Fascism ===
The MNS developed during the expansion of Italian Fascism and shared several characteristics with contemporary fascist movements, including opposition to liberalism, communism and parliamentary politics, as well as an interest in corporatism, political mobilisation and organised national syndicalism. Historians have consequently situated Portuguese National Syndicalism within the broader development of European fascism.

At the same time, National Syndicalism developed within a specifically Portuguese political and intellectual context. Its programme combined elements associated with Portuguese Integralism, national syndicalism, corporatism and Catholic social teaching. Its relationship with Italian Fascism can therefore be understood as part of a broader European exchange of political ideas rather than as a complete identification of the two movements.

=== Spanish Falange ===
The MNS also maintained contacts with the Falange Española and other Spanish radical-right movements. Francisco Rolão Preto had political contacts with José Antonio Primo de Rivera, while National Syndicalist and Falangist circles interacted during the 1930s.

The two movements shared opposition to liberal parliamentarianism and communism and both advocated forms of syndical or corporative organisation. Nevertheless, National Syndicalism developed its own political programme within the Portuguese context and should not be treated as simply an extension of the Spanish Falange.

=== Salazarism and the Estado Novo ===
The relationship between the MNS and Salazarism was complex. Both opposed liberal parliamentarianism and shared elements of corporatist and authoritarian political thought, but they represented competing political projects for Portugal.

As António de Oliveira Salazar consolidated the Estado Novo, the National Syndicalists became increasingly critical of his regime. The MNS sought a more radical and mobilising form of national syndicalism, while Salazar sought to consolidate his own authoritarian political order. The movement was ultimately outlawed in 1934.

The conflict demonstrated that ideological similarities between the MNS and the Estado Novo did not eliminate their political rivalry. The consolidation of the Estado Novo resulted in the marginalisation and repression of the National Syndicalist movement and other competing currents of the Portuguese radical right.

== Conflict with the Estado Novo ==
The Movimento Nacional-Sindicalista initially operated within the political environment created by the 28 May 1926 coup d'état, but relations between the movement and the emerging Estado Novo increasingly deteriorated. Although the MNS and the government shared opposition to liberal democracy and communism, they differed over the political organisation of the new regime and the degree of autonomy that the National Syndicalists should retain.

=== Opposition to Salazar ===
Francisco Rolão Preto increasingly criticised António de Oliveira Salazar and the political direction of the Estado Novo during 1933. In a speech at the São Carlos in June of that year, Rolão Preto publicly challenged the government's political system and its development of a single-party structure.

The dispute was not simply a disagreement between two nationalist organisations. The MNS sought to maintain an autonomous political movement capable of mobilising its own supporters, while Salazar's regime increasingly sought to concentrate political activity within the União Nacional and the institutions of the Estado Novo. This produced increasing tension between the two sides.

=== Government restrictions ===
The authorities progressively restricted National-Syndicalist political activity. The movement's newspaper, Revolução, was suspended in 1933 following Rolão Preto's increasingly critical political activity, while public demonstrations and meetings were also subject to government restrictions.

The government also sought to weaken the movement by encouraging members to abandon its autonomous organisation and join the União Nacional. This contributed to an internal division within the MNS, with a significant faction favouring cooperation with Salazar while Rolão Preto and his supporters maintained the movement's political independence.

=== The 1934 confrontation ===
The conflict reached its decisive stage in 1934. On 20 June, Rolão Preto submitted a representation to President Óscar Carmona defending political and civic freedoms and arguing against the establishment of a political system based on a single party.

In the document, Rolão Preto explicitly questioned the introduction of a political party model which he associated with the fascist and totalitarian state. He argued that if the Estado Novo itself rejected a totalitarian conception of the State, there was no justification for imposing a political party which he regarded as an essential attribute of such systems.

Rolão Preto was subsequently arrested and sent into exile in Spain. On 29 July 1934, the government officially prohibited the National-Syndicalist organisation. The government's decision brought the MNS's existence as an autonomous political movement to an end.

=== Aftermath ===
Following the prohibition of the MNS, members of the movement followed different political paths. Some accepted the government's invitation to join the União Nacional, while Rolão Preto and other National-Syndicalists continued to oppose the Estado Novo.

The conflict between the MNS and the Estado Novo therefore reflected a broader disagreement within the Portuguese authoritarian right over the political organisation of the post-1926 regime. Although both opposed parliamentary liberalism, the National-Syndicalists sought to preserve an autonomous mass movement, while Salazar consolidated political authority around the institutions of the Estado Novo.

== See also ==
- National Syndicalism
