= Luís de Almeida Braga =

Portuguese writer and politician

Luís Carlos de Lima de Almeida Braga (20 October 1890 – 27 February 1970) was a Portuguese writer and politician who has one of the leading figures within the Integralismo Lusitano movement.

== Early years ==
Born in Braga, Almeida Braga first came to politics whilst a student at the University of Coimbra where he was active in the cause of monarchism. Forced into exile in 1911 following a crackdown on such activity, he feld to Belgium where he continued his studies at Ghent University and the Université libre de Bruxelles. The journal that he founded, Alma Portuguesa, was an early basis for integralist development and he produced it in exile until he was amnestied in 1916. Whilst in exile Almeida Braga was also involved in translating Portuguese language literature into French, including some of the works of Gil Vicente.

== Integralism ==
He was involved in the failed monarchist uprising of 1919 and afterwards became, along with his close ally Alberto Monsaraz, one of the leading advocates for the claims of Duarte Nuno, Duke of Braganza. Although a prolific writer he was not a main leader of the integralist movement and spent much of the 1920s out of Portugal, notably in Brazil. Whilst there his writings found an audience and helped to bring about the development of Brazilian Integralism. As one of the group's leading thinkers he set out to convert Portugal's elite to the new, somewhat Maurrasian, political ideology, particularly focusing on the young in their quest for support.

== Under Salazar ==
In 1932, by then settled back in Portugal, he joined with José Hipólito Raposo in launching the journal Integralismo Lusitano as an attempt to redefine their older ideas in the Portugal of António de Oliveira Salazar. The initiative was not a success. Unlike some former integralists Almeida Braga did not like Salazar and his last active involvement in politics saw him campaign in the 1958 Presidential election for Salazar's opponent Humberto Delgado.

== Written works ==
- O Culto da Tradição, 1916.
- Mar Tenebroso, 1918.
- Paixão e Graça da Terra, 1932.
- Sob o Pendão Real, 1942.
- Posição de António Sardinha, 1943.
- A Revolta da Inteligência, 1944.
- Nuvens sobre o Deserto, 1954.
- Espada ao Sol, 1969.
