= José Hipólito Raposo =

Portuguese politician, writer, lawyer and historian

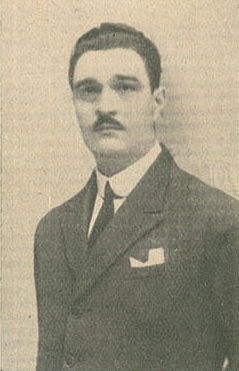
José Hipólito Raposo, 1922

José Hipólito Vaz Raposo (13 February 1885 – 26 August 1953) was a Portuguese politician, writer, lawyer and historian born in São Vicente da Beira.

== Integralism ==
He was educated at the University of Coimbra before taking up practice as a lawyer. He was part of a conservative monarchist group active within the intelligentsia when, in 1911, he took a trip to Paris with his friend Alberto Monsaraz and whilst there, they established contact with Action Française with whom they shared many aims. He joined with Monsaraz, António Sardinha, João do Amaral and José Adriano Pequito Rebelo in relaunching the monarchist journal A Nação Portuguesa in 1913. From this basis he became the founder of Integralismo Lusitano that same year along with Monsaraz and Sardinha. Raposo became known as one of the main ideologues of the new group and as a theorist he had a deep influence on Plínio Salgado who frequently referenced his works.

== Fascism ==
In the early 1920s Raposo also became close to a minor group known as Cruzada Non'Alvares, which was the first group in Portugal to openly endorse Benito Mussolini and Italian fascism. Like others in the integralist movement Raposo also keenly watched the development of the National Syndicalist Movement but, although he personally had some sympathies towards the cause of national syndicalism, he did not follow the likes of Monsaraz in switching to the new movement. However, despite his flirtations with fascism Raposo, unlike Sardinha, had no truck with the racialist theories associated with Nazism and similar ideologies and indeed considered the Black African populations of colonies such as Portuguese Angola and Portuguese Mozambique to be as much Portuguese as himself.

== Later years ==
His influence faded following the emergence of António de Oliveira Salazar and his final attempt to push the integralist line, by launching a journal entitled Integralismo Lusitano with Luís de Almeida Braga in 1932, was not a success. Having initially been ambivalent in his attitudes towards Salazar, Raposo decided in 1940 that the dictator was ruining Portugal and published a book, Amar e Servir, in which he savaged the Estado Novo founder.

== Writing ==
His 1947 book Dona Luísa de Gusmão, duquesa e rainha (1613-1666) is still recognised as the standard biography of Luisa de Guzmán. As a writer he also published poetry, theatre criticism, fiction and essays on the academic traditions of the University of Coimbra.
