= António Sardinha =

- Born: António Maria de Sousa Sardinha; 9 September 1887; Monforte, Portugal
- Died: 10 January 1925 (aged 37); Elvas, Portugal
- Occupations: Politician, historian and poet

António Sardinha (9 September 1887 – 10 January 1925) was a Portuguese writer and leading theorist of the movement known as Integralismo Lusitano. His worldview was strongly conservative.

== Early politics ==
Sardinha studied law at the University of Coimbra and graduated in 1911. During his student years, he was a supporter of republicanism and briefly of anarcho-syndicalism, but by 1911 he had become a strong advocate of monarchism and Catholicism, partly because of the influence of his highly conservative mother. He was also influenced in this regard by the Spanish conservative Juan Vázquez de Mella, who was a close friend of Sardinha from the early 1900s.

== Integralism ==
He helped found the Integralismo Lusitano movement in 1913, along with José Hipólito Raposo and Alberto de Monsaraz. He would serve as a deputy for a time under the Presidency of Sidónio Pais, who was vaguely sympathetic towards Integralism.

Sardinha was this group's foremost ideologue and his programme was outlined in his 1925 work, A Aliança Peninsular, which called for a regression in Iberia and a new Catholic corporatism that recalled the work of Charles Maurras. This was a highly nationalist and ruralist work was seen in Spain as a basis for the concept of a Hispanidad. His writings revealed a strong affinity for agriculture as a historical and economic basis, and also for anti-Semitism. His anti-Semitism was influenced by Action Française, from whom he also took a strong strain of anti-liberalism. He added to his ideology a hard-line racism, strongly criticising miscegnation. This element of his ideology was rejected by some within the movement, most notably José Hipólito Raposo. Further to this Sardinha also grafted elements of the works of Georges Sorel, adopting his theories of revolutionary validity and the social value of myth to his own ideology.

Under Sardinha's direction the movement converted from being a group of monarchist nostalgics into a coherent ideology that hoped to establish a new era in Portuguese history under the leadership of a strong centralised monarchy. Unlike some of his contemporaries Sardinha considered a close relationship to Spain to be of central importance for Portugal and he also took an internationalist view in general, hoping to see similar integralisms develop elsewhere, particularly in Brazil where that proved to be the case.

His early death in 1925 saw Integralismo Lusitano lose its most celebrated thinker and as a movement it failed to recover from the blow. Drawing from traditional monarchism, Hispanidad, ruralism, Integralism, scientific racism, fascism and national syndicalism he had created a complex syncretic ideology that inevitably fissured into various factions after his death.

== Historian ==
As well as his political activism Sardinha was also noted as a somewhat controversial historian. Much of his work was given over to a historical revisionism that sought to counter liberal interpretations of history. Amongst his pet theories was that António de Araújo e Azevedo, 1st Count of Barca had collaborated with France during his time as Minister of Foreign Affairs during the Peninsular War. Similarly he rejected the widely celebrated Portuguese discoveries as ushering in an era of capitalism and cosmopolitanism and thus flying in the face of his ruralist ideals.
