= 1911 Portuguese National Constituent Assembly election =

- 28 May 1911

All 234 seats in the National Constituent Assembly 118 seats needed for a majority
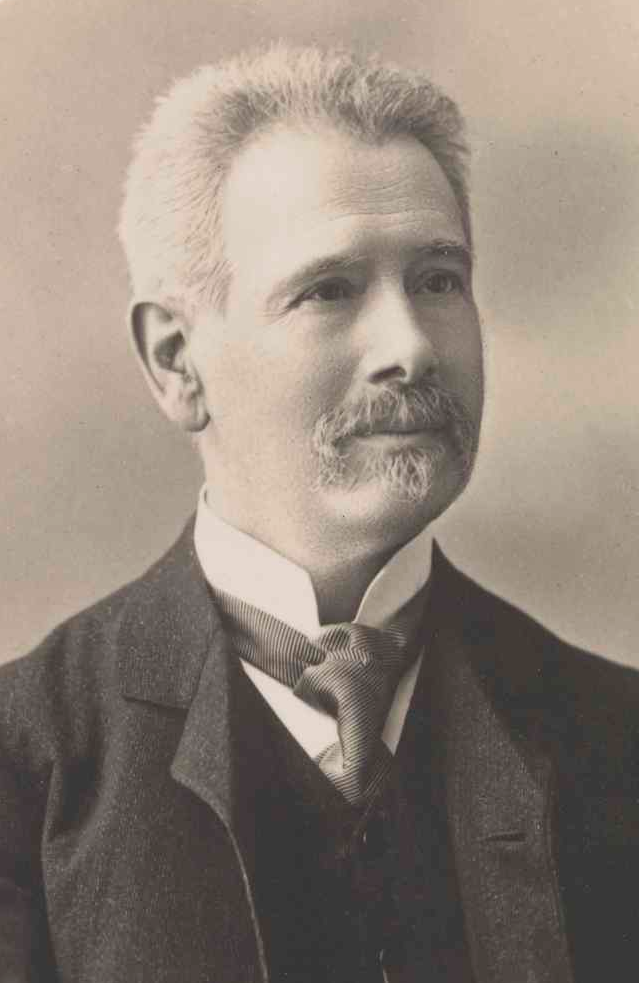

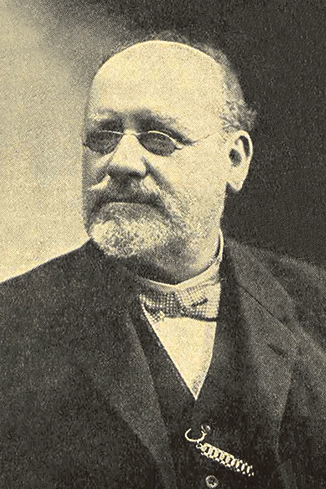
	First party	Second party
Leader	Teófilo Braga	Azedo Gneco
Party	Republican	Socialist
Seats won	229	2
Prime Minister before election
Teófilo Braga
Republican
Prime Minister after election
Teófilo Braga
Republican

National Constituent Assembly elections were held in Portugal on 28 May 1911 following a coup in October 1910. The result was a victory for the Portuguese Republican Party, which won 229 of the 234 seats.

== Electoral system ==
The country was divided into 51 constituencies for the elections. Lisbon elected 20 members from two 10 member seats using proportional representation and the d'Hondt method, whilst Porto had one 10 member constituency using the same system. The remaining seats were elected from 48 constituencies with three or four members using limited voting.

Property qualifications for voters were abolished and suffrage was extended to all adults who were either literate or heads of their households, as well as soldiers, who had previously been barred from voting. Bankrupts and "vagabonds" were excluded from the electoral roll.

Candidates for the election had to be literate, and could not run in more than one seat. Party lists had to obtain a certain number of signatures in every constituency (100 in Lisbon and Porto and 25 in other constituencies) in order to contest the election.

== Parties ==
The table below lists the parties that contested the elections:

Party		Ideology	Position	Leader
PRP	Portuguese Republican Party; Partido Republicano Português	Republicanism; Radicalism	Centre	Teófilo Braga
PSP	Portuguese Socialist Party; Partido Socialista Português	Socialism; Proudhonism	Left-wing	Azedo Gneco

== Results ==
Party	Votes	%	Seats
Portuguese Republican Party			229
Portuguese Socialist Party			2
Independents			3
Total			234
Registered voters/turnout	846,801	–	
Source: Nohlen & Stöver

Parliamentary seats
Republicans	97.86%
Socialist Party	0.85%
Others	1.31%

== Aftermath ==
The 1911 constitution was subsequently drawn up, which provided for a bicameral parliament and a president elected by a two-thirds vote in parliament. This constitution provided that the Assembly would partition itself into two bodies to form the first parliament: 71 of its members would form the Senate, while the remaining membership would become the Chamber of Deputies.
