= List of constituent assemblies =

This is an incomplete list of constituent assemblies:

National constituent assemblies
Name	Country	Formation and dissolution	Notes
The Council of Twenty-Five Barons and another	England	1215	Adopted Magna Carta, which forced King John to recognize certain rights of barons
Christliche Vereinigung	Swabian League	1525	Adopted the Twelve Articles.
United States Constitutional Convention	United States	1787	Adopted the United States Constitution.
Great Sejm	Poland-Lithuania	1788–1792	Adopted the Constitution of May 3, 1791, which was undone by the Targowica Confederation and a Russian invasion ending in the Second Partition of Poland
National Constituent Assembly; Assemblée nationale constituante	France	1789–1791	Formed during the French Revolution and adopted the French Constitution of 1791.
National Assembly of the Batavian Republic	Batavian Republic	1797–1798	
Constituent Assembly of the Batavian Republic	Batavian Republic	1798	
Cortes of Cádiz	Spanish Empire	1810–1813	Adopted the Spanish Constitution of 1812.
Constituent Assembly; Grunnlovsforsamlingen	Norway	1814	Adopted the current Constitution of Norway after the Treaty of Kiel forced Denmark to sell Norway to Sweden
Congress of Vienna; Wiener Kongress	German Confederation	1814–1815	International conference of European states chaired by Prince Klemens von Metternich after the Napoleonic Wars. Adopted the German Federal Act creating the German Confederation to replace the Holy Roman Empire.
Federal Convention; Bundesversammlung	German Confederation	1819–1820	Adopted the Wiener Schlussakte.
General and Extraordinary Cortes of the Portuguese Nation Cortes Gerais e Extraordinárias da Nação Portuguesa	Portugal	1821–1822	Adopted the Portuguese Constitution of 1822.
First National Assembly at Epidaurus; Α' Εθνοσυνέλευση της Επιδαύρου	Greece	1821–1822	Convened during the Greek War of Independence and adopted the Greek Constitution of 1822.
National Congress; Congrès national Nationaal Congres	Belgium	1830	Elected after the Provisional Government of Belgium had proclaimed independence during the Belgian Revolution, adopted the Constitution and appointed the first King of the Belgians, dissolved after the first Belgian Parliament was elected
General, Extraordinary and Constituent Cortes Cortes Gerais, Extraordinárias e Constituintes	Portugal	1837-1838	Adopted the Portuguese Constitution of 1838.
Constituent Assembly; Assemblée constituante	Luxembourg	1848	Adopted the Constitution of Luxembourg after being elected, and then replaced by the first Chamber of Deputies
Danish Constituent Assembly; Den Grundlovgivende Rigsforsamling	Denmark	1848–1849	Adopted the June Constitution
Prussian National Assembly; Preußische Nationalversammlung	Prussia	1848	Convened during the German revolutions of 1848–1849 but dissolved by royal decree when King Frederick William IV imposed the Prussian Constitution of 1848
Imperial Diet; Reichstag	Austria	1848–1849	Convened after the Revolutions of 1848 in the Austrian Empire and adopted the Kremsier Constitution.
Konstituierender Landtag	Oldenburg	1848–1849	Adopted the Staatsgrundgesetz von Oldenburg.
Frankfurt Parliament; Frankfurter Nationalversammlung	Germany	1848–1849	Adopted the Frankfurt Constitution.
Erfurt Union Parliament; Erfurter Unionsparlament	Germany	1849–1850	Adopted the Erfurter Unionsverfassung.
Imperial Council	Austria	1860	Adopted the October Diploma in the aftermath of Austria's defeat in the Second Italian War of Independence
Imperial Council	Austria	1861	Adopted the February Patent.
Constituent Reichstag; Konstituierender Reichstag	North German Confederation	1867	Adopted the North German Constitution in the aftermath of the Austro-Prussian War
Bulgarian Constituent Assembly; Учредително събрание	Bulgaria	1879	Adopted the Tarnovo Constitution.
Privy Council Constituent Conference 枢密院憲法会議; Sūmitsu-in kenpō kaigi	Japan	1888	Enacted the Meiji Constitution.
National Constituent Assembly; Assembleia Nacional Constituinte	Portugal	1911	Elected on 28 May 1911, following 5 October 1910 Portuguese Republican Revolution and adopted the Constitution of Portugal.
All-Russian Constituent Assembly; Всероссийское Учредительное собрание	Russia	1918	Elected after the October Revolution of 1917, but dissolved within 13 hours of its convocation on the orders of the Bolshevik-controlled All-Russian Central Executive Committee
Ukrainian Constituent Assembly (Ukrainian: Українські Установчі Збори)	Ukrainian People's Republic	1917–1918	Elected 29 November 1917 and dissolved due to the Soviet–Ukrainian War
Constituent Assembly; Assemblée constituante	Luxembourg	1918–1919	
Constituent Assembly; Verfassunggebende Landesversammlung	most of States of Germany	1918–1921	Adopted the state constitutions (Landesverfassungen).
Weimar National Assembly; Weimarer Nationalversammlung	Germany	1919–1920	Enacted the Weimar Constitution in 1919, bringing into being the Weimar Republic.
Constituent Assembly of Georgia საქართველოს დამფუძნებელი კრება	Georgia	1919–1921	Elected in 1919 and enacted the 1921 constitution.
Constituent Assembly; Asutav Kogu	Estonia	1919–1920	On 15 June 1920 adopted the first Constitution of the Republic of Estonia, according to which Estonia was a parliamentary democratic republic.
Constitutional Assembly; Konstituierende Nationalversammlung	Austria	1919–1920	Enacted the Constitution of Austria
Syrian National Congress المؤتمر السوري العام al-Mu’tamar al-Sūrī al-‘Ām	Syria	1919–1920	Elected in 1919 following the defeat of the Ottoman Empire, adopted the Syrian Constitution of 1920.
Constitutional Assembly of Latvia; Satversmes sapulce	Latvia	1920–1922	Adopted the Constitution of Latvia
Constituent Assembly of Lithuania; Steigiamasis Seimas	Lithuania	1920–1922	Elected in 1920 and enacted the 1922 constitution.
Constituent Assembly; Verfassungsgebende Versammlung	Danzig	1920–1923	Adopted the Constitution of the Free City of Danzig.
Cuban Constitutional Assembly	Cuba	1928–1930	
Constituent Assembly الجمعية التأسيسية al-Jim‘īyah al-Tā’sīsīyah	Syria	1928–1929	Drafted the 1930 constitution, the founding constitution of the First Syrian Republic under the French Mandate.
National Constituent Assembly 制憲國民大會; Chih-hsien Kuo-min Ta-hui; Zhìxiàn Guómín Dàhuì	China	1946	Also known as the Constituent National Assembly, enacted the Republic of China's current constitution in 1946.
National Constituent Assembly; Asamblea Nacional Constituyente	Venezuela	1946	Held after a coup which launched El Trienio Adeco.
Constituent Assembly or Appointed Landtag; Verfassunggebende Landesversammlung or Ernannter Landtag	most of States of Germany	1946–1956	Adopted the Landesverfassungen.
Constituent National Assembly	Czechoslovakia	1946–1948	Formed after 1946 election until coup d'état in February 1948 and led to adoption of Ninth-of-May Constitution.
Constituent Assembly of Italy; Assemblea Costituente della Repubblica Italiana	Italy	1946–1948	Formed on 25 June 1946 following the referendum on republic or monarchy, dissolved the adoption of the Constitution, on 12 May 1948.
Constituent Assembly of India	India	1946–1950	Formed on 9 December 1946 to write the Constitution, and serve as India's first Parliament upon independence from the British Empire, dissolving on 26 January 1950 when India became a republic.
People's Assembly of North Korea 북조선인민회의 北朝鮮人民會議; Bukjoseon Inmin Hoeui	North Korea	1947–1948	Enacted the Constitution of North Korea, and launched elections for the 1st Supreme People's Assembly, which in turn adopted the constitution.
Constituent National Assembly of the Republic of Korea 대한민국 제헌 국회 大韓民國制憲國會; Daehanminguk Jeheon Gukhoe	South Korea	1948–1950	Adopted the Constitution of South Korea, and served as the first National Assembly.
Constituent Assembly of Costa Rica; Asamblea Nacional Constituyente de Costa Rica	Costa Rica	1949	Acting between January and November 1949, wrote the current Costa Rican Constitution.
German People's Congress; Deutscher Volkskongress	East Germany	1947–1949	Convened by the Socialist Unity Party of Germany and adopted the Constitution of East Germany to take effect in Soviet-occupied eastern Germany
Parlamentarischer Rat	West Germany	1949	Adopted the Basic Law for the Federal Republic of Germany to take effect in the Western Allied zones of occupation.
Israeli Constituent Assembly	Israel	1948–1950	
Constituent Assembly الجمعية التأسيسية al-Jim‘īyah al-Tā’sīsīyah	Syria	1949–1950	Elected in 1949 and adopted the 1950 constitution, the founding constitution of the Second Syrian Republic, which reintroduced civilian rule following a series of military governments, and served as the national legislature.
National Constituent Assembly; Asamblea Nacional Constituyente	Venezuela	1952	Military junta blocked the final results from being published and installed General Marcos Pérez Jiménez as Provisional President.
Constituent Assembly of Indonesia; Konstituante	Indonesia	1956–1959	Elected in 1955, and sitting between 10 November 1956 and 2 July 1959, when the previous 1945 constitution was reimposed
Constituent Assembly of Pakistan	Pakistan	1947	Formed on 10 August 1947 to write the Constitution, and serve as Pakistan's first parliament. It was dissolved on 24 October 1954 and reconstituted after fresh elections on 28 May 1955, lasting until 23 March 1956 when Pakistan became a republic.
Constituent Assembly	Turkey	1961	Adopted the Turkish Constitution of 1961.
Constituent and Parliamentary Assembly المجلس التأسيسي والنيابي al-Majlis al-Tā’sīsī wa al-Nīyabī	Syria	1961–1962	Elected in 1961 and adopted the Syrian Constitution of 1962 following Syria’s secession from the United Arab Republic, and served as the national legislature.
Constituent Assembly of Bangladesh	Bangladesh	1972	Formed in 1972 to draft the Constitution.
Constituent Assembly; Assembleia Constituinte	Portugal	1975–1976	Elected on 25 April 1975, following the Carnation Revolution, and enacted the current Constitution.
Turnhalle Constitutional Conference	(South Africa) Namibia	1975–1977	
Assembly of Experts for Constitution	Iran	1979	Adopted the Constitution of the Islamic Republic of Iran.
Constitutional Assembly of Peru	Peru	1978–1980	Condoned by the military dictatorship of General Francisco Morales Bermúdez Cerruti following paralyzing national strikes of May 1978 and June 1979, it produced a new constitution for Peru with many new civil liberties and was followed by new elections and a return to democratic rule in 1980.
Constituent Assembly of El Salvador	El Salvador	1982	Elected in 1982 as a provisional parliament and presidential electoral college, and charged with drafting the Constitution.
National Constituent Assembly; Assembléia Nacional Constituinte	Brazil	1987–1988	Established on February 1, 1987, in the newly elected Congress to draft a new Constitution, following 21 years of a military government. The assembly was dissolved on September 22, 1988, when the document was adopted.
Constituent Assembly of Namibia	Namibia	1989–1990	Adopted the Constitution of Namibia.
Constituent Assembly of Bulgaria	Bulgaria	1990–1991	Adopted the Constitution of Bulgaria.
National Constituent Assembly; Asamblea Nacional Constituyente	Colombia	1991	Formed on 5 February 1991 to draft the country's constitution. It was dissolved in July 1991 when the document was adopted nationwide.
Constitutional Assembly of Estonia	Estonia	1992	Set up in 1992 consisted of an equal number of members from the Supreme Soviet of the Estonian SSR and the Congress of Estonia.
Democratic Constitutional Congress; Congreso Constituyente Democrático	Peru	1992–1993	Convened by Alberto Fujimori in 1992 to draft a new constitution.
Constitutional Assembly of South Africa	South Africa	1993	Established by the Constitution of South Africa, 1993 (Interim Constitution) to adopt a final constitution. The Parliament of South Africa acted in the capacity of the Constitutional Assembly until the Constitution of South Africa, 1996 was adopted.
Volkstaat Council	South Africa	1994–1999	
National Constituent Assembly; Asamblea Nacional Constituyente	Venezuela	1999	Adopted the Constitution of 1999.
European Convention	European Union	1999–2003	Adopted the Charter of Fundamental Rights of the European Union.
Iraqi Constituent Assembly	Iraq	2005	Elected on 30 January 2005, after the collapse of the dictatorship of Saddam Hussein, caused by the U.S. invasion, adopted the Constitution of the new democratic, parliamentary and regional Iraq, approved by a referendum of 15 October 2005.
Constituent Assembly of Montenegro	Montenegro	2006–2007	Elected in 2006 to replace the old Yugoslav constitution, enacted the current constitution on 22 October 2007.
Constituent Assembly; Asamblea Constituyente	Bolivia	2006–2007	Approved the new Political Constitution of the State on 9 December 2007. It was put to a national referendum held on 25 January 2009, and went into force on 7 February 2009.
Constituent Assembly; Asamblea Constituyente	Ecuador	2007–2008	Which is to draft the future constitution of Ecuador – to be established according to the results of the referendum held on 15 April 2007.
First Constituent Assembly of Nepal नेपालको पहिलो संविधान सभा	Nepal	2008–2012	Following the end of the Nepalese Civil War and after several postponements it was elected on 10 April 2008. The first session was scheduled on 28 May 2008 upon which Nepal should be declared a republic.
Loya jirga (Grand assembly)	Afghanistan	2010	Afghanistan traditional large council to settle major conflict or enact constitutional change.
Constituent Assembly of the Philippines	Philippines		
Icelandic Constitutional Assembly; Stjórnlagaráð	Iceland	2010–2013	Summoned by an act of Althingi, the Icelandic parliament, on 16 June 2010 for the purpose of reviewing the Constitution of the Republic.
Constituent Assembly of Tunisia	Tunisia	2011–2014	
Constitutional Assembly of Ukraine; Конституційна Асамблея	Ukraine	2012	A special auxiliary agency under the president of Ukraine set up in May 2012 for drawing up bills of amendments to the Constitution of Ukraine; the president then will table them in parliament.
Constituent Assembly	Egypt	2012–present	
National Constituent Assembly; Asamblea Nacional Constituyente	Venezuela	2017–2020	Disputed elections approved during the 2017 Venezuelan constitutional crisis.

International constituent assemblies
Name	Year	Location	Notes
Peoples' World Convention (PWC) Peoples' World Constituent Assembly	1950	Geneva, Switzerland	Convened to discuss the world problems and draft a world constitution
World Constitutional Convention (WCC) First World Constituent Assembly	1968	Interlaken, Switzerland and Wolfach, Germany	Convened to draft a world constitution for the Federation of Earth
Second World Constituent Assembly	1977	Innsbruck, Austria	Adopted the 'Constitution for the Federation of Earth'
Third World Constituent Assembly	1978-79	Colombo, Sri Lanka	For amendments to the 'Constitution for the Federation of Earth'
Fourth World Constituent Assembly	1991	Tróia, Portugal	For amendments to the 'Constitution for the Federation of Earth'
