= Constituent National Assembly =

Constituent National Assembly may refer to:

Historical

- National Constituent Assembly (France) (1789–1791)
- Constituent National Assembly (Costa Rica) (1824), which established, among other institutions, the Supreme Court of Justice of Costa Rica
- National Constituent Assembly (Portugal) (1911–1913)
- Constituent National Assembly (Austria) (1919–1920)
- National Constituent Assembly (France, 1945) (1945–1946)
- National Constituent Assembly (France, 1946) (1946)
- Constituent National Assembly (Czechoslovakia) (1946–1948)
- 1946 Constituent National Assembly of Venezuela (1946–1947)
- Constituent National Assembly (South Korea) (1948–1950)
- 1952 Constituent National Assembly of Venezuela (1952–1953)
- Brazilian Constituent Assembly (1988), also called National Constituent Assembly (1987–1988)
- 1999 Constituent National Assembly of Venezuela (1999)
- 2017 Constituent National Assembly of Venezuela (2017–2020)

== See also ==
- Constituent assembly, including examples of national constituent and constitutional assemblies
- List of constituent assemblies
