= Constitution of 1911 =

Constitution of 1911 may refer to:

- Greek Constitution of 1911
- Monegasque Constitution of 1911
- Portuguese Constitution of 1911
