= Braamcamp Freire =

Portuguese historian, genealogist, and politician

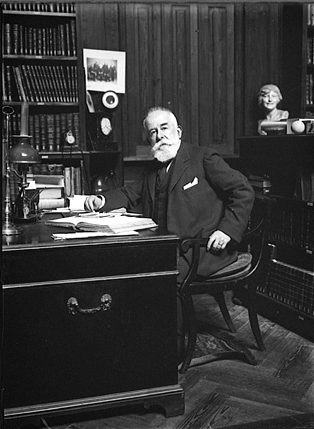
Anselmo Braamcamp Freire

Anselmo Braamcamp Freire (Lisbon, 1 February 1849 – Lisbon, 23 December 1921) was a Portuguese historian, genealogist and politician. A member of the National Constituent Assembly, he became the first president of the (Second) Portuguese Senate. While a historian, he authored a notable study of the life of Vasco da Gama. His house in Santarém is now the city's municipal library.
