= Iamdudum =

1911 papal encyclical

Iamdudum Latin for 'Long since' Encyclical of Pope Pius X
- Signature date: 24 May 1911
- Subject: On the Law of Separation in Portugal
- Number: 15 of 17 of the pontificate
- Text: In Latin; In English

Iamdudum (on the law of separation in Portugal) is an encyclical of Pope Pius X, promulgated on May 24, 1911, which condemned Portuguese anticlericals for their deprivation of religious civil liberties in the wake of the 5 October 1910 revolution and the "incredible series of excesses and crimes which has been enacted in Portugal for the oppression of the Church."

The revolution and the republic which it spawned were anticlerical and had a "hostile" approach to the issue of church and state separation, like that of the French Revolution, the Spanish Constitution of 1931 and the Mexican Constitution of 1917. As part of the anticlerical revolution, the bishops were driven from their dioceses, the property of clerics was seized by the state, wearing of the cassock was banned, all minor seminaries were closed and all but five major seminaries. A law of February 22, 1918 permitted only two seminaries in the country, but they had not been given their property back. Religious orders were expelled from the country, including 31 orders comprising members in 164 houses (in 1917 some orders were permitted to reform). Religious education was prohibited in both primary and secondary school.

== See also ==
- Anticlericalism
