= Basílio Teles =

Portuguese writer

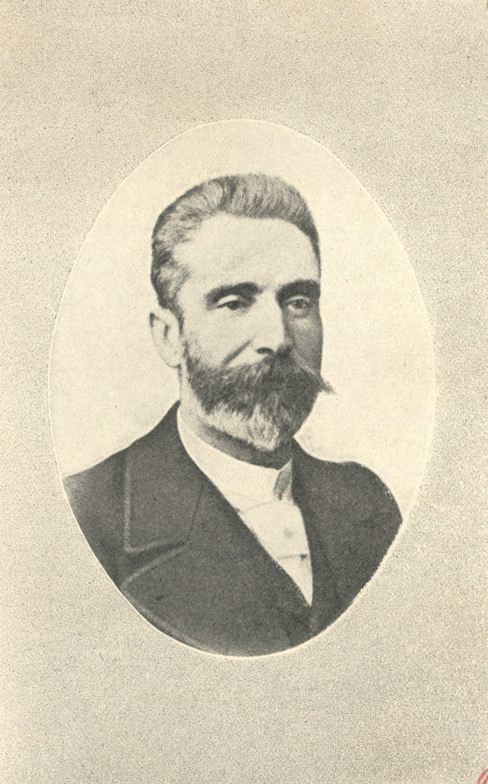
- Born: 14 February 1856; Porto, Portugal
- Died: 10 March 1923 (aged 67); Portugal
- Occupations: Author, professor and politician

Basílio Teles (14 February 1856 – 10 March 1923) was a Portuguese author.
