= Constitution of Portugal (1911) =

Fourth constitution of Portugal

A Nação Portuguesa, organizada em Estado Unitário, adopta como forma de Governo a República, nos termos desta Constituição

The Portuguese Nation, organized in Unitary State, adopts as form of Government the Republic, in (the) terms of this Constitution

— Article 1

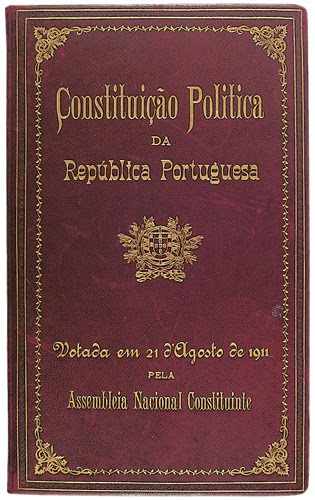
Cover of the Constitution of Portugal of 1911

The Constitution of Portugal of 1911 (Portuguese: Constituição Política da República Portuguesa, lit. 'Political Constitution of the Portuguese Republic') was the fourth constitution of Portugal and the first Republican constitution of the Country.

On 11 March 1911 the Provisional Government of the Portuguese Republic published a new electoral law (replacing the 1895 Law). The elections to the National Constituent Assembly took place on 28 May 1911. This electoral law greatly restricted the right to vote, compared to its predecessor.

226 Members of the Assembly were elected, most of whom were assigned to the Portuguese Republican Party, the protagonist of the Republican Revolution. The Assembly began its work on 19 June 1911. The President of the Assembly was Anselmo Braamcamp Freire. During the inaugural session, the Assembly declared the Monarchy abolished and reiterated the proscription of the Bragança family and recognized all political acts of the Provisional Government, and thereafter elected a Commission to prepare a draft of the constitution.

The Constitution was approved on 21 August 1911.

== Structure ==
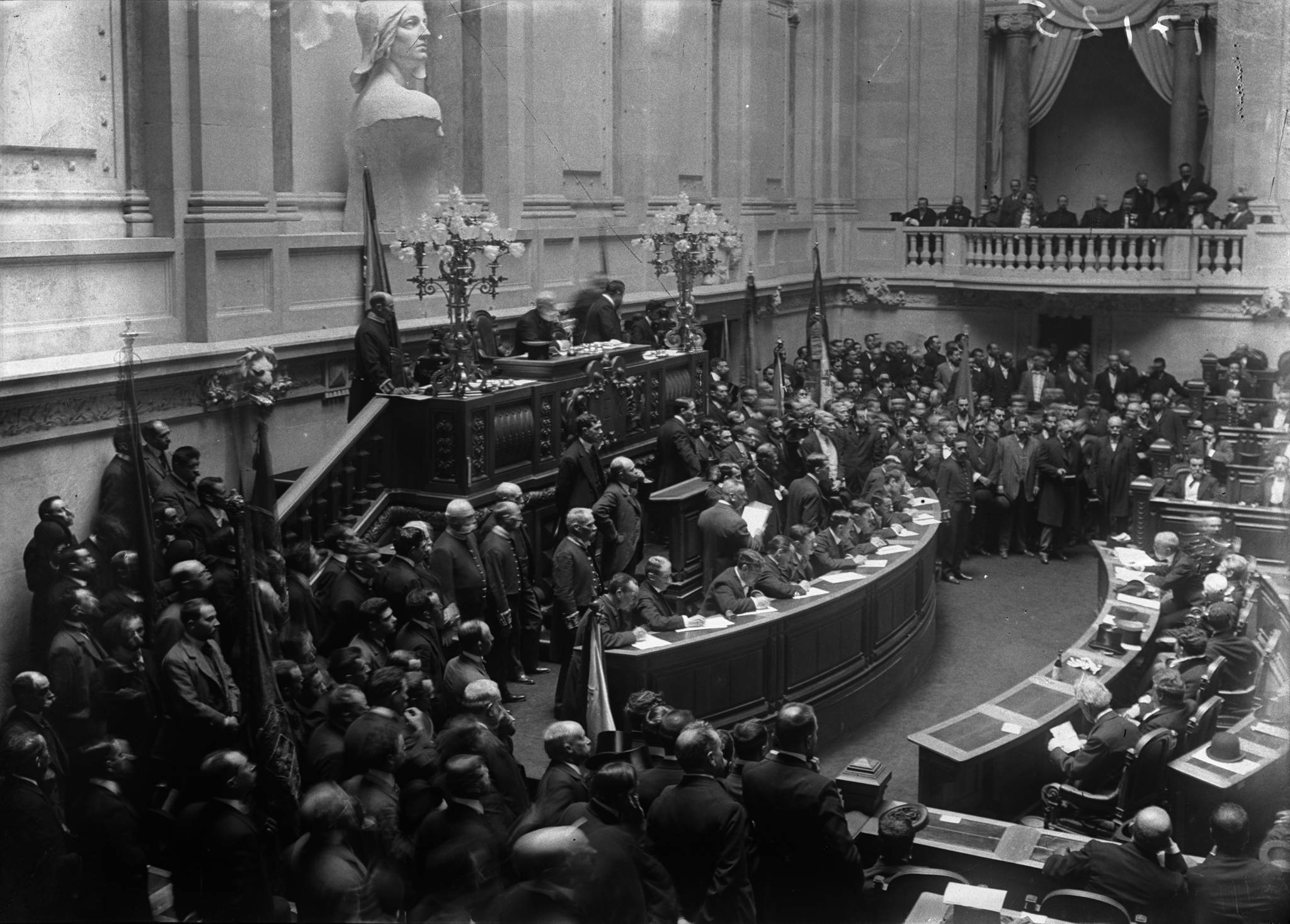
The National Constituent Assembly

The Political Constitution of the Portuguese Republic of 1911 has only 87 articles grouped into seven titles, namely:

- Form of the Government and of the Territory of the Portuguese Nation
- Individual rights and guarantees
- Sovereignty and State Power
- Local administrative institutions
- Administration of the Overseas Provinces
- General Provisions
- Constitutional Revision

== See also ==
- Constitution of Portugal
