= Azedo Gneco =

Portuguese political activist (1849–1911)

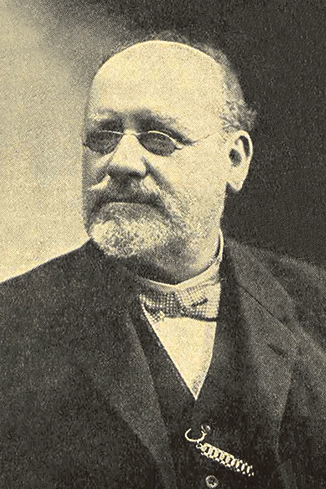
Azedo Gneco, Portuguese Socialist

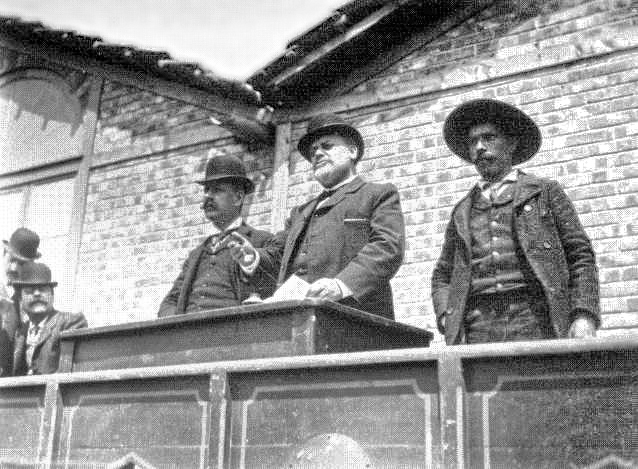
Azedo Gneco at a republican gathering in Lisbon in 1907

Eudóxio César Azedo Gneco (21 June 1849 in Samora Correia, Benavente – 29 June 1911 in Lisbon), better known as Azedo Gneco, was a Portuguese engraver, medalist, apprentice sculptor and political activist, of Italian ancestry. An orator and journalist, he was one of the founders of the Portuguese Socialist Party in 1875 and one of its first leaders.

With international ties to Spain and the Caribbean he was able to connect various groups through his work. He led the Association of Workers of the Portuguese Region (Portuguese: Associação dos Trabalhadores da Região Portuguesa—ATRP), formed in 1873, and the National Confederation of Class Associations (Portuguese:Confederação Nacional das Associações de Classe—CNAC), which was formed in 1894 and united thirty-seven labour unions.
