= Portuguese Socialist Party =

Defunct political party in Portugal

Portuguese Socialist Party Partido Socialista Português
- Abbreviation: PSP
- Leader: Azedo Gneco
- Founded: 10 January 1875
- Banned: March 1933
- Headquarters: Lisbon
- Newspaper: Heraldo
- Ideology: Socialism
- Political position: Left-wing
- International affiliation: Second International; Labour and Socialist International
- Colors: Red

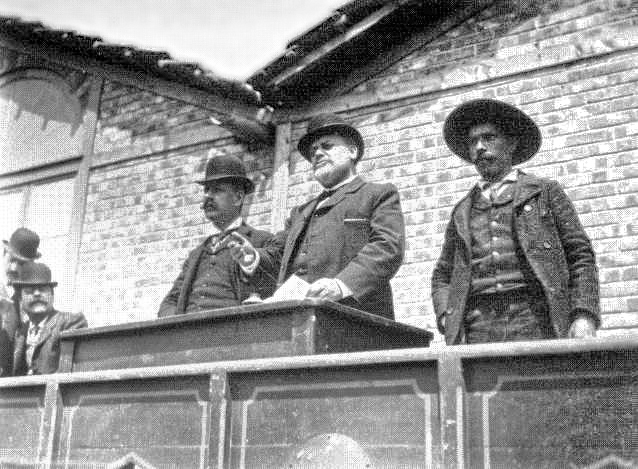
Portuguese Socialist Party leader Azedo Gneco speaking at a May 1 meeting, 1907

The Portuguese Socialist Party (Portuguese: Partido Socialista Português) was a Portuguese political party.

== History ==
The party was founded in 1875. During its initial phase, it was heavily influenced by Proudhonism and rejected revolutionary Marxism. In 1919 the left-wing of the party broke away (that group would merge with anarcho-syndicalists to form the Portuguese Maximalist Federation, which became the Portuguese Communist Party). The Socialist Party lacked mass support. The trade union movement was led by anarchists and was not affiliated with the socialist International Federation of Trade Unions.

The party claimed a membership of 2,500 as of 1925. It published the biweekly Heraldo. It had an educational and workers' sport organization, with a membership of 3,000. The headquarters of the party were located in Lisbon.

The party won two seats in the parliamentary elections of 1911, 1912, 1915 and 1925.

The party was a member of the Labour and Socialist International between March 1925 and 1933.

After the military coup of May 1926, the Socialist Party was the only tolerated political party. Initially the party adopted a passive tactic towards the military dictatorship. The party sharply distanced itself from the republic uprising in February 1927. The national conference of 1930 decided that the party should openly cooperate with the government. One of the main leaders of the party at the time, Ramado Curto, was commissioned by the government to formulate a labour code. From 1930 he worked with the reformist trade unions in the corporativist National Economic Committee. After the establishment of Estado Novo by António de Oliveira Salazar in March 1933 the party was banned. The party responded by dissolving itself.
