= National Constituent Assembly (Portugal) =

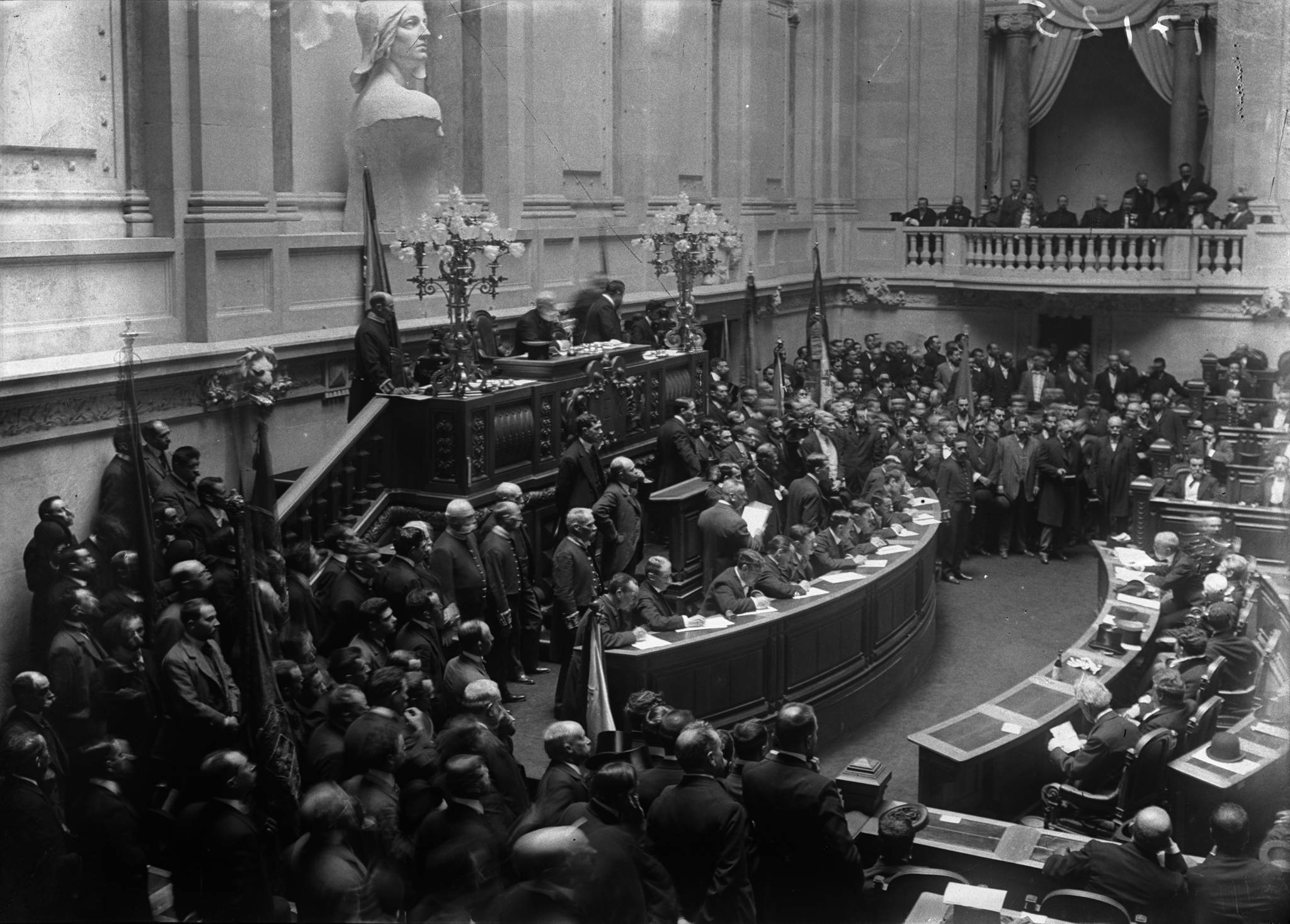
The National Constituent Assembly

The National Constituent Assembly of Portugal (Portuguese: Assembleia Nacional Constituinte) was the assembly elected on 28 May 1911 to prepare and vote the constitution of the First Portuguese Republic. The Constitution of Portugal was approved on 21 August 1911.
