= Fort São Neutel =

Coordinates: 41.75006186582236°N 7.467674816616899°W

- Forte de São Neutel
- Chaves, Vila Real District, Portugal
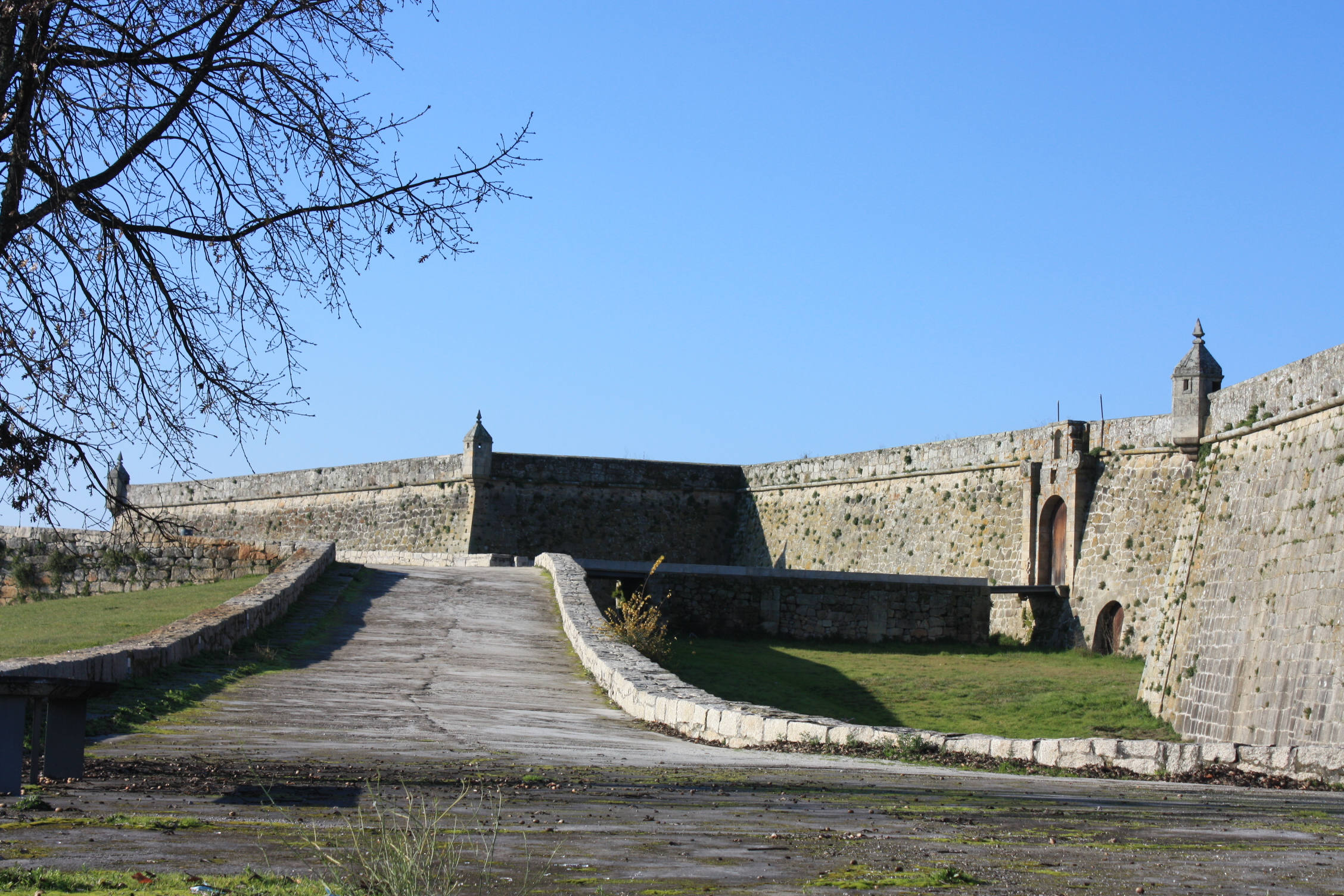

Site information
- Type: Bastion fort

Site history
- Built: 1664 and 1668
- In use: 17th-21st century
- Events: Portuguese Restoration War, Peninsular War

Fort São Neutel is located in the Parish of Santa Maria Maior of the city of Chaves, District of Vila Real, in Portugal.

It complemented the defence provided by Fort São Francisco to the city of Chaves, on the hill to the north, by the border with Galicia.

The São Neutel Fort has been classified as a National Monument since 1938.

== History ==
Construction of the fort took place between 1664 and 1668, in the context of the War of Restoration of Independence, when the stockade at Alto da Trindade was converted to stone and the fort built by the Governor of Arms of the Province of Trás-os-Montes, General Andrade e Sousa.

It was the scene of combat, in 1912, between monarchists led by Paiva Couceiro and the newly established republican regime during the Royalist attack on Chaves.

Starting in 1925 the fort served as the civil jail for the municipality of Chaves.

The fort belongs to the Portuguese Army and, for that reason, was normally closed to visitors. A protocol between the Portuguese Army (Direção de Infra-Structuras do Exército, DIE) and the Municipality of Chaves grants the use of the space. In the 1980s, the intervention of the public authorities, through the Directorate-General for National Buildings and Monuments (DGEMN), led to various improvement works being carried out (1981, 1987). In 1994, an amphitheater for concerts and other outdoor activities was built inside the fort by the Municipality of Chaves.

== Features ==
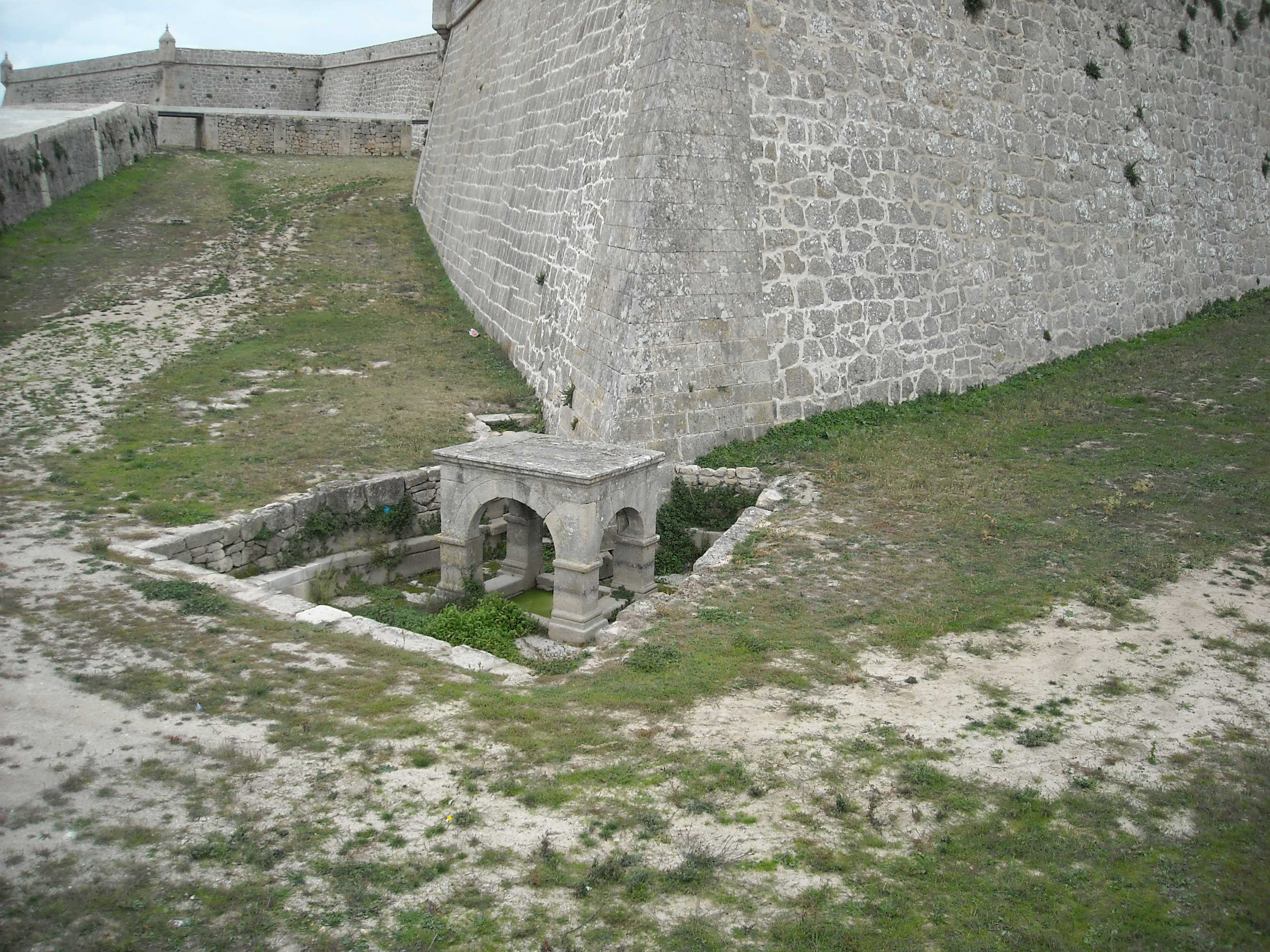
Fountain at São Neutel

The fort has a square shape that is adapted to the terrain, with bastions at the edges, in the Vauban style, surrounded by a dry moat and a second defensive line.

Access to the fort is made via a solid stone bridge, which connects the outer wall to the gate-of-arms.

The granite walls are one meter to one and a half meters thick, with a height that varies from seven to ten meters.

Inside, the Chapel of Nossa Senhora das Brotas stands out, built before the fort, whose Lady is honored annually, on Easter Sunday, with a procession and feast. It has a unique altar with the image of São Neutel, with that of Senhora das Brotas (persistence of an ancient pagan cult of Ceres) represented in a painting suspended on the side wall. Behind the chapel, there are barracks that used to house the veteran soldiers of the former Battalion of Caçadores nº 10.

== See also ==
- Peninsular War
