= Fort São Francisco of Chaves =

Fort São Francisco
- Forte de São Francisco
- Chaves, Vila Real District, Portugal
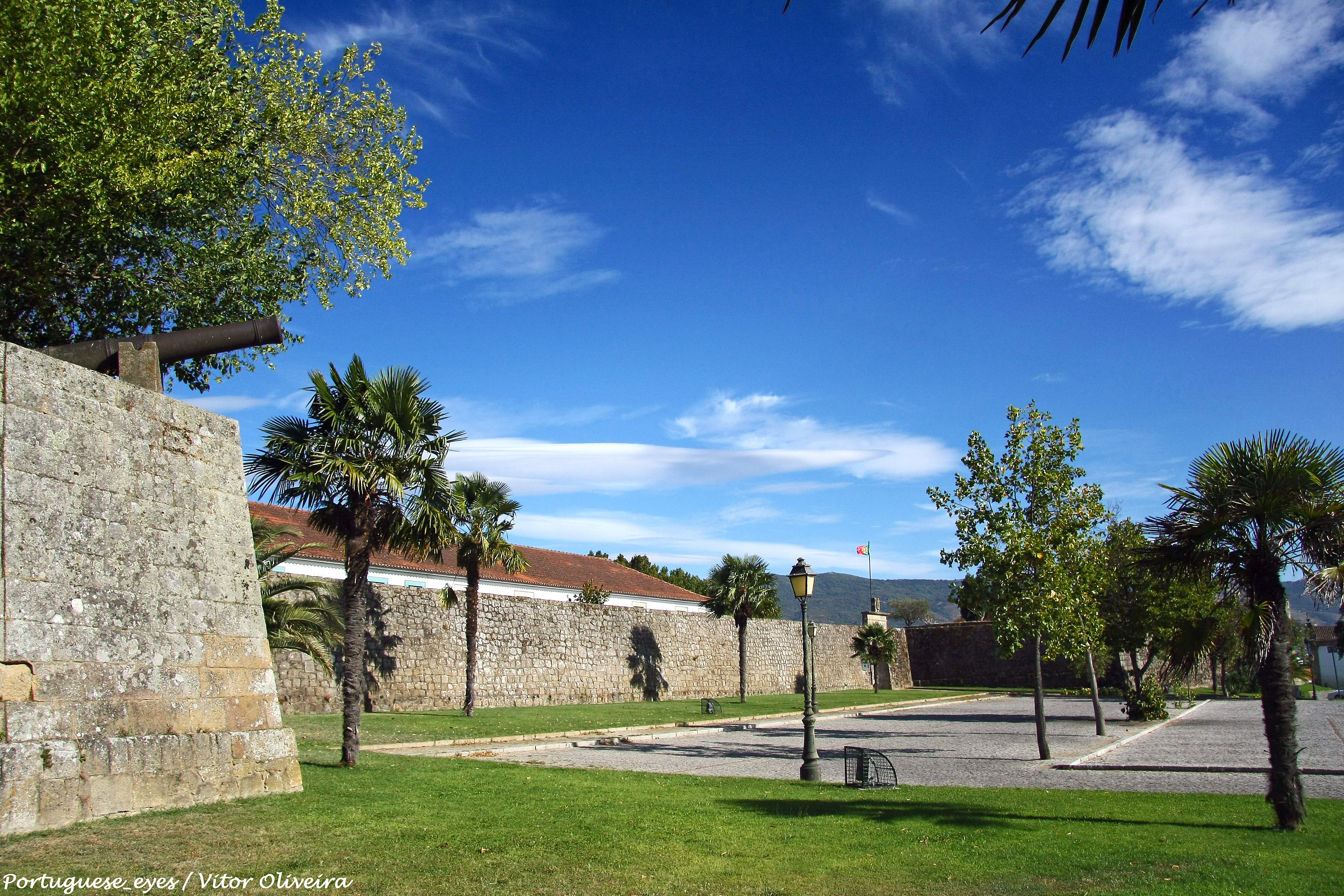

Site information
- Type: Bastion fort

Location
- Coordinates: 41°44′35″N 7°28′09″W

Site history
- Built: 1644 and 1647
- In use: 17th–21st century.
- Events: Portuguese Restoration War, Peninsular War

The Fort Nossa Senhora do Rosário, better known as Forte São Francisco of Chaves is located in the city of Chaves, in the Parish of Santa Maria Maior, District of Vila Real, in Portugal.

Together with Fort São Neutel, this fort, in a dominant position on the Pedisqueira hill, next to the Tâmega river and the old Roman bridge, was intended to defend Chaves, on the Galician border, at the time of the Restoration War.

The São Francisco Fort has been classified as a National Monument since 1938.

== History ==
The fort dates back to a Franciscan monastery – the Monastery of Nossa Senhora do Rosário – built in the early 16th century, which lent it its official name. According to a deed signed with Friar Rodrigo de Morais in 1446, it was designed by Mestre Joanes de Cibrão who created the vault of the Convent.

=== Fort Nossa Senhora do Rosário ===
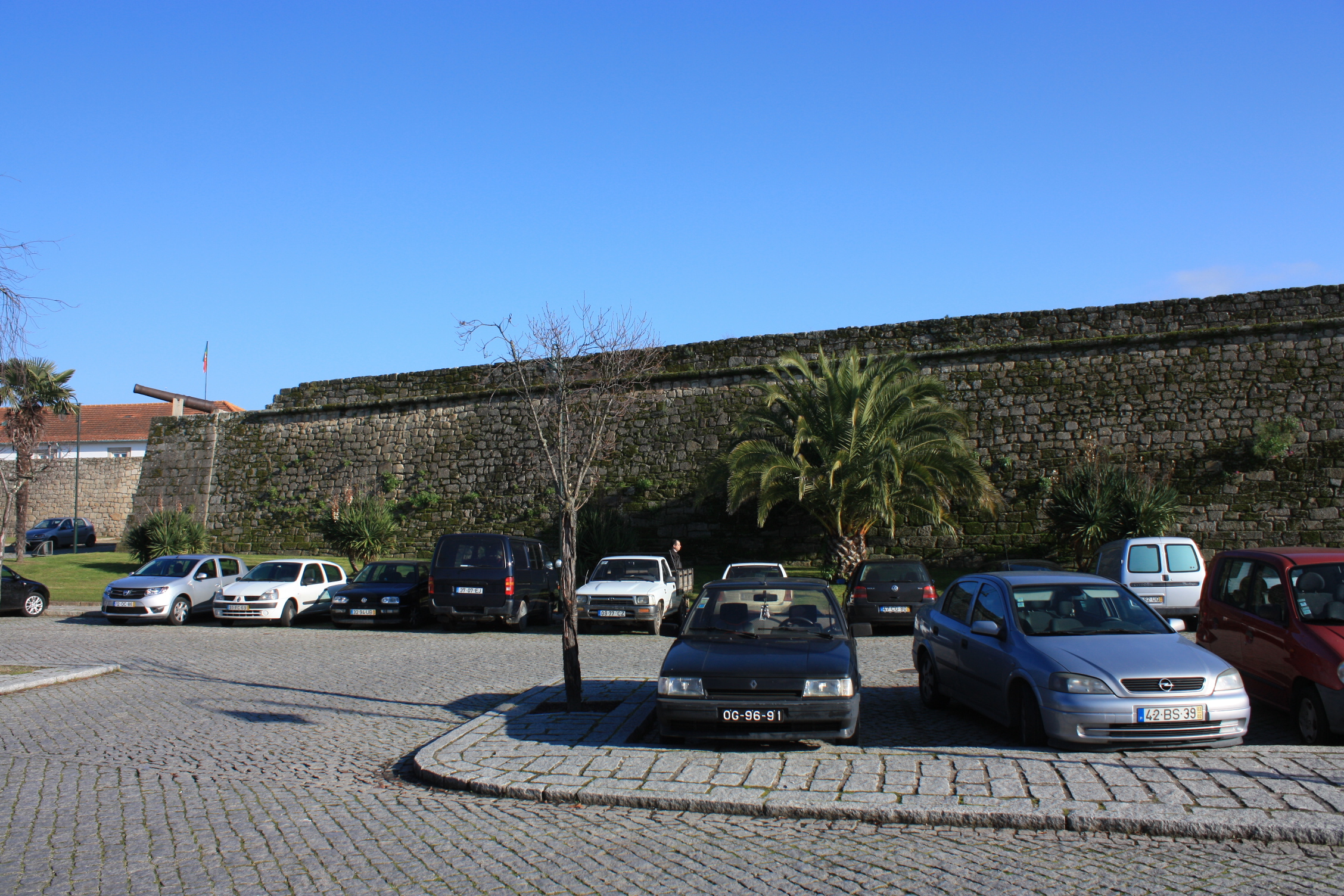
Curtain

In the context of the War of Restoration of Independence, recognizing the importance of the city's strategic position, next to the border, the modernization of its medieval defenses was enacted. In order to prevent the neighboring hills from being occupied by enemy artillery batteries, these positions were fortified.

On the hill of Pedisqueira, where the old Franciscan Convent used to be, it was decided to surround it with bulwarked walls, transforming it into a fort. The works were carried out under the orders of the Governor of the Arms of the Province of Trás-os-Montes, Dom João de Sousa da Silveira, between 1644 and 1647. The defense works of Chaves were complemented with the construction of new walls connecting the fort to the old medieval walls, reinforced or rebuilt at the time, surrounding the neighborhoods that had expanded outside the medieval walls. The defense was extended to the old Roman bridge over the Tâmega, whose access, on the opposite bank, was also fortified, with the construction of the Madalena Ravelin.

=== Napoleonic Wars ===
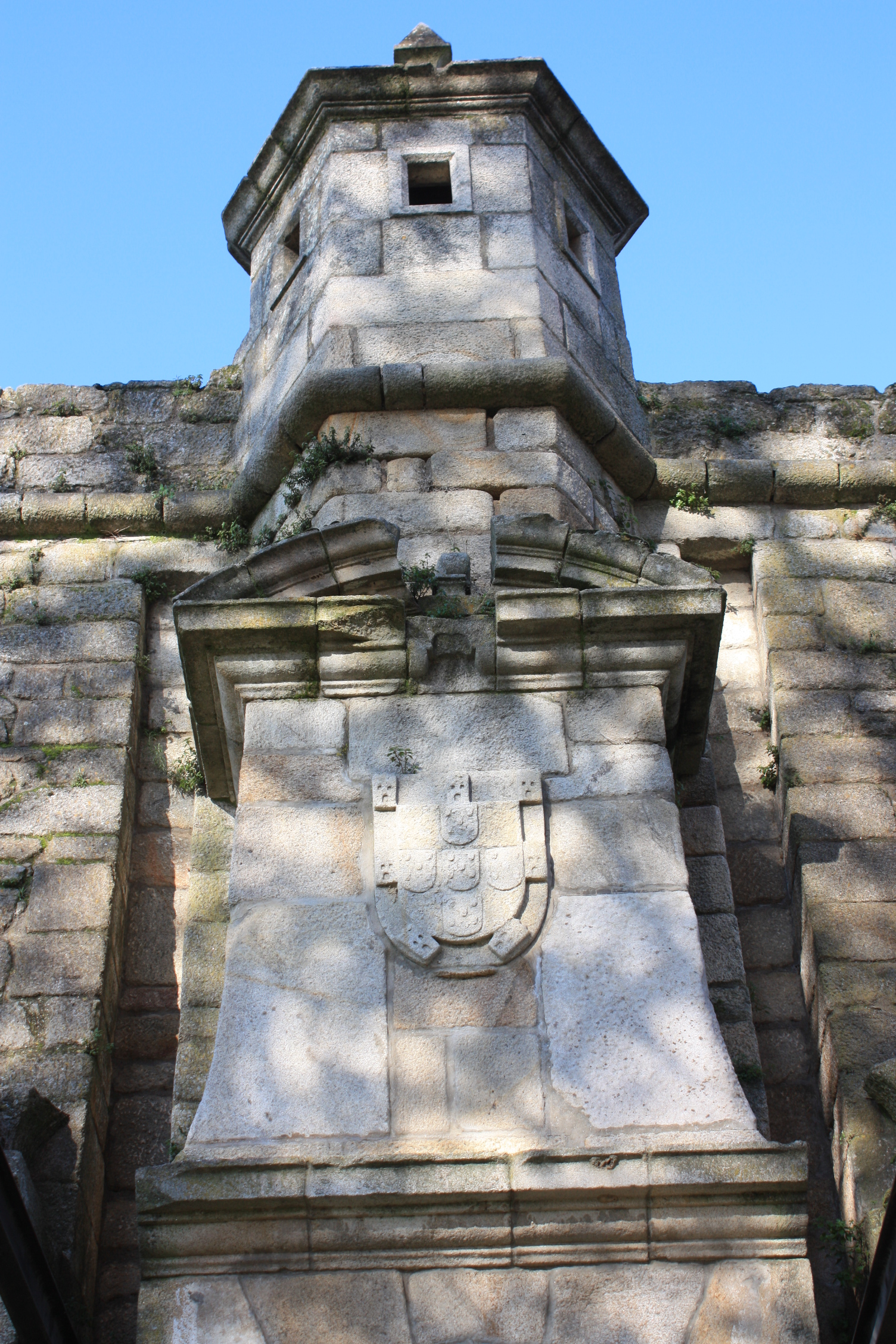
Stone-of-arms

At the beginning of the 19th century, during the Peninsular War, Chaves and its defenses were not in a position to defend themselves. After several clashes with Napoleonic troops under the command of Marshal Soult, the Portuguese troops, under the command of General Francisco da Silveira Pinto da Fonseca Teixeira, retreated to strategic points, leaving the city with a small garrison under the command of Lieutenant Colonel Pizarro. These forces, as well as the militiamen who faced the enemy, were captured but then released. The São Francisco Fort was used as the French headquarters at the time, and, in this capacity, it was the target of General Silveira's counter-offensive, in March 1809. After four days of violent fighting, the French garrison surrendered in 25, and Chaves was liberated.

Subsequently, it was still the scene of struggles during the Liberal Wars and, later still, in 1910, when the Portuguese Republic was proclaimed.

Having lost its defensive function, after housing the 10th Battalion of Caçadores for almost seventy years, the fort's dependencies were abandoned, falling into disrepair.

=== 20th century–present ===
It is classified as a National Monument by Decree No. 28,536, published on March 22, 1938.

The intervention of the public authorities, through the Directorate-General for National Buildings and Monuments (DGEMN) began in 1957, when conservation works were promoted. Several stages of consolidation, cleaning, clearing, repair and reconstruction took place in the following decades, until, on January 16, 1989, the São Francisco Fort was ceded, on a precarious basis, to the Municipality of Chaves. In the second half of the 1970s, the fort's facilities served as temporary housing for families fleeing from the recently independent Portuguese provinces in Africa.

In 1994, the fort's facilities were reclassified as a hotel, a development promoted by Sociedade Forte de S. Francisco, Hoteis, Ldª, with a project by Architect Pedro Jalles. The Forte de São Francisco Hotel, opened in May 1997, is classified with four stars. It offers fifty-three rooms to visitors, bar and restaurant, tennis court, swimming pool and sauna.

== Features ==
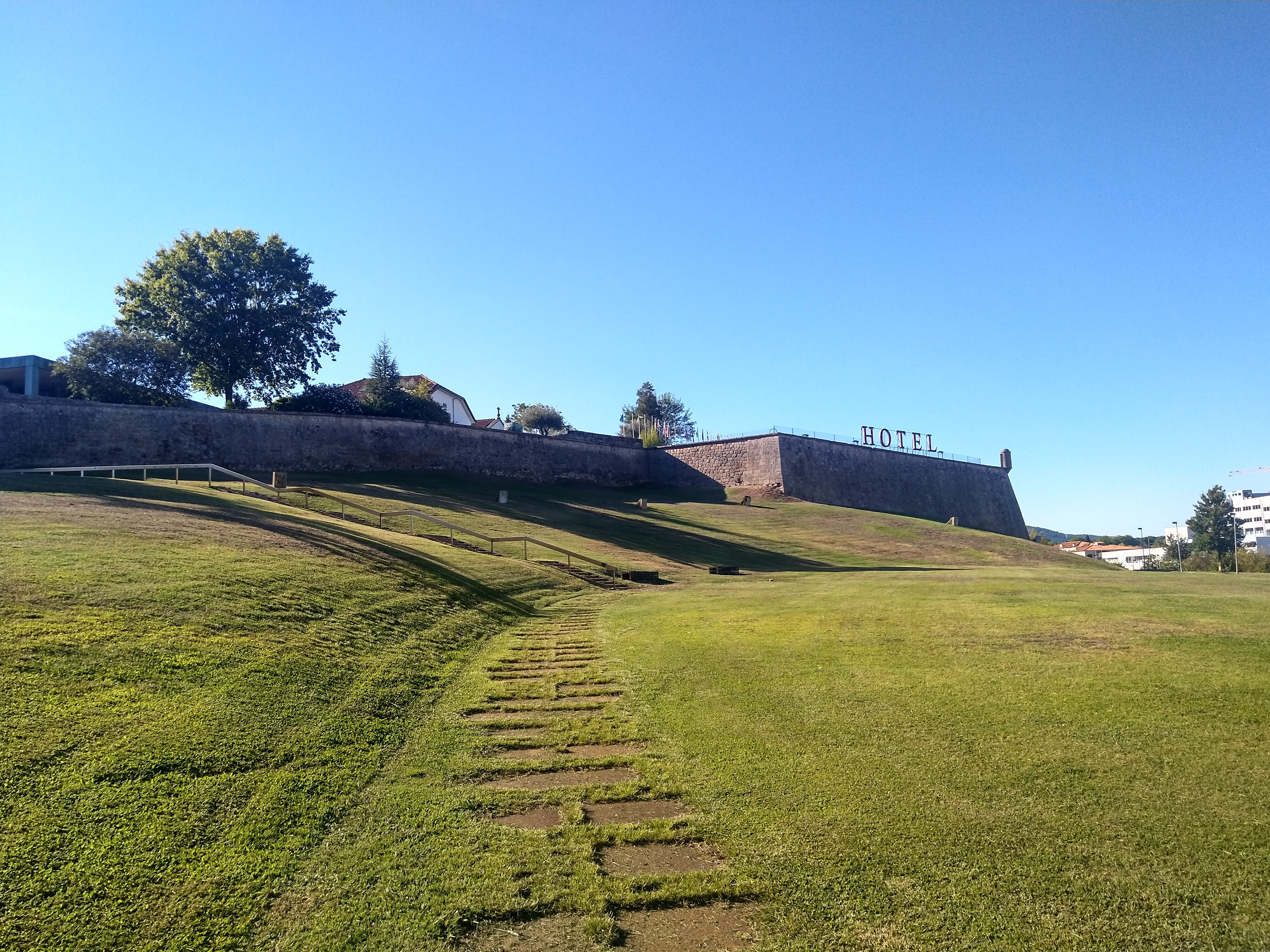
Distant view

The fort has a simple star-shaped plan, with four bastions at the vertices, in the Vauban system. The walls, with a thickness of one meter, vary between four and twenty meters in height and are covered in granite.

The main access is through a gate on the south side, through a drawbridge over the moat, which is currently backfilled. There are secondary accesses on the East and West sides, all leading through tunnels to the Field-of-Arms.

Among the buildings inside the fort, the old São Francisco Chapel stands out, which for three centuries, until 1942, housed the tomb of D. Afonso, first Duke of Bragança, restored and well preserved.

A bronze plaque stands beside the main gate, which reads:

On the day of March 25 of 1809 General Silveira, with the troops and the militias / of Trás-os-Montes under his command, stormed and captured the stronghold of Chaves / garrisoned by French troops of the army of Soult, which / having sought refuge in this fort, were forced to surrender unconditionally in the day / of 25, after close combats in the days of 21 and 24. / Celebrating the deed in its 100th birthday, the municipium, the people / and the garrison of Chaves dedicate this plaque to the memory of the heroes who / fought for the liberation of the homeland

== See also ==
- Peninsular War
- Royalist attack on Chaves
