= Tamagnini =

Tamagnini is a surname. Notable people with the surname include:

- Alberto Tamagnini (2002–), Sammarinese alpine ski racer
- Fernando Tamagnini de Abreu e Silva (1856–1924), Portuguese general and commander of the Portuguese Expeditionary Corps in World War I
- Filippo Tamagnini (1972–), Sammarinese politician
- João Tamagnini Barbosa (1883–1948), Portuguese military officer and politician
- Lucia Tamagnini (1963–) Sammarinese politician
- Nené (1949–), real name Tamagnini Manuel Gomes Batista, Portuguese footballer
- Roberto Tamagnini (1942–), Sammarinese sports shooter
- Torquato Tamagnini (1886–1965), Italian sculptor and medallist
- Vittorio Tamagnini (1910–1981), Italian bantamweight boxer
