= Lucia Tamagnini =

Sammarinese politician

Mayor of Acquaviva
- Incumbent
- Assumed office 2013
- Preceded by: Loretta Mazza

Personal details
- Born: 23 October 1963 (age 62) City of San Marino, San Marino

Lucia Tamagnini (born 23 October 1963) is a Sammarinese politician, Mayor (Capitano di Castello) of Acquaviva since 20 March 2013, when Loretta Mazza resigned.

Tamagnini was born in City of San Marino on 23 October 1963. She was elected city councillor in the 2009 Acquaviva local election.

Her candidacy named Together for Acquaviva won the 2014 local election as was the only candidacy and received the 100% of the valid votes.
