= Maria Teresa Beccari =

Sammarinese politician (1950–2020)

Mayor of the City of San Marino
- In office 13 December 2009 – 31 October 2018
- Preceded by: Alessandro Barulli
- Succeeded by: Tomaso Rossini

Personal details
- Born: 26 June 1950
- Died: 7 May 2020 (aged 69)

Maria Teresa Beccari (26 June 1950 – 7 May 2020) was a Sammarinese politician. She served as mayor of the City of San Marino between 2009 and 2018.

== Career ==
Beccari was born on 26 June 1950. She was elected in the office after the 2009 local elections were repeated on November for City of San Marino.

In the 2014 Sammarinese local elections her candidacy, named Continuity and Innovation obtained the 52'9% of the votes and was reelected mayor. She resigned for personal reasons on 31 October 2018, and was succeeded by Tomaso Rossini.

== Death ==
Beccari died on 7 May 2020 at the age of 69 after a long illness. Her funeral was held on 12 May.
