= Loretta Mazza =

Sammarinese politician

- Born: Loretta Mary Grace Mazza; October 8, 1957 (age 68); New York City, New York, U.S.
- Occupation: Politician

Loretta Mary Grace Mazza (born 8 September 1957) is a Sammarinese politician, Mayor (Capitano di Castello) of Acquaviva between 2009 and 22 February 2013, when she resigned and was succeeded by Lucia Tamagnini on 20 March 2013.

Mazza was born in New York City, United States, on 8 September 1957.

She won the 2009 Sammarinese local elections in Acquaviva after receiving 415 votes.
