= Beccari =

Beccari is an Italian surname derived from the occupation of butcher. Notable people with the surname include:

- Andrea Beccari (born 1978), Italian freestyle swimmer
- Jacopo Bartolomeo Beccari (1682–1766), Italian physician and chemist
- Maria Teresa Beccari (1950–2020), Sanmarinese politician and mayor
- Odoardo Beccari (1843–1920), Italian naturalist
