= Aníbal Milhais =

Portuguese soldier

Aníbal Milhais GOTE
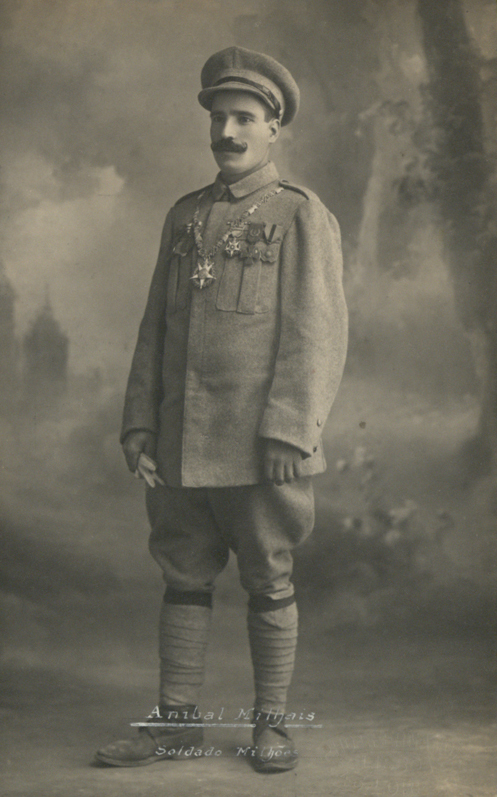
- Born: Aníbal Augusto Milhais; 9 July 1895; Murça, Portugal
- Died: 3 June 1970 (aged 74); Murça, Portugal
- Military career
- Allegiance: (Portugal) Portuguese Republic
- Branch: Portuguese Army
- Service years: 1915–1919
- Nickname: Soldado Milhões (Soldier Millions)
- Units: 2nd Infantry Division; Portuguese Expeditionary Corps
- Conflicts: World War I; Battle of the Lys
- Awards: Order of the Tower and Sword; Legion of Honour

Aníbal Augusto Milhais GOTE (Portuguese pronunciation: [ɐˈniβal awˈɣuʃtu miˈʎajʃ]; 9 July 1895 – 3 June 1970), nicknamed "Soldado Milhões" (Portuguese pronunciation: [solˈdaðu miˈʎõjʃ]; "Soldier Millions", for being "worth a million men"), was the most decorated Portuguese soldier of World War I and the only Portuguese soldier awarded the highest national honour, the Military Order of the Tower and of the Sword, of Valour, Loyalty and Merit, on the battlefield instead of the usual public ceremony in Lisbon.

== Origin ==
Milhais was a farmer; he was born on 9 July 1895 in the small village of Valongo de Milhais, a parish of Murça, in northern Portugal.

== War service ==
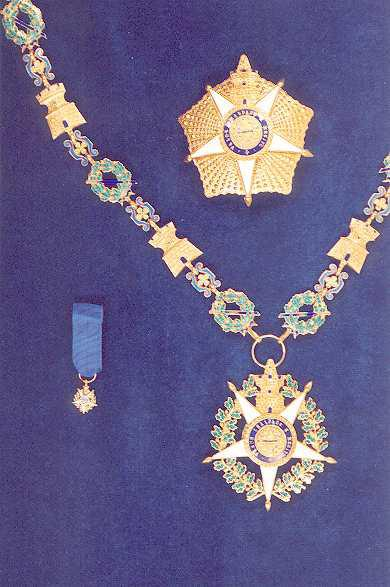
Badge, collar and star of the order

On 30 July 1915 he was drafted into the Infantry of Bragança. In 1917, he was mobilized to join the Portuguese Expeditionary Corps. He arrived in France in the same year, as a member of the Trás os Montes Brigade of the 2nd Infantry Division of the Expeditionary Corps. The division was deployed to the front line.

The participation of Portugal in World War I took place mostly in Flanders, Belgium. Portuguese soldiers volunteered to infiltrate enemy lines and raid trenches, even though the casualties on both sides for raids were extremely high. Three German divisions had been rotated in the sector facing the 2nd Division in the last nine months before April 1918. The division saw no major battles, but suffered many casualties and extreme fatigue among the front-line soldiers from consecutive night raids. The Portuguese were to have been rotated out of the line on the same morning that the Germans attacked.

On 9 April 1918 Milhais took part in the battle known in Portugal as "The Battle of La Lys" – the first day of Ludendorff's Lys Offensive, otherwise known as "Operation Georgette", and as the "Battle of Estaires" in official British history. He found himself in the midst of the battle, in the field of Isberg, covering the withdrawal of Portuguese and Scottish soldiers. Within a few hours, 1,938 men had been killed, 5,198 wounded and about 7,000 taken prisoner. Milhais was in charge of a Lewis gun. He laid down intense fire against assaults by two German regiments, inflicting many casualties. He managed to cover the retreat of Portuguese and Scots alike, despite coming under heavy attack himself. He fired in all directions and stayed at his post until he ran out of ammunition. Finally, the Germans decided to go around his position, and Milhais found himself alone in the rear of the enemy lines for three days. On the third day, Milhais, still carrying his Lewis gun, rescued a Scottish major from a swamp, and the two reached Allied lines. Milhais was warmly welcomed, but being a modest man, he did not say anything about his feats. However, the officer he had helped reported his actions to the British headquarters and several other testimonials also made his deeds known.

A few months later, Milhais once again held back a German assault single-handed with his Lewis gun, allowing a Belgian unit to retreat safely to a secondary trench without casualties. Both the British observers present in the scene and the Belgian commander included his action in their reports. Milhais was awarded the highest Portuguese distinction - the Order of the Tower and Sword - and the French Légion d'Honneur, awarded on the battlefield before 15,000 Allied soldiers.

On 15 July 1918 the Order of Service of the Battalion published a commendation, given by Major Ferreira do Amaral, which described his action as having been worth a million men, hence the nickname by which he became known: "Soldier Millions".

== After the war ==
Milhais in his hometown, shortly before his death

On 2 February 1919 he returned to his homeland and married Teresa de Jesus and had nine children with her. After the war ended, the Portuguese economy was near bankruptcy, and Milhais had difficulty providing for his family. The Portuguese government promised to help, but instead of an allowance, named the village where he was born after him. On 8 July 1924 the Parliament renamed the town of Valongo as Valongo de Milhais. The rather shy Milhais lived in the village of Valongo of Milhais, more famous than ever, but as poor as before. He received many decorations and much public praise, but the highly decorated soldier still could not provide for his family.

In 1928, he emigrated to Brazil in an attempt to improve his financial standing. The Portuguese community in Brazil received him as a hero. When the Portuguese living there realized that Milhais was in need, the community gathered funds to send him back to Portugal with enough money to provide for his family. The Portuguese public thought it a national indignity and were angry that the military had done little for Milhais.

On 5 August 1928 he returned to Portugal and to agriculture. He received a small pension, enough to live on as a national hero.

He died on 3 June 1970 in the village named after him.

== Legacy ==
- The village Valongo de Milhais was renamed after him on 8 July 1924.
- Some descendants of Milhais have adopted the surname Milhões.
- A permanent exhibition remembering his achievements can be seen in the Military Museum in the city of Porto. Furthermore, a statue in his honor was erected in his hometown as a national tribute and as a symbol for Portugal.
- The 2018 movie Soldado Milhões ("Soldier Millions", known in English as Courage Of One) was based on the biography of Aníbal Augusto Milhais.
