= La Serra =

Curazia of Acquaviva, San Marino

- Curazia
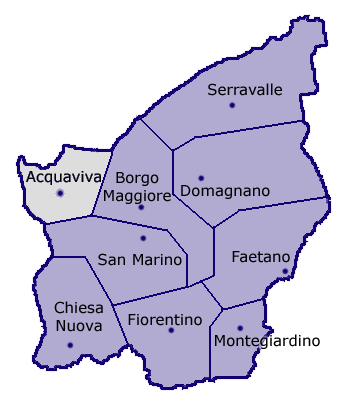
- Location of the castello of Acquaviva within San Marino

- Location within San Marino
- Coordinates: 43°57′25.4″N 12°25′19.9″E
- Country: San Marino
- Castello: Acquaviva
- Elevation: 450 m (1,480 ft)
- Demonym: gualdicciolesi
- Time zone: UTC+1 (CET)
  - Summer (DST): UTC+2 (CEST)
- Postal code: 47892
- Area code: +378 (0549)
- Climate: Cfa

La Serra is a curazia of San Marino, in the castello of Acquaviva.

== Location ==
This village is located in the northern part of the municipality of Acquaviva, and the only other village in Acquaviva is Gualdicciolo.

== Namesake ==
La Serra is named after a family that fled the Italian town of Pesaro in 1234 because of debts incurred by the head of household, Arnoldo La Serra.

== Accessibility ==
Due to the lack of road connections with the rest of the Republic of San Marino, this village is only reachable from Italy, via the municipality of Verucchio.
