= 2nd Division (Portugal) =

Part of the Portuguese Expeditionary Corps that fought in World War I

2ª Divisão do CEP 2nd CEP Division
- Active: 1917-1918
- Country: Portugal
- Allegiance: Portuguese Army
- Type: Division
- Size: 20 000
- Headquarters: La Gorgue, France
- Engagements: World War I Western Front; Battle of the Lys (1918)

Commanders
- Division commander (December 22, 1917, to March 21, 1918): General Simas Machado
- Division commander (March 21, 1918, to April 9, 1918): General Gomes da Costa

The 2nd Division was one of the two divisions of the Portuguese Expeditionary Corps (CEP, Corpo Expedicionário Português), the main military force of Portugal that fought in the World War I Western Front on the side of the Allies. The Division was under the command of General Simas Machado until March 1918, when it became under the command of General Gomes da Costa.

== History ==
On April 6, 1918, after heavy losses, the 1st Division was removed to the rearguard, leaving the 2nd Division (reinforced with the 6th Brigade from the 1st Division) as the sole CEP division on the front line. The 2nd division assumed the responsibility of all the Portuguese sectors, rearranged as the Fauquissart, the Neuve Chapelle and the Ferme du Bois sectors (11 km of front), now under the operational control of the British XI Corps.

The 2nd Division was also planned to be moved to the rearguard on April 9, 1918, on the same day German Army launched operation Georgette, the great offensive whose main thrust was precisely on the sectors defended by the Portuguese Division. In the resulting Battle of the Lys, the 20,000 Portuguese of 2nd Division suffered an assault from 100,000 Germans, supported by a heavy artillery bombardment. Despite stubborn resistance, the Portuguese Division was overrun and lost c. 7,000 casualties. From December 22, 1917, to April 6, 1918, the 2nd Division was responsible for the sectors of Fauquissart and Chapigny of the Portuguese Sector of the Western Front.
