= Battle of the Lys (1918) =

Part of WWI German offensive in Flanders

- Part of the Western Front of the First World War
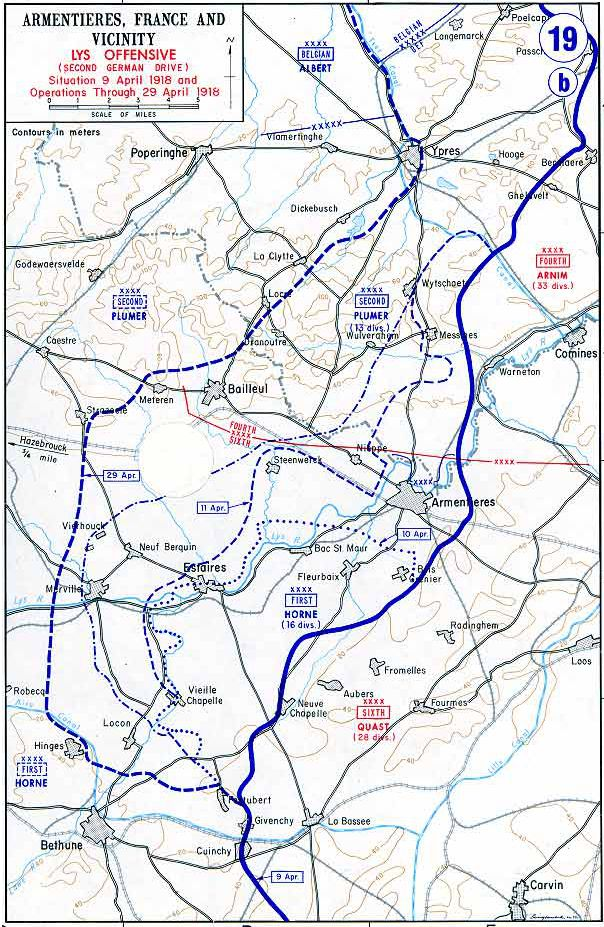
- German Lys offensive, 1918
Date	7–29 April 1918
Location	Flanders, Belgium to northeast France 50°42′20″N 2°54′00″E
Result	See § Analysis
Territorial changes	Germans penetrate British lines up to 9.3 mi (15 km)

Belligerents
British Empire; United Kingdom; Australia; Canada; Newfoundland; New Zealand; South Africa; France; Portugal; Belgium; United States	German Empire

Commanders and leaders
Douglas Haig; Herbert Plumer; Henry Horne; Philippe Pétain; Tamagnini de Abreu; Gomes da Costa; King Albert I; Cyriaque Gillain; Arthur Currie	Ludwig von Falkenhausen; Ferdinand von Quast; Friedrich Sixt von Armin

Strength
Unknown	35 divisions (~612,500)

Casualties and losses
118,300–119,040; 118 guns; 60 aircraft	86,000–109,300; 8 aircraft including the Red Baron

The Battle of the Lys, also known as the Fourth Battle of Ypres, was fought from 7 to 29 April 1918 and was part of the German spring offensive in Flanders during the First World War. It was originally planned by General Erich Ludendorff as Operation George but was reduced to Operation Georgette, with the objective of capturing Ypres, forcing the British forces back to the Channel ports and out of the war. In planning, execution and effects, Georgette was similar to (although smaller than) Operation Michael, earlier in the Spring Offensive.

== Background ==
=== Strategic developments ===
The German attack zone was in Flanders, from about 10 kilometres (6.2 mi) east of Ypres in Belgium to 10 kilometres (6.2 mi) east of Béthune in France, about 40 kilometres (25 mi) south. The front line ran from north-north-east to south-south-west. The Lys River, running from south-west to north-east, crossed the front near Armentières in the middle of this zone. The front was held by the Belgian Army in the far north, by the British Second Army (under Plumer) in the north and centre and by the British First Army (under Horne) in the south.

== Prelude ==
=== Tactical developments ===
The German attacking forces were the Sixth Army in the south (under Ferdinand von Quast), and the Fourth Army in the north (under Friedrich Sixt von Armin). Both armies included substantial numbers of the new Stoßtruppen, trained to lead attacks with the new stormtroop tactics.

The British First Army was a relatively weak force; it included several worn-out formations that had been posted to a "quiet sector". This included two divisions of the Portuguese Expeditionary Corps, which were undermanned, lacked almost half of their officers, had very low morale and were set to be replaced the day of the German attack.

=== German plan of attack ===
The German plan was to break through the First Army, push the Second Army aside to the north, and drive west to the English Channel, cutting off British forces in France from their supply line which ran through the Channel ports of Calais, Dunkirk and Boulogne.

== Battle ==
=== Battle of Estaires (9–11 April) ===
The German bombardment opened on the evening of 7 April, against the southern part of the Allied line between Armentières and Festubert. The barrage continued until dawn on 9 April. The Sixth Army then attacked with eight divisions. The German assault struck the Portuguese 2nd Division, which held a front of about 11 kilometres (6.8 mi). The Portuguese division was overrun and withdrew towards Estaires after hours of heavy fighting. (Note: This action was one of the greatest defeats ever suffered by Portuguese forces. The Portuguese Expeditionary Corps had been reorganising so that the 2nd Portuguese Division of General Gomes da Costa was to have four brigades at full strength and all the artillery of the corps and the 1st Portuguese Division, which would contain two depleted brigades and be withdrawn. The 2nd Division had a total of c. 21,000 men, of whom 17,000 were infantry, a deficit of 6,139 men; the division lost c. 7,000 casualties. Despite the defeat, acts of remarkable bravery were shown by some Portuguese soldiers; Aníbal Milhais (nicknamed "Soldier Millions") repulsed two German assaults single-handedly with a Lewis gun, while covering the retreat of Portuguese and Scottish troops.) The British 55th (West Lancashire) Division, to the south of the Portuguese in a more defensible position, pulled back its northern brigade and held its ground for the rest of the battle, despite attacks from two German reserve divisions. The British 40th Division (to the north of the Portuguese) collapsed under the German attack and fell back to the north.

Horne committed his reserves (First King Edward's Horse and the 11th Cyclist Battalion) to stem the German breakthrough but they too were defeated. The Germans broke through 15 kilometres (9.3 mi) of front and advanced up to 8 kilometres (5.0 mi), the most advanced probe reaching Estaires on the Lys. There they were finally halted by British reserve divisions. On 10 April, the Sixth Army tried to push west from Estaires but was contained for a day; pushing north against the flank of the Second Army, it took Armentières.

=== Battle of Messines (10–11 April) ===
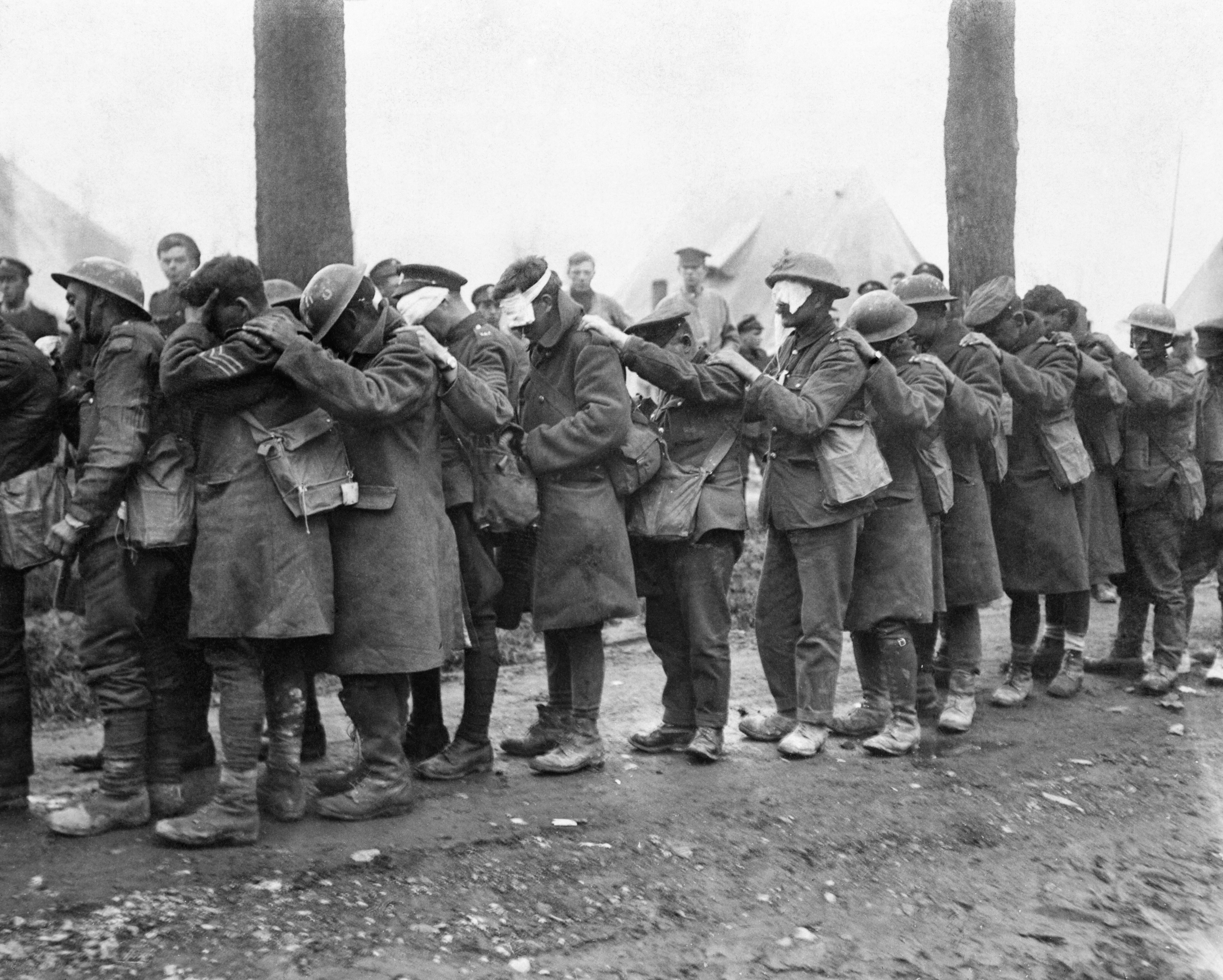
West Lancashire Division troops blinded by poison gas, 10 April 1918

Also on 10 April, German Fourth Army attacked north of Armentières with four divisions, against the British 19th Division. The Second Army had sent its reserves south to the First Army and the Germans broke through, advancing up to three kilometres (2 mi) on a six-kilometre (4 mi) front, and capturing Messines.

The 25th Division to the south, flanked on both sides, withdrew about four kilometres (2 mi). By 11 April, the British situation was desperate; it was on this day that Haig issued his famous "backs to the wall" order.

=== Battle of Hazebrouck (12–15 April) ===
On 12 April, the Sixth Army renewed its attack in the south, towards the important supply centre of Hazebrouck, another 10 kilometres (6.2 mi) to the west. The Germans advanced some 2–4 kilometres (1.2–2.5 mi) and captured Merville. On 13 April they were stopped by the First Australian Division, which had been transferred to the area. The British Fourth Division defended Hinges Ridge, the Fifth Division held Nieppe Forest and the 33rd Division was also involved.

=== Battle of Bailleul (13–15 April) ===
From 13–15 April, the Germans drove forward in the centre, taking Bailleul, 12 kilometres (7.5 mi) west of Armentières, despite increasing British resistance. Plumer assessed the heavy losses of the Second Army and the defeat of his southern flank and ordered his northern flank to withdraw from Passchendaele to Ypres and the Yser Canal; the Belgian Army to the north conformed.

=== Retirement from Passchendaele Ridge ===
On 23 March, Haig had ordered Plumer to make contingency plans to shorten the line along the Ypres Salient and release troops for the other armies. On 11 April, Plumer authorised a withdrawal of the southern flank of the Second Army and ordered the VIII and II corps in the Passchendaele Salient to retreat the next day into the Battle Zone, behind outposts left in the Forward Zone of the British defensive system. The divisional commanders were ordered that the Forward Zone must be held and that the Germans must not be given the impression that a withdrawal was in progress. At noon on 12 April, the VIII Corps ordered the infantry retirement to begin that night and the 59th Division was withdrawn and transferred south, to be replaced by part of the 41st Division. The II Corps had begun to withdraw its artillery at the same time as VIII Corps on the night of 11/12 April and ordered the 36th and 30th divisions to conform to the VIII Corps withdrawal which were complete by 13 April, without German interference; VIII Corps HQ was transferred to reserve.

During 13 April, General Headquarters (GHQ) discussed the retirements in the Lys valley, which had lengthened the British front line and Plumer agreed to a retirement in the Ypres Salient to the Mt Kemmel, Voormezeele (2.5 mi (4.0 km) south of Ypres), White Château (1 mi (1.6 km) east of Ypres) to Pilckem Ridge defence line but ordered only that artillery ammunition be carried to the rear; the 4th Army reported on 14 April, that the British were still occupying the Passchendaele Salient. The next day was quiet in the salient and the withdrawal of the II Corps and XXII Corps divisions was covered by the outposts in the original front line and artillery, which was divided into some active batteries which fired and a greater number of batteries kept silent, camouflaged and not to fire except in an emergency. (Note: XXII and II corps divisions were the 30th, 36th, 41st, 6th and brigades of the 49th and 21st divisions.) Plumer gave orders to begin the retirement by occupying the line before the night of 15/16 April, while maintaining the garrisons in the outpost line and holding the Battle Zone with a few troops as an intermediate line. During the night of 15/16 April, the outpost line garrisons were to be withdrawn behind the new front line at 4:00 a.m. and the intermediate line in front of the Battle Zone was to be held as long as possible, to help the troops in the new line to get ready.

On 16 April, patrols went forward during the morning and found the area between the old and new front lines to be empty, the Germans still apparently in ignorance of the retirement; one patrol captured a German officer scouting for observation posts who did not know where the British were. Only in the late afternoon did German troops begin to close up to the new line and the British troops in the Battle Zone easily repulsed the German infantry, the 4th Army diary recorded that patrols discovered the withdrawal at 4:40 a.m. that afternoon.

=== Battle of Merckem (17 April) ===
On 17 April, the Belgian Army defeated an attack from Houthulst Forest (The Battle of Merckem) against the 10th and 3rd Belgian divisions from Langemarck to Lake Blankaart by the 58th, 2nd Naval and the 6th Bavarian divisions, with help from the II Corps artillery. The Germans captured Kippe but were forced out by counter-attacks and the line was restored by nightfall. On the afternoon of 27 April, the south end of the outpost line was driven in when Voormezeele was captured, re-captured and then partly captured by the Germans; another outpost line was set up north-east of the village. Belgian losses were 619 killed, wounded or missing. The Germans lost between 1922 and 2354 men, of which 779 were taken prisoner.

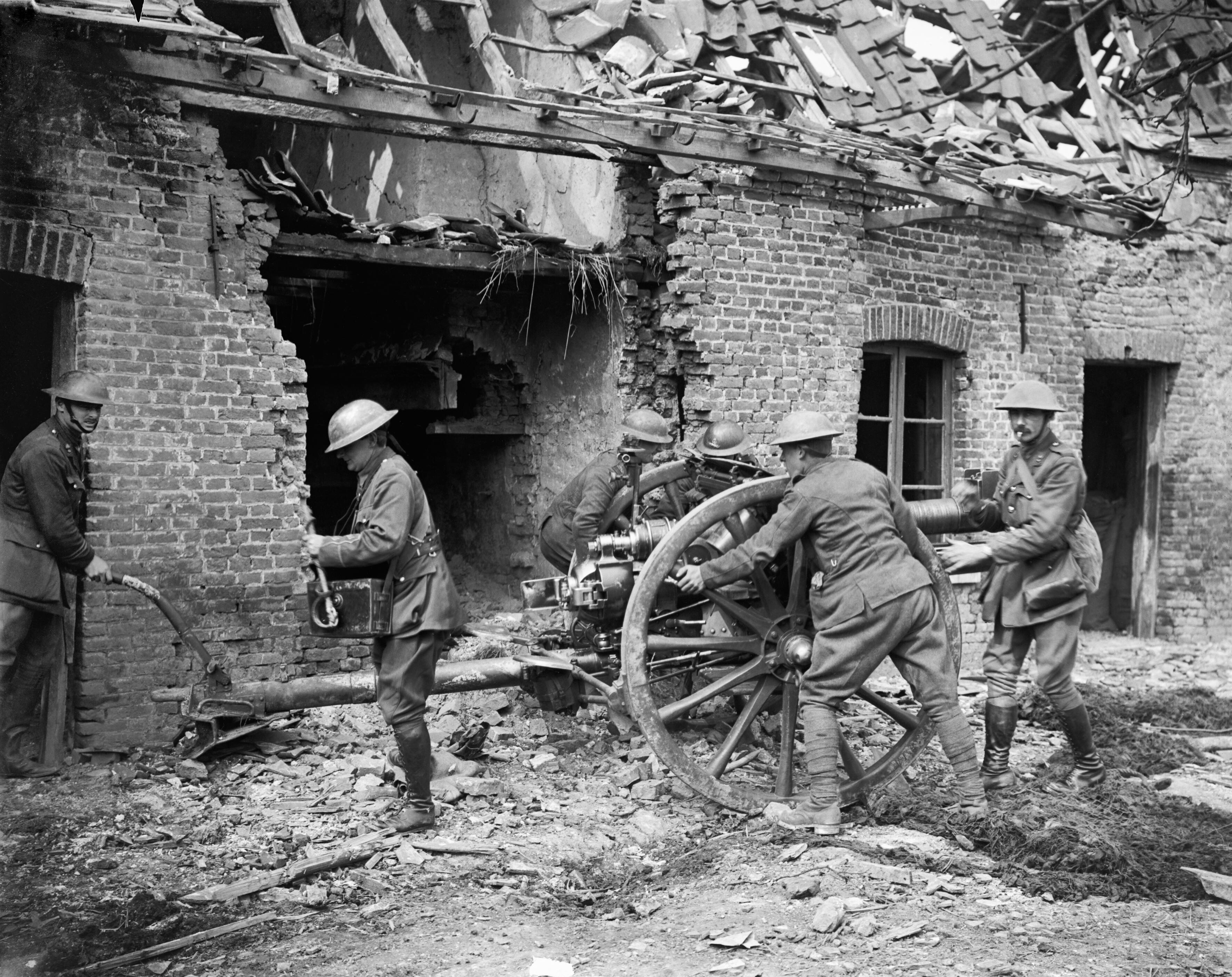
British gunners with 18-pounder at Saint Floris

=== First Battle of Kemmel (17–19 April) ===
The Kemmelberg is a height commanding the area between Armentières and Ypres. On 17–19 April, the German Fourth Army attacked and was repulsed by the British.

=== Battle of Béthune (18 April) ===
On 18 April, the German Sixth Army attacked south from the breakthrough area toward Béthune but was repulsed.

=== Second Battle of Kemmel (25–26 April) ===
French General Ferdinand Foch had recently assumed supreme command of the Allied forces and on 14 April agreed to send French reserves to the Lys sector. A French division relieved the British defenders of the Kemmelberg.

From 25–26 April, the German Fourth Army made a sudden attack on the Kemmelberg with three divisions and captured it. This success gained some ground, but there was no progress made toward a new break in the Allied line.

=== Battle of the Scherpenberg (29 April) ===
On 29 April, a final German attack captured the Scherpenberg, a hill to the north-west of the Kemmelberg.

== Aftermath ==
=== Analysis ===
During Georgette, the Germans managed to penetrate Allied lines to a depth of 9.3 mi (15 km). However, they failed in their main objective to capture Hazebrouck and force a British withdrawal from the Ypres salient. More French reinforcements arrived in the latter part of April, after the Germans had suffered many casualties, especially among the Stoßtruppen. By 29 April, the German high command realized they could no longer achieve their objectives and called off the offensive.

=== Casualties ===
In 1937, C. B. Davies, J. E. Edmonds and R. G. B. Maxwell-Hyslop, the British official historians gave casualties from 9–30 April as c. 82,000 British and a similar number of German casualties. Total casualties since 21 March were British: c. 240,000, French: 92,004 and German: 348,300.

In 1978, Middlebrook wrote of 160,000 British casualties, 22,000 killed, 75,000 prisoners and 63,000 wounded. Middlebrook estimated French casualties as 80,000 and German as c. 250,000 with 50–60,000 lightly wounded.

In 2002, Marix Evans recorded 109,300 German casualties and the loss of eight aircraft, British losses of 76,300 men, 106 guns and 60 aircraft and French losses of 35,000 men and 12 guns. In 2006 Zabecki gave 86,000 German, 82,040 British and 30,000 French casualties.

The German flying ace Manfred von Richthofen, the "Red Baron," was killed in action.
