= 2014 San Marino local elections =

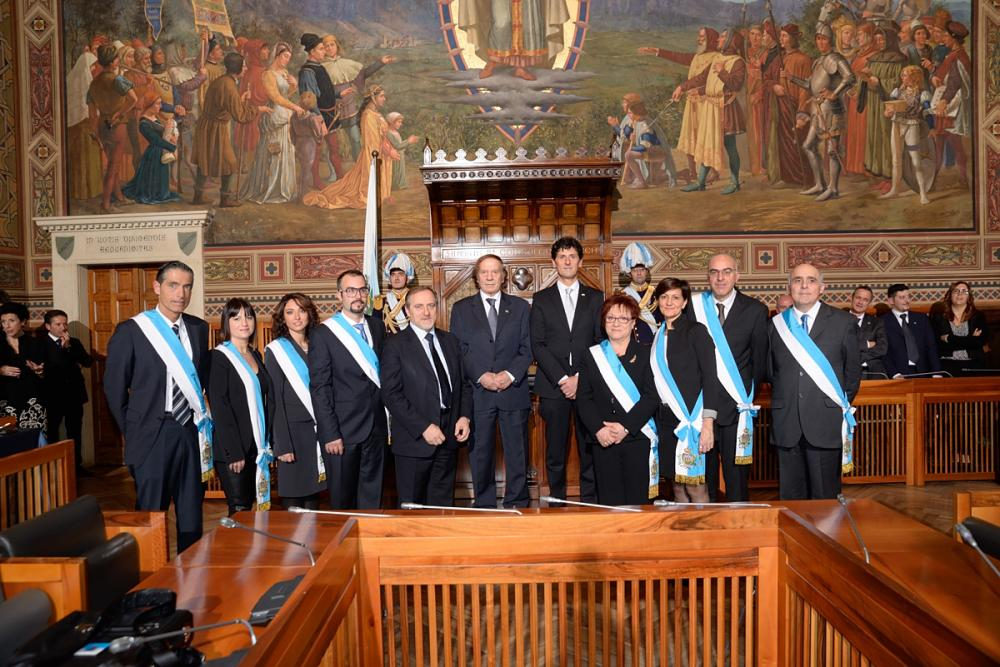
The Captains of the Castles of the nine Castles during the oath at the Palazzo Pubblico

The 2014 San Marino local elections were held on 30 November to elect the mayors and the councils of the 9 municipalities of San Marino. Overall turnout was 44.9%.

== Electoral system ==
Voters elected the mayor (Italian: capitano di castello) and the municipal council (giunta di castello). The number of seats was determined by law: the city councils of Chiesanuova, Faetano and Montegiardino were composed of eight members; the councils of Acquaviva, Borgo Maggiore, City of San Marino, Domagnano, Fiorentino and Serravalle were composed of 10 members.

Candidates ran on lists led by a mayoral candidate. Voters elected a list and were allowed to give up to two preferential votes. Seats were allocated with the d'Hondt method if the winner had obtained at least 60% of the votes. Otherwise, six seats would have been allocated to the winning party (five seats if the council had eight members) and the rest of the seats would have been allocated using the d'Hondt method to the rest of the parties. The winning list mayoral candidate was proclaimed mayor.

In the municipalities where only one list contested the election, the election was considered valid if the turnout was over 35%.

== Results ==
=== Acquaviva ===
List	Mayoral candidate	Votes	%	Seats
Together for Acquaviva	Lucia Tamagnini	544	100.00	10
Total		544	100.00	10
Valid votes		544	91.74	
Invalid/blank votes		49	8.26	
Total votes		593	100.00	
Registered voters/turnout		1,331	44.55	

=== Borgo Maggiore ===
List	Mayoral candidate	Votes	%	Seats
Borgo to the center	Federico Cavalli	1,863	100.00	10
Total		1,863	100.00	10
Valid votes		1,863	90.97	
Invalid/blank votes		185	9.03	
Total votes		2,048	100.00	
Registered voters/turnout		4,584	44.68	

=== Chiesanuova ===
List	Mayoral candidate	Votes	%	Seats
Chiesanuova Together – Citizens to the centre	Marino Rosti	285	60.38	5
Chiesanuova... Our town	Gino Giovagnoli	187	39.62	3
Total		472	100.00	8
Valid votes		472	95.55	
Invalid/blank votes		22	4.45	
Total votes		494	100.00	
Registered voters/turnout		748	66.04	

=== City of San Marino ===
List	Mayoral candidate	Votes	%	Seats
Continuity and Innovation	Maria Teresa Beccari	716	52.88	6
Viviamocittà	Settimio Bonelli	638	47.12	4
Total		1,354	100.00	10
Valid votes		1,354	93.44	
Invalid/blank votes		95	6.56	
Total votes		1,449	100.00	
Registered voters/turnout		2,988	48.49	

=== Domagnano ===
List	Mayoral candidate	Votes	%	Seats
Domagnano Alive Town	Gabriel Guidi	1,007	100.00	10
Total		1,007	100.00	10
Valid votes		1,007	90.15	
Invalid/blank votes		110	9.85	
Total votes		1,117	100.00	
Registered voters/turnout		2,302	48.52	

=== Faetano ===
List	Mayoral candidate	Votes	%	Seats
Faetano Alive	Fanny Gasperoni	331	71.18	6
Together for Faetano	Pier Marino Bedetti	134	28.82	2
Total		465	100.00	8
Valid votes		465	95.09	
Invalid/blank votes		24	4.91	
Total votes		489	100.00	
Registered voters/turnout		811	60.30	

=== Fiorentino ===
List	Mayoral candidate	Votes	%	Seats
Fiorentino Civic List	Daniela Giannoni	497	59.24	4
Fiorentino for Fiorentino	Niconetta Canini	342	40.76	6
Total		839	100.00	10
Valid votes		839	93.22	
Invalid/blank votes		61	6.78	
Total votes		900	100.00	
Registered voters/turnout		1,715	52.48	

=== Montegiardino ===
List	Mayoral candidate	Votes	%	Seats
For Montegiardino	Giacomo Rinaldi	324	100.00	8
Total		324	100.00	8
Valid votes		324	83.29	
Invalid/blank votes		65	16.71	
Total votes		389	100.00	
Registered voters/turnout		634	61.36	

=== Serravalle ===
List	Mayoral candidate	Votes	%	Seats
The Municipality I Would Like	Vittorio Brigliadori	1,352	64.20	7
Free voice	Dalibor Riccardi	754	35.80	3
Total		2,106	100.00	10
Valid votes		2,106	84.85	
Invalid/blank votes		376	15.15	
Total votes		2,482	100.00	
Registered voters/turnout		7,059	35.16	
