= 2009 San Marino local elections =

Election in San Marino

The 2009 San Marino local elections were held on 7 June to elect the mayors and the councils of the nine municipalities of San Marino. Overall turnout was 55.1%. The election in the City of San Marino was declared invalid, as it didn't reach the turnout quorum. Therefore, a second election was held on 29 November.

== Electoral system ==
Voters elected the mayor (Italian: capitano di castello) and the municipal council (giunta di castello). The number of seats was determined by law: the city councils of Chiesanuova, Faetano and Montegiardino were composed of eight members; the councils of Acquaviva, Borgo Maggiore, City of San Marino, Domagnano, Fiorentino and Serravalle were composed of 10 members.

Candidates ran on lists led by a mayoral candidate. Voters elected a list and were allowed to give up to two preferential votes. Seats were allocated with the d'Hondt method if the winner had obtained at least 60% of the votes. Otherwise, six seats would have been allocated to the winning party (five seats if the council had eight members) and the rest of the seats would have been allocated using the d'Hondt method to the rest of the parties. The winning list mayoral candidate was proclaimed mayor.

In the municipalities where only one list contested the election, the election was considered valid if the turnout was over 50% and the votes to the list were over 50% of the valid votes (votes to the list plus blank votes).

== June election results ==
Results of the election held on 7 June.

=== Acquaviva ===
List	Mayoral candidate	Votes	%	Seats
List A	Loretta Mazza	415	50.92	5
List B	Claudio Morganti	400	49.08	3
Total		815	100.00	8
Valid votes		815	94.66	
Invalid/blank votes		46	5.34	
Total votes		861	100.00	
Registered voters/turnout		1,269	67.85	

=== Borgo Maggiore ===
List	Mayoral candidate	Votes	%	Seats
List C	Sergio Nanni	910	38.62	6
List B	Federico Cavalli	886	37.61	3
List A	Nazzareno Marani	560	23.77	1
Total		2,356	100.00	10
Valid votes		2,356	93.94	
Invalid/blank votes		152	6.06	
Total votes		2,508	100.00	
Registered voters/turnout		4,456	56.28	

=== Chiesanuova ===
List	Mayoral candidate	Votes	%	Seats
List B	Franco Santi	304	59.38	5
List A	Luigino Fantini	208	40.62	3
Total		512	100.00	8
Valid votes		512	96.24	
Invalid/blank votes		20	3.76	
Total votes		532	100.00	
Registered voters/turnout		716	74.30	

=== City of San Marino ===
The elections were declared invalid as the quorum of 50% turnout was not reached. As a result, the election was repeated on 29 November.

List	Mayoral candidate	Votes	%	Seats
List A	Alessandro Barulli	1,442	100.00	10
Total		1,442	100.00	10
Valid votes		1,442	92.91	
Invalid/blank votes		110	7.09	
Total votes		1,552	100.00	
Registered voters/turnout		3,215	48.27	

=== Domagnano ===
List	Mayoral candidate	Votes	%	Seats
List A	Daniele Gasperoni	756	62.90	6
List B	Alessandro de Biagi	446	37.10	4
Total		1,202	100.00	10
Valid votes		1,202	93.54	
Invalid/blank votes		83	6.46	
Total votes		1,285	100.00	
Registered voters/turnout		2,078	61.84	

=== Faetano ===
List	Mayoral candidate	Votes	%	Seats
List A	Pier Marino Bedetti	372	100.00	8
Total		372	100.00	8
Valid votes		372	88.15	
Invalid/blank votes		50	11.85	
Total votes		422	100.00	
Registered voters/turnout		786	53.69	

=== Fiorentino ===
List	Mayoral candidate	Votes	%	Seats
List B	Gerri Fabbri	556	60.24	6
List A	Davide Santi	367	39.76	4
Total		923	100.00	10
Valid votes		923	92.12	
Invalid/blank votes		79	7.88	
Total votes		1,002	100.00	
Registered voters/turnout		1,616	62.00	

=== Montegiardino ===
List	Mayoral candidate	Votes	%	Seats
List A	Marta Fabbri	408	100.00	8
Total		408	100.00	8
Valid votes		408	91.69	
Invalid/blank votes		37	8.31	
Total votes		445	100.00	
Registered voters/turnout		620	71.77	

=== Serravalle ===
List	Mayoral candidate	Votes	%	Seats
List A	Leandro Maiani	1,549	51.11	6
List C	Stefano Palmucci	1,274	42.03	4
List B	Marino Gai	208	6.86	0
Total		3,031	100.00	10
Valid votes		3,031	92.27	
Invalid/blank votes		254	7.73	
Total votes		3,285	100.00	
Registered voters/turnout		6,796	48.34	

== November election results ==
On the June election, the election in the City of San Marino was declared invalid as it didn't reach the turnout quorum. The election was repeated on 29 November.

=== City of San Marino ===
List	Mayoral candidate	Votes	%	Seats
List A	Maria Teresa Beccari	938	58.59	6
List B	Fabrizio Perotto	663	41.41	4
Total		1,601	100.00	10
Valid votes		1,601	94.01	
Invalid/blank votes		102	5.99	
Total votes		1,703	100.00	
Registered voters/turnout		3,215	52.97	
