= Fernando Tamagnini de Abreu e Silva =

Portuguese military officer (1856–1924)

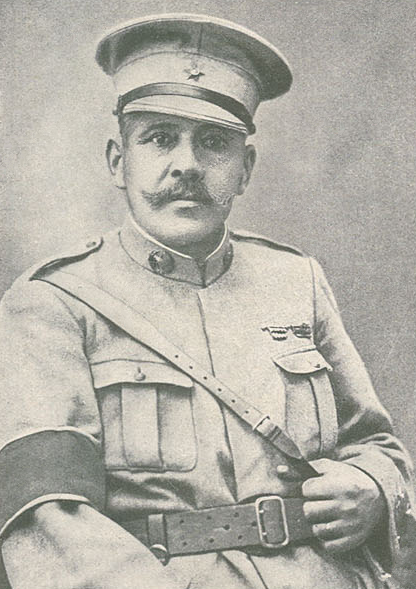
- Born: 13 May 1856; Tomar, Kingdom of Portugal
- Died: 24 November 1924 (aged 68) Lisbon, Portugal
- Allegiance: Portugal
- Branch: Portuguese Army
- Service years: 1873–1918
- Rank: General
- Conflicts: World War I; Western Front; Battle of the Lys
- Awards: Military Order of Aviz; Military Order of Christ; Military Order of the Tower and Sword

Fernando Tamagnini de Abreu e Silva (13 May 1856 – 24 November 1924) was a cavalry officer and general of the Portuguese Army.

== Early life ==
He was born on 13 May 1856 in Tomar, Portugal.

== Military career ==
On June 2, 1873, he enlisted as a volunteer in the 2nd Cavalry Regiment. In 1891, he assumed the position of director of the Regimental School and, two years later, joined the Lisbon Municipal Guard. In 1913, he attended the Refresher School, and the following year, he joined the Armed Forces General Staff as the Inspector of the Divisional Cavalry. In 1915, he was appointed interim commander of the Cavalry Brigade.

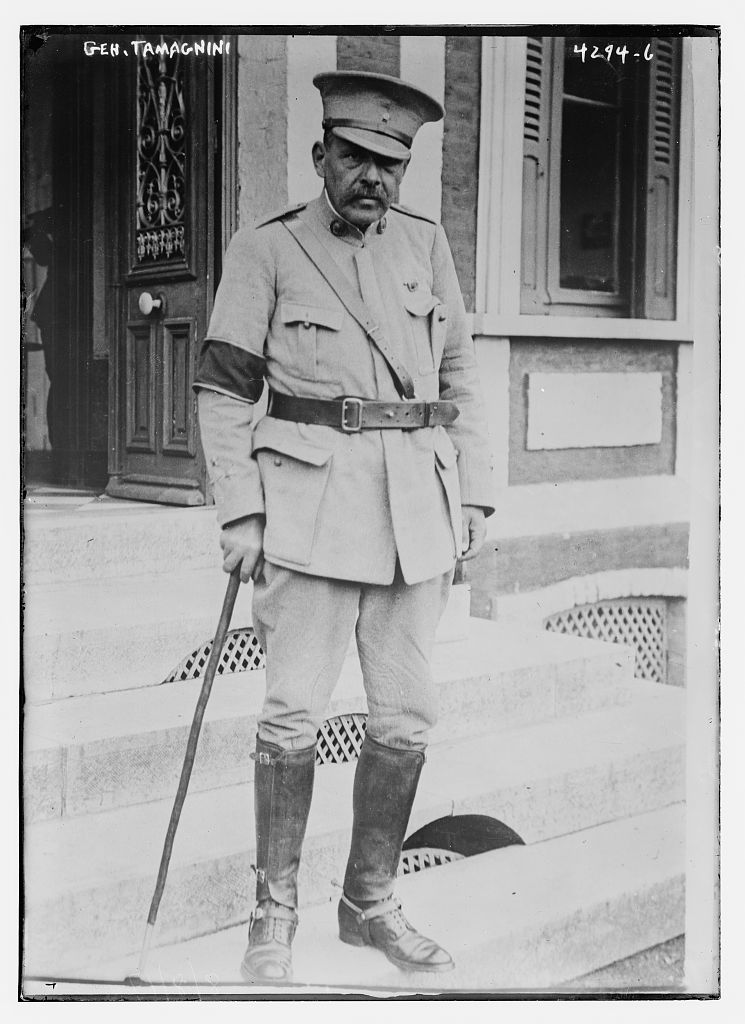
Silva in 1917

After his promotion to general, he was chosen to command the Training Division mobilized in Tancos and later the CEP (Portuguese Expeditionary Corps), which fought in Flanders during World War I and was integrated into the British Army. He commanded this corps from January 1917 to August 25, 1918. After the CEP's disaster at the Battle of the Lys on April 9, 1918, he was replaced on August 25 as commander of that same Corps by General Tomás António Garcia Rosado.

He also served as commander of the 5th Army Division and as President of the Supreme Military Court.

On 15 February 1919, he was made Grand Officer of the Military Order of Aviz, on 28 June 1919 he was awarded the Grand Cross of the Military Order of Christ, on 14 September 1920 the Grand Cross of the Military Order of the Tower and Sword, of Valor, Loyalty and Merit and on 31 December 1920 he was elevated to Grand Cross of the Military Order of Avis.

== Death ==
He died on 24 November 1924 in Lisbon, Portugal.
