= 1st Division (Portugal) =

1ª Divisão do CEP 1st CEP Division
- Active: 1917–1919
- Country: Portugal
- Allegiance: Portuguese Army
- Branch: Army
- Type: Division
- Role: Infantry
- Size: 25 000
- Headquarters: Lestren, France
- Engagements: World War I

Commanders
- Division commander: General Gomes da Costa

The 1st Division was one of the two divisions of the Portuguese Expeditionary Corps (CEP, Corpo Expedicionário Português), the main military force of Portugal that fought in the World War I Western Front on the side of the Allies. The Division was under the command of General Gomes da Costa, during most of its existence.

== World War I ==
From 2 June 1917 to 6 April 1918 the 1st Division was responsible for the subsectors of Neuve-Chappelle and Ferme du Bois of the Portuguese Sector of the Western Front.

After heavy losses in the Front, the 1st Division was removed from the front line, three days before the 9 April 1918 German offensive that gave origin of the Battle of the Lys, where CEP was virtually destroyed.

In July 1918, the 1st Division was the core for the reconstruction of the CEP and participated in the final Allied offensive.

The 4th Company of IV Battalion the 1st Division, under the command of captain Barros Bastos made a final assault against the German positions near the Scheldt river on 11 November 1918, the same day of the Armistice. This was the last Portuguese combat action of World War I.
