= Portuguese Expeditionary Corps =

Portuguese military force which fought in the Western Front of World War I

Corpo Expedicionário Português Portuguese Expeditionary Corps
- CEP's recognition flash
- Active: During World War I, 1917–1918
- Country: Portugal
- Allegiance: Portuguese Army
- Type: Expeditionary force
- Role: Expeditionary warfare
- Size: Corps (~ 55,000)
- Headquarters: Saint-Venant, France
- Engagements: World War I: Western Front; Battle of the Lys; Hundred Days Offensive

Commanders
- Corps commander (until July 1918): General Tamagnini de Abreu
- Corps commander (from July 1918): General Garcia Rosado
- Divisional commander: General Gomes da Costa
- Divisional commander: General Simas Machado
- Chief of the General Staff (until March 1918): Major Roberto da Cunha Baptista
- Chief of the General Staff (from March 1918): Colonel Sinel de Cordes

The Portuguese Expeditionary Corps (CEP, Portuguese: Corpo Expedicionário Português) was the main expeditionary force from Portugal that fought in the Western Front, during World War I. Portuguese neutrality ended in 1916 after the Portuguese seizure of German merchant ships resulted in the German Empire declaring war on Portugal. The expeditionary force was raised soon after and included around 55,000 soldiers.

== Background ==
At the outbreak of the First World War, Portugal had declared its neutrality. The country remained neutral until 1916, though occasional skirmishes between Portuguese and German colonial troops occurred in Africa. In March 1916, the Portuguese Government seized a number of merchant ships belonging to the Central Powers which were anchored in Lisbon. The German government took this as a hostile act and declared war.

The Government announced it would raise an expeditionary force to fight on the Western Front, with the first units being raised by July. In early 1917, the force was split into two elements:

1. Portuguese Expeditionary Corps (Corpo Expedicionário Português or CEP) – a combined infantry force of about 55,000 men, to operate under the control of the British First Army;
2. Independent Heavy Artillery Corps (Corpo de Artilharia Pesada Independente or CAPI) – an artillery force of nine batteries of heavy railway guns, manned by Portuguese gunners with artillery provided by France and the United Kingdom, to operate under the control of the French Army.

Initially, CEP was constituted as a single reinforced infantry division, organized according to the Portuguese model, in which divisions were much larger than the British ones. Subsequently, it was decided to reorganize the CEP according to the British model, allowing it to become an army corps of two divisions and corps support troops, just by adding some additional battalions. This new organization would allow it to have sufficient autonomy to be able to take the responsibility for an entire independent sector of the Western Front.

== Deployment of the CEP ==
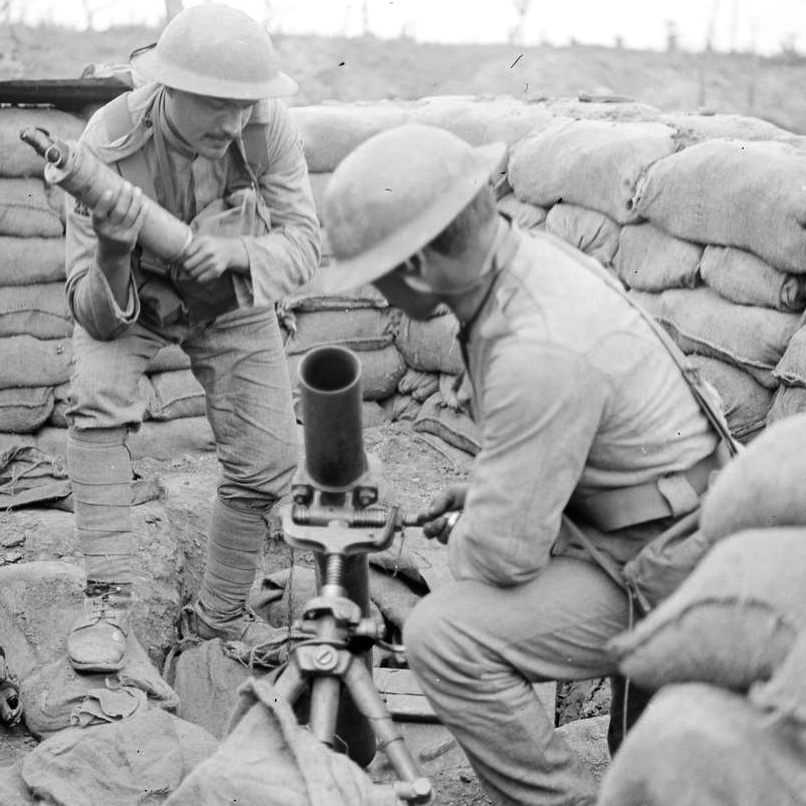
CEP soldiers loading a Stokes Mortar.

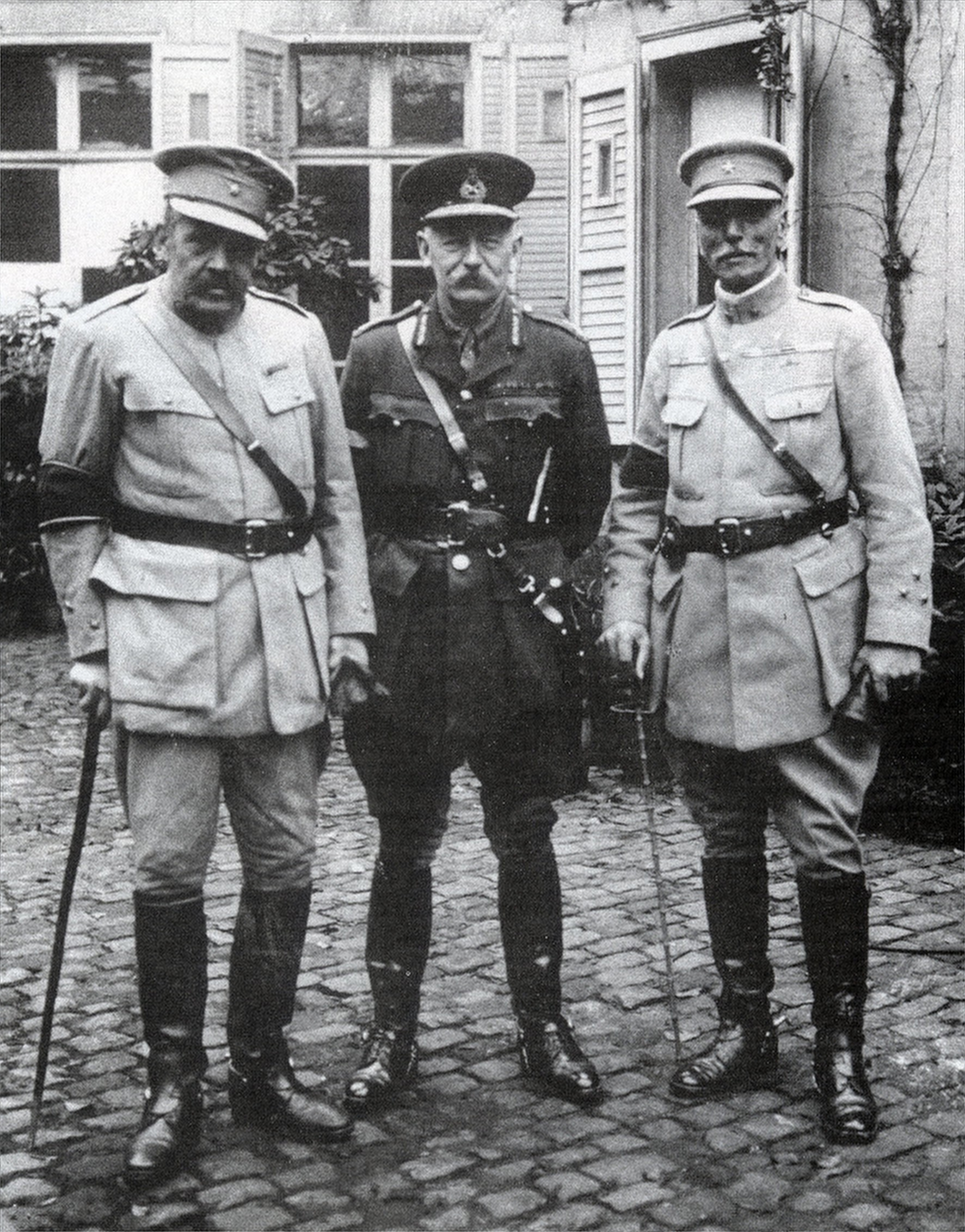
Generals Tamagnini and Gomes da Costa, together with General Haking.

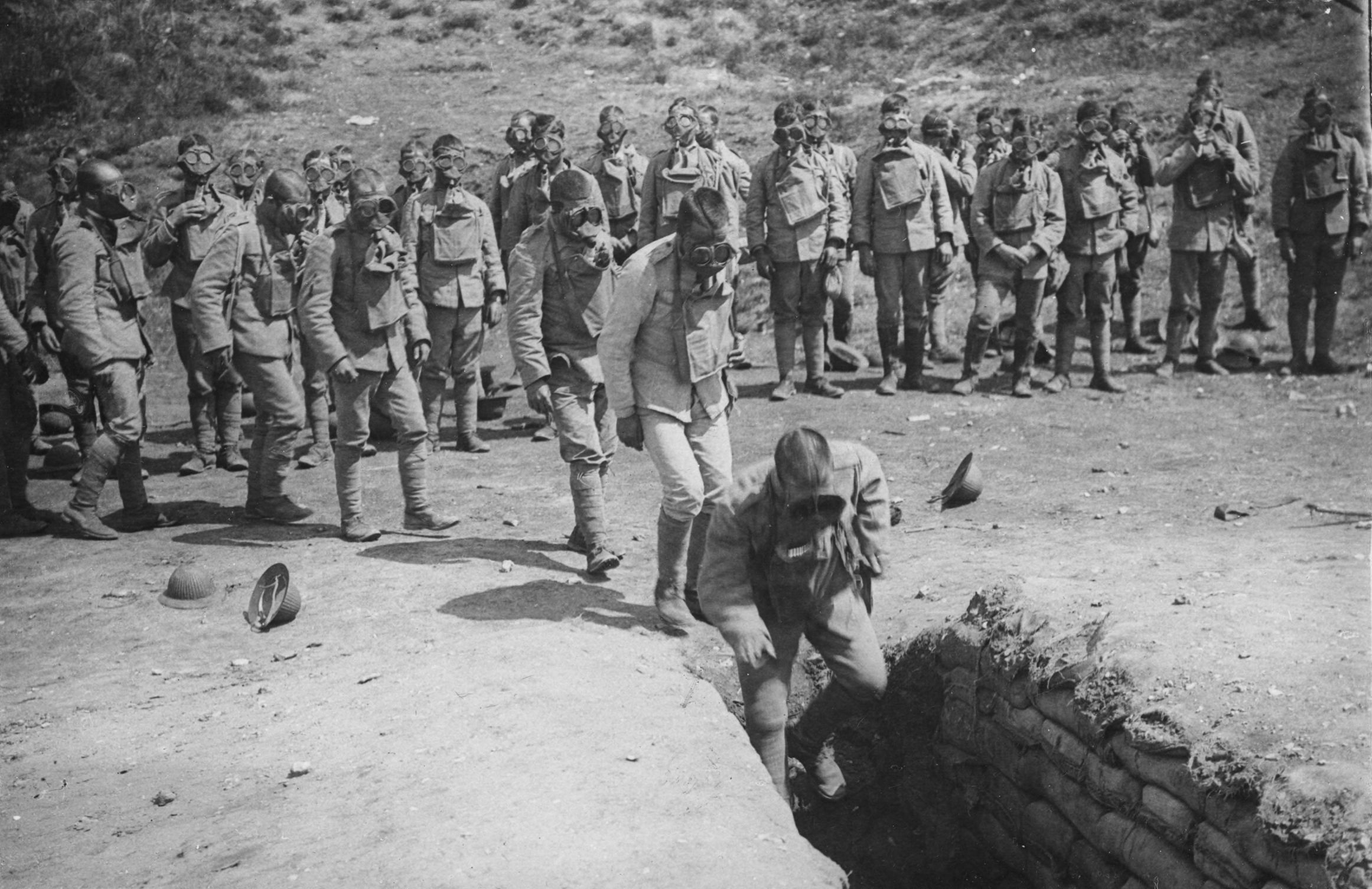
CEP troops in gas warfare training.

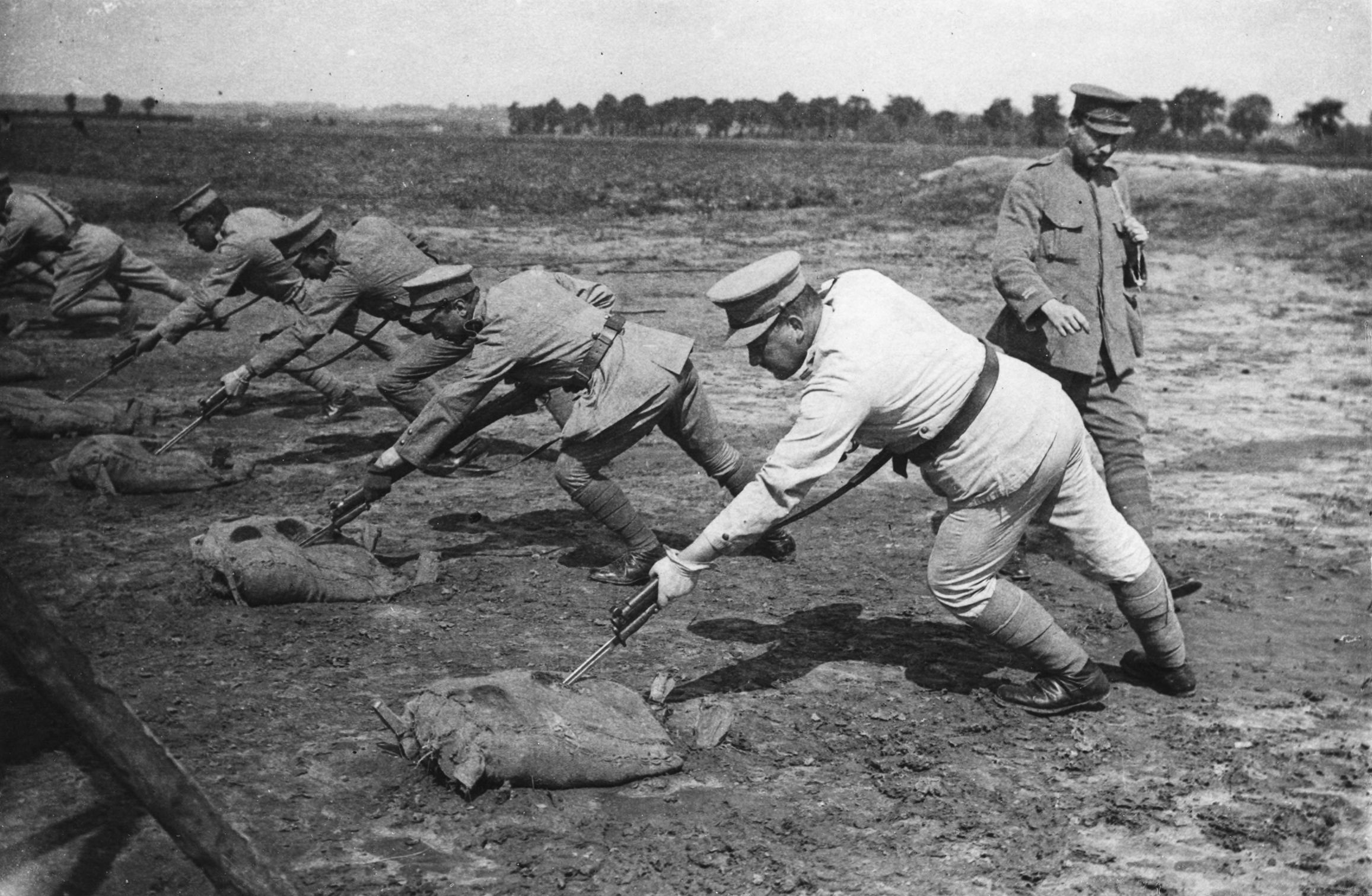
CEP troops in bayonet training.

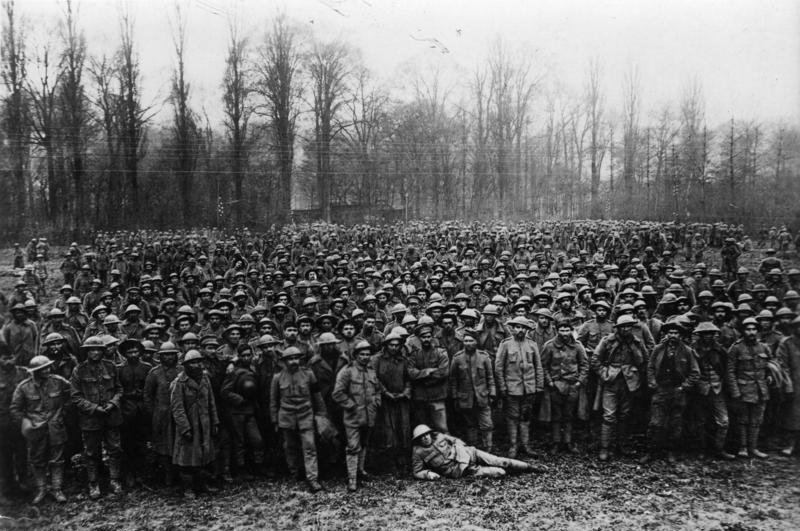
CEP prisoners of war after the Battle of the Lys.

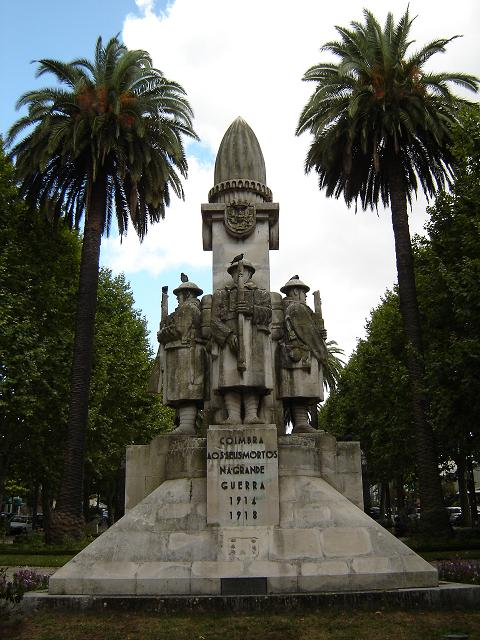
A monument to the dead of the First World War in Coimbra.

The CEP was shipped to France in early 1917, where the first groups received training in trench warfare and were equipped with British small arms. The first units began to deploy in May, and a sector of the frontline was fully held by the CEP by November; by the end of October, just under 60,000 troops had been sent to France.

From 6 November 1917, CEP took charge of the whole "Portuguese Sector" of the Western Front, with a total frontage of 18 kilometres (11 mi). In accordance with Allied practice, the sector included three lines of defense. The first included the front line (A-Line), the support line (B-Line) and the reserve line (C-Line). The second included the village line (brigade headquarters line) and the corps line. Finally, the army line formed the third line of defense.

The Portuguese Sector was divided into four brigade sectors. Each brigade deployed two battalions at the front (each defending a sub-sector of the brigade sector), one in support and another in reserve. Each of the CEP's two divisions controlled two brigade sectors, with a third brigade in reserve.

== Combat service until the Lys ==
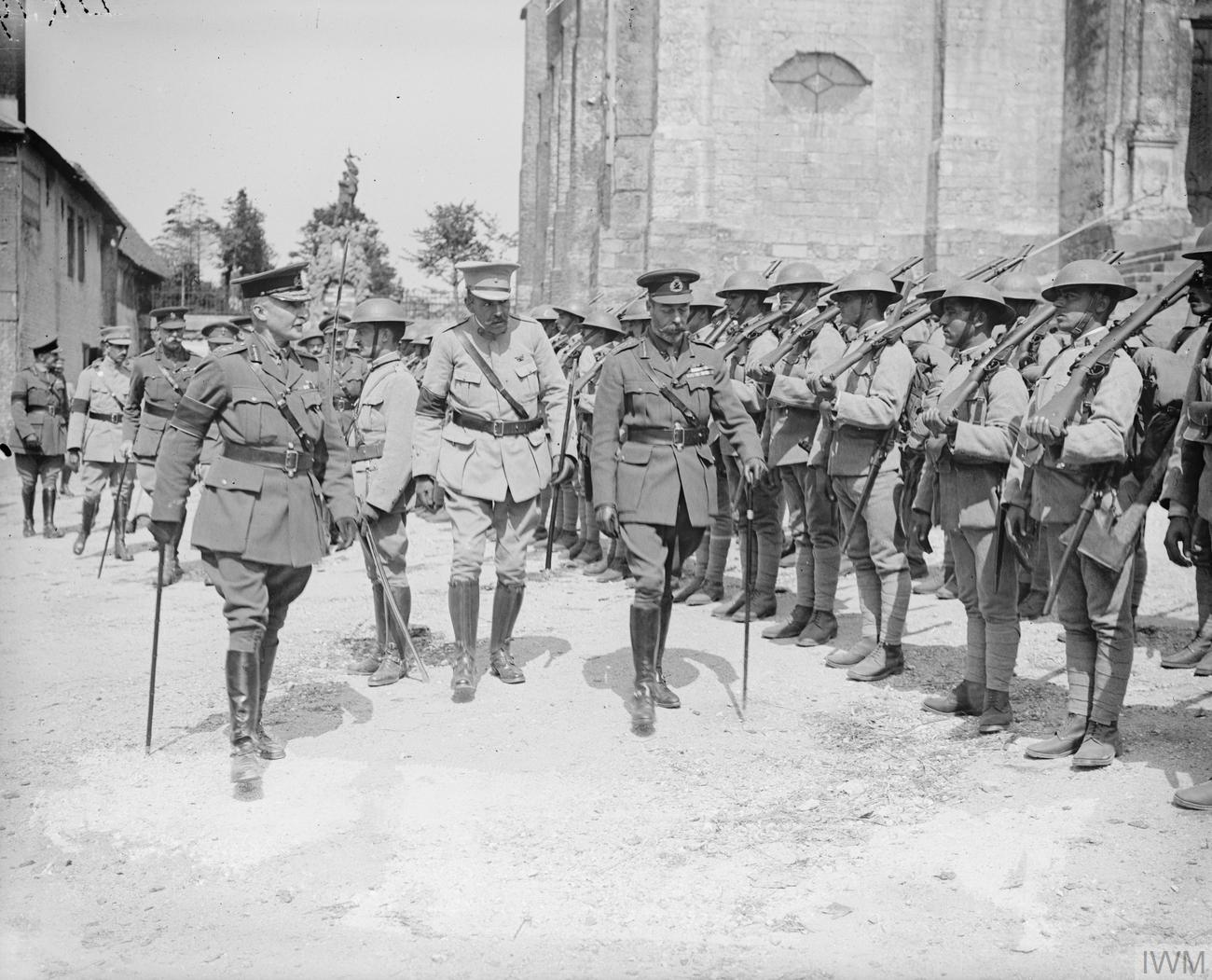
King George V, General Fernando Tamagnini, C-in-C of the CEP, and General Sir Henry Horne, commander of the British First Army, inspecting Portuguese troops at Fauquembergues, 12 July 1917.

CEP suffered the first German attack on 4 June 1917, made against Neuve-Chapelle sector. The attack was repelled by the 35th Portuguese Infantry Battalion, which had deployed to the front trenches just two days before. On the night of 12 June, a more intense German attack was carried out against Ferme du Bois and Neuve-Chapelle sectors, being repelled by the 2nd, 3rd and 7th infantry battalions.

On 14 August, the Germans launched a strong attack against the Portuguese lines. After an intense artillery bombardment, a Stosstruppen battalion assaulted the Neuve-Chapelle and Fauquissart sectors. In the defence against this attack, 2nd Lieutenant Hernâni Cidade of the 35th Infantry Battalion stood out, being able to capture several German prisoners, including the captain who led the assault. In another German assault on 14 September, 2nd Lieutenant Gomes Teixeira, of the 7th Infantry Battalion, led a counterattack with his platoon, killing the German commander and other men and capturing four prisoners. Another 2nd Lieutenant, David Neto from the 4th Infantry Battalion, only supported by his orderly, captured an entire German patrol made up of one officer and seven men on 13 December. For the actions of these officers, the A-Line (Front Line) became known by the Portuguese troops as the "Line of the 2nd Lieutenants".

These actions also made CEP one of the first units of the British First Army to comply with General Horne's request for the need to capture German prisoners for obtaining intelligence. This resulted in a commendation to the CEP from the First Army high command.

The First Army command recognized that the front of the Portuguese Sector was too long to be defended by only four brigades and reduced it to 12 km on 22 December 1917. From then on and until 6 April 1918, it was constituted, from left to right, by the brigade sectors of Fauquissart, Chapigny, Neuve-Chapelle and Ferme du Bois.

Morale was low throughout the winter of 1917–1918, partly due to bad weather and partly due to a perception among the soldiers that there was no reason for them to be in France. In December 1917, the Portuguese government was brought down; Sidónio Pais was declared to be the new president. The new government called the Portuguese support for the Allies into question and made it easier getting furlough. Many officers used this opportunity. Another factor was that the UK diverted its whole sea transport capacity for use by American forces after April 1917 when the United States declared war to Germany.

Another major problem was a gradual loss of manpower; by April 1918, 10% of the CEP's strength had become casualties, due to the constant attrition of front-line service, and almost half of the officers were no longer present at the front. Replacements were not forthcoming, and so units became severely understrength: in order to cope, men were routinely denied leave, and units kept in the frontline for up to six months at a time, further lowering morale.

From January 1918, the German activity intensified. On 2 March, a strong German attack was made against Chapigny and Neuve-Chapelle sectors, with a heavy artillery, gas, mortars and machine-gun fire preparation. At 5am, the Germans assaulted and took the Front Line, forcing the 4th Infantry Battalion to retreat to the Support Line. The Portuguese artillery reacted, launching about 1400 grenades against the Front Line. A counterattack made by the 4th Battalion, supported by 12th and 17th battalions, terminated the German attack. In this action, the Portuguese incurred 146 casualties and the Germans over 200.

Despite the difficulties, CEP not only withstood the violent activity of the Germans, but even took the initiative. On 9 March, under Captain Ribeiro de Carvalho, the 1st Company of the 21st Infantry Battalion, supported by a detachment of 25 sappers, launched a strong assault against the German lines in the Ferme du Bois sector area. In this assault, the Portuguese forces were able to kill and capture a great number of German soldiers and to demolish several enemy fortified positions, suffering themselves 20 casualties. On 18 March, a company made up of 100 volunteers from the 14th Infantry Battalion, under the command of Captain Vale d'Andrade, assaulted the German positions on the Neuve-Chapelle sector, capturing three prisoners.

CEP continued to have a pro-active attitude until the pull back of its 1st Division. Just three days before that happened, on the dawn of 3 April, a company of the 2nd Infantry Battalion, under Captain Américo Olavo, assaulted the positions of the German 81st Reserve Division in Chapigny sector, occupying its 1st and 2nd lines and demolishing them, before withdrawing under enemy artillery fire.

In April 1918, some cases of indiscipline began to be reported from amongst the men. These culminated in the mutiny of the exhausted 7th Infantry Battalion on 4 April, the men from the unit refusing to return to the frontline, from where they had left just a few days before. The decision was then taken to pull the CEP out of the frontline and replace it with British units. On 6 April, the 1st Division was pulled back, with the British 55th (West Lancashire) Division extending its lines southwards to fill part of the gap and the 2nd Division taking up the remaining section of the line, now under the operational control of the XI British Corps. The 2nd Division itself, now holding twice the normal divisional frontage, was scheduled to withdraw on 9 April and to be replaced by two British divisions. That morning, however, the Germans opposite launched a major attack, which would develop into the Battle of the Lys.

== The CEP in the Battle of the Lys ==
The morning of 9 April found the CEP's 2nd Division with its 4th Brigade (Minho Brigade) in the frontline at the North, its 6th Brigade at the Centre and its 5th Brigade at the South. In a rear position, the 3rd Brigade (left as a reinforcement by the 1st Division) was in reserve.

At about the 4am, the Germans started the Battle of the Lys with a violent bombardment, that lasted about two hours, made by 1700 artillery guns concentrated in front of the Portuguese sector. Despite the tremendous disadvantage, the Portuguese artillery immediately responded to the fire with their 80 guns.

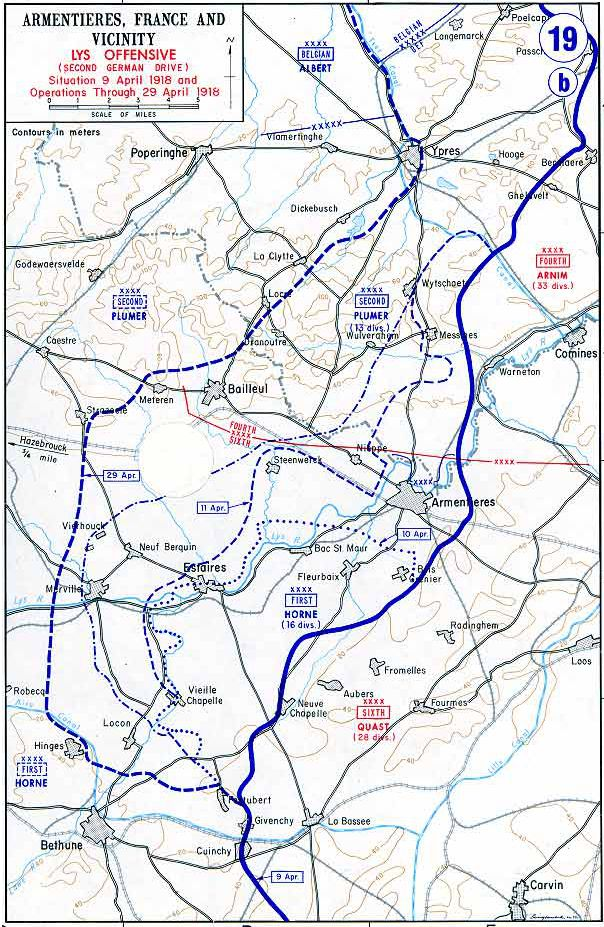
Map of German Lys offensive, 1918.

At 7am, eight German divisions (35th Infantry, 42nd Infantry, 1st Bavarian Reserve and 8th Bavarian Reserve in the first wave and 8th Infantry, 117th Infantry, 81st Reserve and 10th Ersatz in the second wave) attacked the Portuguese line, with a manpower of around 100,000 men against the 20,000 Portuguese defenders.

The 4th Portuguese Brigade (defending the northern sector, with the 8th and 20th infantry battalions in the front line, the 29th in support and the 3rd in reserve) was attacked by the 42nd German Division. The 8th Battalion, reinforced by the 29th, valiantly resisted in the first line to the assault. By 8am, the left flank of the Portuguese forces started to be enveloped by the Germans, who penetrated the gaps opened by the collapse and fall back of the 40th British Division's 119th Brigade. Under the German pressure, the Portuguese retreated to Laventie (4th Brigade's HQ), where they made their last stand, being overrun by 11am.

The 35th German Division assaulted the central sector, defended by the 6th Portuguese Brigade, quickly overrunning its battalions in the front line (1st and 2nd battalions).

The southern sector was assaulted by the 1st and 8th Bavarian Reserve divisions. The 8th Bavarian Reserve overran the 17th Battalion of the Portuguese 5th Brigade in the front line and the 11th Battalion of the 6th Brigade, which was in support. The 5th Brigade's 10th Battalion in the front line and the 4th in support were able to hold and slow the progression of the 1st Bavarian Reserve Division. Finally, the 1st Bavarian Reserve was able to reach the 5th Brigade's HQ in Canse du Raux, overrunning it at 1pm, with the brigade commander, Colonel Manuel Martins, being killed in the combat.

By 10:30am the Portuguese artillery batteries, which never stopped firing, even after the infantry positions defending them had been annihilated, started to be overrun by the German forces. Most of them were able to resist and continued to fire until 11am.

The bulk of 2nd Division ceased to exist as a fighting formation, retreating in such disarray that the divisional HQ had to relocate twice on 9 April.

The mounted reserve held by XI British Corps was released to support the 3rd Portuguese Brigade in containing the German advance. The 1st King Edward's Horse and the 11th Cyclist Battalion were sent and joined the 13th (5th Brigade) and 15th (3rd Brigade) Portuguese battalions on the south end of the line, which held their ground until the next morning and prevented any further advances to the south or south-west. Here occurred the famous episode of the 15th Portuguese Battalion's soldier Aníbal Milhais (nickname "Soldier Millions") who, armed only with a Lewis gun, single-handedly defeated two German assaults by laying down intense fire, covering his Portuguese and British comrades, despite coming under heavy attack himself. The last group of these units, under the command of Captain Bento Roma of the 13th Battalion, was able to resist the Germans in La Couture until 11:45am on 10 April.

The main gap in the line was filled by the deployment of the British 50th (Northumbrian) Division and 51st (Highland) Division.

It was later calculated that the CEP lost 400 dead, with around 6,500 taken prisoner, on 9 April, a third of its forces in the front line.

== The verdict after the Lys ==
The – overwhelmingly negative – historical verdict on the battle was epitomized by the comment that the Portuguese "ruined Ludendorff and saved their allies by running away"; whilst the German advance was superficially impressive, especially to begin with, it quickly lost momentum and stalled. However, it is likely that the collapse would have happened to any unit, not merely the weakened and demoralized Portuguese, as British troops in a similar position the previous month, in Operation Michael, had been overrun just as quickly.

== Subsequent actions of the CEP ==
The remnants of the CEP were withdrawn for rear-area pioneer and security duties, though the 1st Division would later be returned to the front line for a short period. On 16 June 1918, the 1st Division, supplemented by British units, replaced the 14th British Division in the defence of the Liliers-Steenbekque line.

In September 1918, already under the command of General Garcia Rosado, the remnants of the CEP started to be re-organised in order to re-enter combat. The objective was to form three brigades, composed of nine infantry battalions, that were to be organised with the remnants of the former CEP's original infantry units. By the end of October, four battalions were already combat-capable. These four infantry battalions (I, IV, VIII and IX battalions), together with several artillery, engineer, heavy machine gun and other remaining CEP units, participated in the Hundred Days Offensive.

The last Portuguese combat action in World War I happened on the day of the Armistice. On 11 November 1918, under the command of Captain Barros Bastos, the 4th Company of the IV Infantry Battalion (former 23rd Battalion of the 1st Division) made the last assault against the Germans on the passage of the Scheldt river, Belgium.

By the Armistice in 1918, the CEP had lost 2,160 dead, 5,224 wounded and 6,678 taken prisoner – 14,000 casualties and losses out of an establishment of 60,000.

== Composition ==
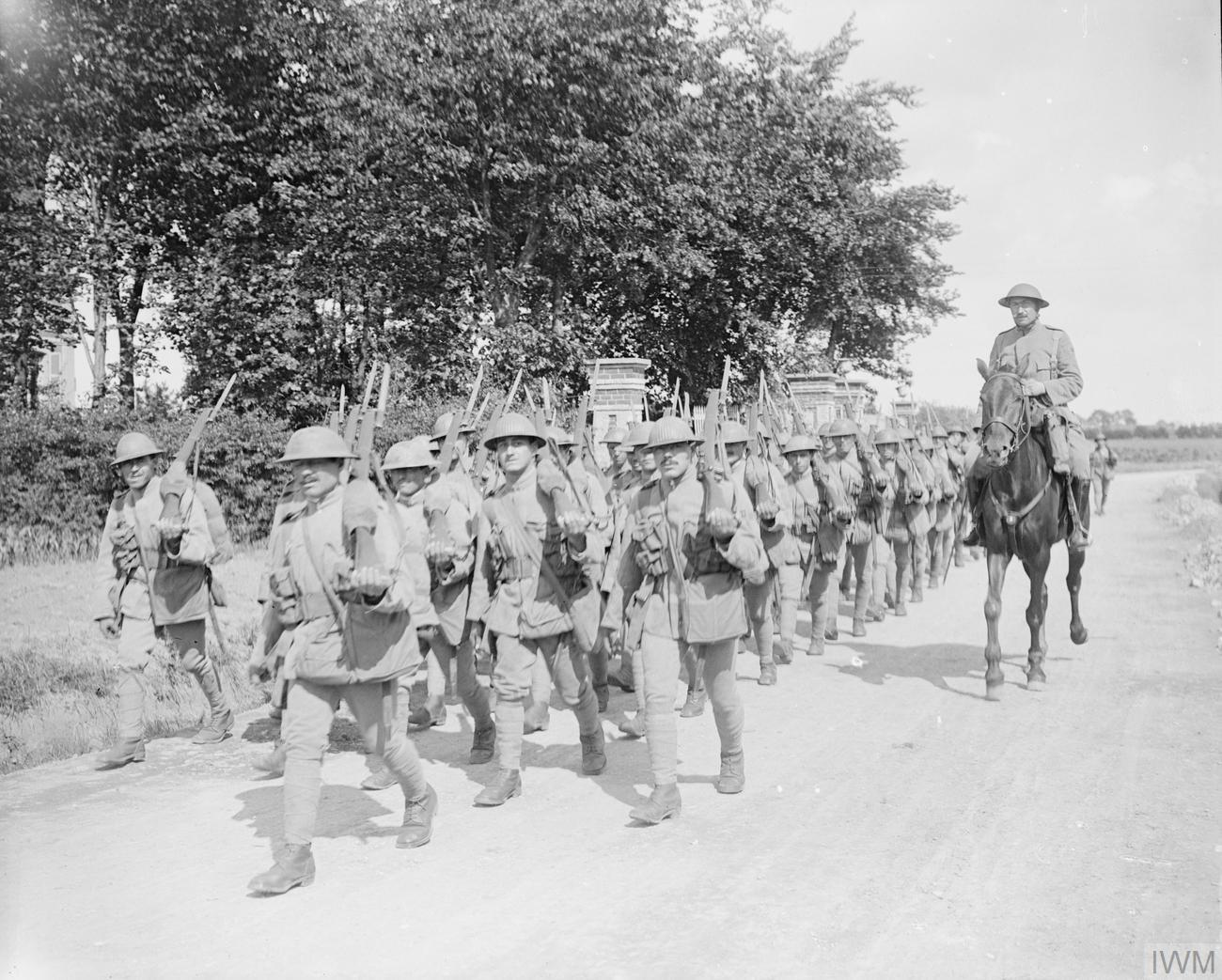
Portuguese infantry unit on the march. Near Locon, 24 June 1917

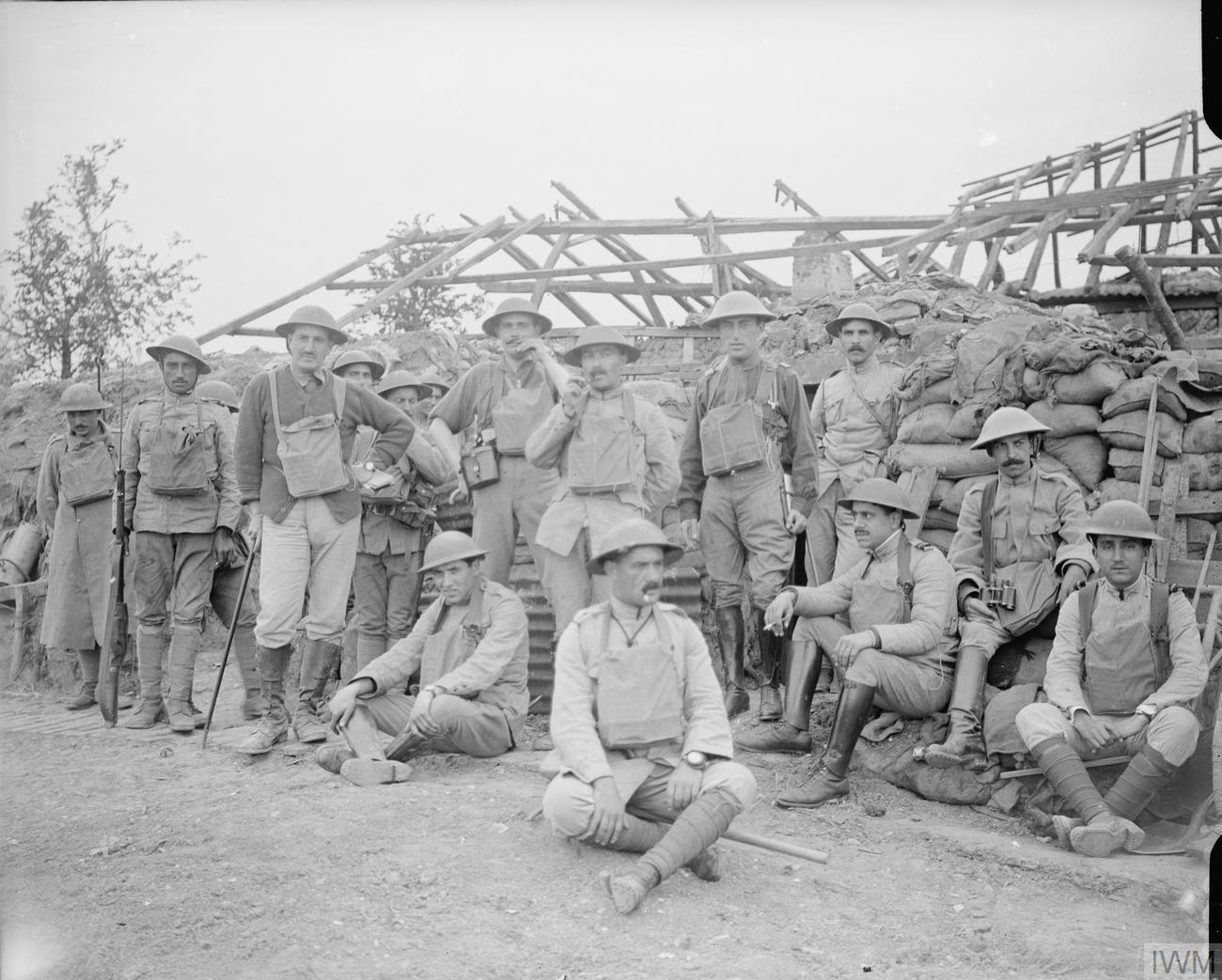
Portuguese Army officers near their dug-outs in the trenches. Near Neuve Chapelle, 25 June 1917

- 1st Division
  - 1st Brigade (21st, 22nd, 28th and 34th infantry battalions and a 75 mm light mortar battery)
  - 2nd Brigade (7th, 23rd, 24th and 25th infantry battalions and a 75 mm light mortar battery)
  - 3rd Brigade (9th, 12th, 14th and 15th infantry battalions and a 75 mm light mortar battery)
  - Division troops
    - 3 x Heavy Machine-guns battalions
    - 3 x Artillery battalions
    - 3 x 152 mm mortar batteries
    - 236 mm mortar battery
    - 3 x Miners and Sappers companies
    - Telegraph Company
    - Motor battalion
- 2nd Division
  - 4th (Minho) Brigade (3rd, 8th, 20th and 29th infantry battalions and a 75 mm light mortar battery)
  - 5th Brigade (4th, 10th, 13th and 17th infantry battalions and a 75 mm light mortar battery)
  - 6th Brigade (1st, 2nd, 5th and 11th infantry battalions and a 75 mm light mortar battery)
  - Division troops
    - 3 x Heavy Machine-guns battalions
    - 3 x Artillery battalions
    - 3 x 152 mm mortar batteries
    - 236 mm mortar battery
    - 3 x Miners and Sappers companies
    - Telegraph Company
    - Motor battalion
- Corps troops
  - Cyclist battalion
  - Miners battalion
- Army troops (under direct command of the British 1st Army):
  - Railway Battalion
  - Heavy Artillery Corps (10 x heavy howitzer batteries)
- Aviation service (never activated as an operational unit, with its pilots and crew serving in French aviation squadrons)
- Rearguard Base

== Remembrance ==
- www.remembrancetrails-northernfrance.com Portuguese National Cemetery – Richebourg
