= Acquaviva, San Marino =

Acquaviva Aquaviva (Romagnol)
- Castello
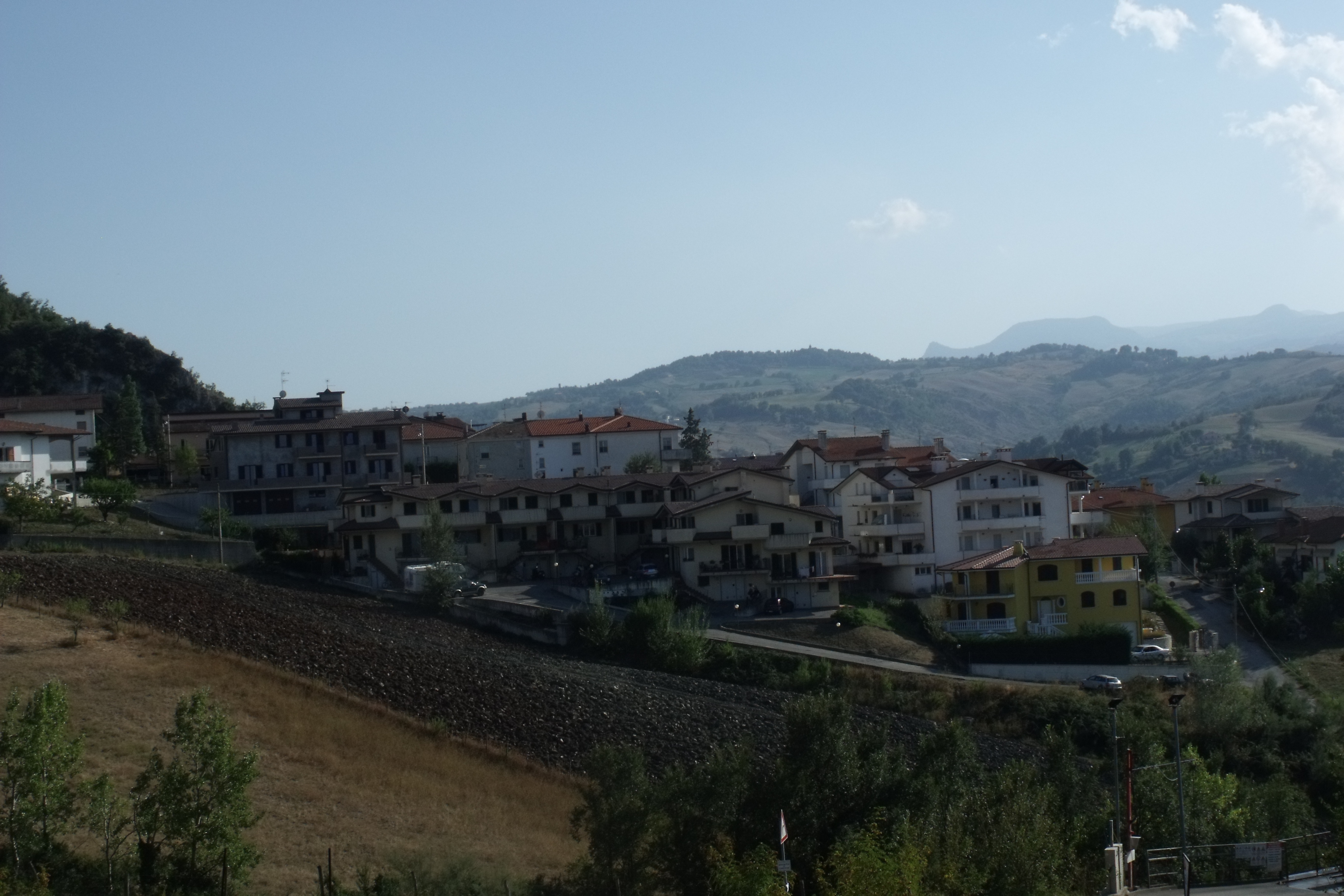
- View of Acquaviva

- Flag Coat of arms

- Acquaviva's location in San Marino

- Location within San Marino
- Coordinates: 43°56′44.52″N 12°25′6.48″E
- Country: San Marino
- Annexed to San Marino: 1243
- Curazie: List: Gualdicciolo, La Serra

Government
  - Capitano: Gabriele Cecchetti (Noi per Acquaviva; since 2025)

Area
  - Total: 4.86 km^{2} (1.88 sq mi)
- Elevation: 237 m (778 ft)

Population (January 2025)
  - Total: 2,138
- Time zone: UTC+1 (CET)
  - Summer (DST): UTC+2 (CEST)
- Postal code: 47892
- Climate: Cfa
- Website: https://www.gov.sm/pub1/GovSM/Istituzioni-e-Forze/Giunte-di-Castello/Castello-di-Acquaviva.html

Acquaviva (lit. 'Living water'; Romagnol: Aquaviva) is one of the nine castelli of San Marino.

== History ==
The municipality owes its name to a spring that rises at the foot of Monte Cerreto, a hill covered in pine trees, and with whose water, according to tradition, Saint Marinus baptized new followers of Christianity. According to legend, Marinus sought refuge in a cave in the Rupe della Baldasserona, located in the area of present-day Acquaviva, at the beginning of the 4th century. The Chiesa di Sant'Andrea, built in the Middle Ages and remodelled several times since then, stands on the remains of a building from the 3rd century, which is said to be a church built by Marinus himself on the site of a pagan place of worship previously dedicated to the Roman god Mercurius. A bronze figure depicting Mercurius sitting on a stone was found in the La Serra district. The name Acquaviva was first mentioned in 1253.

In 885, the document Placito Feretrano was issued in the Corte di Stirvano on Monte Cerreto; it is the oldest known document attesting to San Marino's independence.

On 19 December 1243, Guido di Cerreto granted the Republic of San Marino many rights, i.e. the collecting of taxes. This decision also included the castelli of Cerreto and Ventoso, which later led to their annexation.

== Geography ==
It has 2,138 inhabitants (January 2025) in an area of 4.86 km^{2}. It borders the San Marino municipalities Borgo Maggiore and San Marino and the Italian municipalities San Leo and Verucchio.

Acquaviva contains two curazie: Gualdicciolo and La Serra.

In its territory there are two significant sites for San Marino. The first, the rock of Baldasserona, is considered the location of the Titan where he stopped for the first time Saint Marino. In the rock which is in fact a large fissure, is considered the first refuge of the founder of San Marino. In fact, for San Marino, it is precisely at this point that began their history. Another place that has marked the history of San Marino is Mount Cerreto. At the foot of the hill, was the information with which the Saint baptized the first Christians of the Titano community, and hence the name of "Acquaviva". Finally, historical documents attest that "the Cerreto Castello di Monte", identified with Acquaviva, in 885 was issued the "Placito Feretrano", the oldest document of the Republic of San Marino.

=== Climate ===
Acquaviva has a humid subtropical climate (Köppen: Cfa).

Climate data for Acquaviva
Month	Jan	Feb	Mar	Apr	May	Jun	Jul	Aug	Sep	Oct	Nov	Dec	Year
Mean daily maximum °C (°F)	8.7 (47.7)	10.0 (50.0)	13.0 (55.4)	16.4 (61.5)	21.0 (69.8)	25.9 (78.6)	28.5 (83.3)	28.2 (82.8)	23.6 (74.5)	19.2 (66.6)	14.0 (57.2)	9.9 (49.8)	18.2 (64.8)
Daily mean °C (°F)	6.0 (42.8)	6.9 (44.4)	9.8 (49.6)	13.1 (55.6)	17.7 (63.9)	22.4 (72.3)	24.9 (76.8)	24.4 (75.9)	20.1 (68.2)	16.0 (60.8)	11.3 (52.3)	7.3 (45.1)	15.0 (59.0)
Mean daily minimum °C (°F)	3.7 (38.7)	4.2 (39.6)	6.7 (44.1)	9.8 (49.6)	14.2 (57.6)	18.6 (65.5)	20.9 (69.6)	20.7 (69.3)	16.8 (62.2)	13.2 (55.8)	9.0 (48.2)	5.0 (41.0)	11.9 (53.4)
Average precipitation mm (inches)	57.1 (2.25)	65.9 (2.59)	66.0 (2.60)	64.5 (2.54)	69.7 (2.74)	42.0 (1.65)	37.2 (1.46)	49.1 (1.93)	77.0 (3.03)	81.2 (3.20)	84.8 (3.34)	72.5 (2.85)	767 (30.18)
Source: Weather.Directory

== Economy ==
The town, as of 30 June 2014, has 324 companies, 100 of these are business, 72 are manufacturing and 66 are the commercial field. One of those companies is the Cesarino Distillery, which produces liquor that is sold both in San Marino and Italy. The factory opened in 1968.

== International relations ==
Acquaviva is twinned with:

- Froges, France (1984)
