= Timeline of Portuguese history (Second Republic) =

This is a historical timeline of Portugal.

== Second Republic: Dictatorial Estado Novo ==
=== 1926 ===
- May 27, The General Manuel de Oliveira Gomes da Costa arrives at Braga with the purpose of initiating a Coup d'état.
  - The Republican Government and Prime Minister António Maria da Silva, knowing of the forthcoming coup, try to organize resistance believing the uprising can be defeated.
- May 28, A Military coup d'état (henceforth known as the 28th May 1926 coup d'état) begins in Braga led by Gomes da Costa. Believing it to have failed, Gomes da Costa announces his surrender.
- May 29
  - The Portuguese Communist Party interrupts its 2nd Congress due to the political and military situation.
  - The Confederação Geral do Trabalho (national trade union center) declares its neutrality in the military confrontations.
  - The Military Coup spreads to the rest of the country, by influence of Mendes Cabeçadas, Sinel de Cordes and Óscar Carmona, and establishes the Ditadura Nacional (National Dictatorship) against the democratic but unstable 1st Republic.
  - The Government of Prime Minister António Maria da Silva resigns.
- May 30
  - The General Gomes da Costa is acclaimed in Porto.
  - The President of the Republic, Bernardino Machado, resigns.
  - José Mendes Cabeçadas Júnior becomes Prime Minister and President of the Republic.
- June 3, António de Oliveira Salazar becomes Minister of Finance; he resigns 16 days after nomination.
- June 3, The Congress of the Republic of Portugal (National Assembly) is dissolved by dictatorial decree.
- All heads of Municipalities are substituted.
  - The Carbonária (the Portuguese section of the Carbonari) is banned.
  - All Political parties are banned.
- June 17, General Gomes da Costa provokes a military coup.
- June 19, General Gomes da Costa becomes Prime Minister.
- June 22, Censorship is instituted.
- June 29, General Gomes da Costa becomes President of the Republic.
- July 9
  - General Gomes da Costa is obliged to step down and goes into exile.
  - General António Óscar de Fragoso Carmona, of the conservative military wing, becomes Prime Minister.
- September 15 - Failed military coup.
- September 18 - Failed military coup.
- November 29 - General António Óscar Carmona becomes President of the Republic.
- December 16, The Police of Information of Lisbon, a Political Police, is created.

=== 1927 ===
- February, Failed Republican revolutionary attempt against the Ditadura Nacional in Porto and Lisbon.
- March 26, The Police of Information of Porto, a Political Police, is created.
- May 17, Minimum years of schooling reduced from the 6th to the 4th grade; in all levels of non-university schooling students are divided by sex.
- The Confederação Geral do Trabalho (national trade union center) is dissolved.
- August - Failed right wing military coup.
- December 1 - Students demonstrate in Lisbon against the Ditadura Nacional.

=== 1928 ===
- February, The Comissão de Propaganda da Ditadura (Commission for the Propaganda of the Dictatorship) is created.
- March 17, The Police of Information of Porto and Lisbon are fused.
- April 18, General José Vicente de Freitas becomes Prime Minister.
- April 26, António de Oliveira Salazar becomes Minister of Finance for the 2nd time.
- General António Óscar de Fragoso Carmona remains President of the Republic.
- Acordo Missionário (Missionary Agreement) between the Catholic Church and the Portuguese Republic, giving special status to the action of the Catholic Church in Portugal's colonies.
- Failed Republican revolucionary attempt against the Ditadura Nacional.
- The Portuguese Communist Party's Main Office is closed.

=== 1929 ===
- July 8, Artur Ivens Ferraz becomes Prime Minister.
- Roman Catholic religious institutes are again permitted in Portugal.
- The Portuguese Communist Party is reorganized under Bento Gonçalves. Adapting the Party to its new illegal status, the reorganization creates a net of clandestine cells to avoid the wave of detentions.

=== 1930 ===
- January 21, Domingos da Costa e Oliveira becomes Prime Minister.
- The Acto Colonial (Colonial Act) is published, defining the status of Portuguese colonies (Angola, Cabinda, Cape Verde, Portuguese Guinea, São Tomé and Príncipe, Mozambique, Goa, Diu, Daman & Dadra and Nagar Haveli, Portuguese Timor and Macau).
- The fundamental principles of the new regime are presented by António de Oliveira Salazar on the 4th anniversary of the 28th of May Revolution.

=== 1932 ===
- July 5, António de Oliveira Salazar becomes Prime Minister.

=== 1933 ===
- A new Constitution is approved in a false referendum, defining Portugal as a Corporative, Single Party and Multi-continental country (in Europe, Africa, Asia and Oceania).
- A fascist-leaning right-wing Dictatorial regime entitled Estado Novo is installed.
- The Single Party União Nacional (National Union) is created.
- The Estatuto do Trabalho Nacional (Code of National Labour) is published, prohibiting all free trade unions.
- A Political Police, the PVDE (Polícia de Vigilância e de Defesa do Estado; State Defense and Vigilance Police) is created.
- Censorship, particularly of the Mass media, is systematic and generalized.

=== 1934 ===
- A General Strike, supported by communist and anarcho-syndicalist unions, was held on 18 January, but was quickly controlled by security forces.

=== 1935 ===
- The Portuguese Communist Party's Secretary General Bento Gonçalves participates in the 7th Congress of the Comintern. Soon after returning to Portugal he is arrested by the Political Police PVDE.

=== 1936 ===
- May 19, Creation of the Mocidade Portuguesa (Portuguese Youth), a compulsory paramilitary youth organization similar to the Hitler Youth.
- July, Beginning of the Spanish Civil War; Portugal promptly supports Nationalist Spain under General Francisco Franco and sends military aid (the Battalion of the Viriatos) in their fight against the Spanish Republicans.
- The Tarrafal concentration camp for political prisoners is opened in the colony of Cape Verde, under direct control of the political police PVDE.
- The political police PVDE focuses its action against Communism and the underground Portuguese Communist Party. During this pre-World War II period, several Italian Fascist and German Nazi advisors came to Portugal, to help the PVDE adopt a model similar to the Gestapo.

=== 1937 ===
- December, The female section of the Mocidade Portuguesa is created.

=== 1939 ===
- The Iberian Neutrality Pact is put forward by Salazar to Francisco Franco.

=== 1942 ===
- Salazar meets with Spanish dictator Francisco Franco.
- The Portuguese Communist Party's Secretary General Bento Gonçalves dies in the concentration camp of Tarrafal.

=== 1943 ===
October 8, Although officially neutral during World War II, Portugal, after considerable pressure from the Allies, allowed the British the use of the ports of Horta on Faial Island and Ponta Delgada on São Miguel Island, as well as the airfields of Lajes on Terceira Island and Santana Field on São Miguel.

=== 1945 ===
- The Political Police PVDE is reorganized and renamed PIDE (Polícia Internacional de Defesa do Estado; International Police for the Defense of the State).
- October 8, The MUD (Movimento de Unidade Democrática - Movement of Democratic Unity) is created with official permission.

=== 1948 ===
- January, The MUD is banned.

=== 1949 ===
- April 4, Portugal is a founding member of NATO.
- The President António Óscar Carmona meets with Spanish dictator Francisco Franco.
- Spanish dictator Francisco Franco receives a Doctorate honoris causa by the University of Coimbra.
- In the (fraudulent) Presidential elections, General Norton de Matos, backed by the oppositionist illegal organization MUD tries and fail to win the Presidency of the Republic.

=== 1951 ===
- António de Oliveira Salazar becomes Provisional President of the Republic due to the death of President António Óscar de Fragoso Carmona.
- Francisco Higino Craveiro Lopes becomes President of the Republic.
- The Portuguese government overhauls the entire colonial system in an attempt to curb criticism on Portuguese Colonialism: all Portugal's colonies were renamed Portuguese Overseas Provinces.

=== 1954 ===
- The Dadra and Nagar Haveli Portuguese enclave, dependent of Daman, is occupied by India.

=== 1956 ===
- Amílcar Cabral founds the PAIGC (Partido Africano da Independência da Guiné e Cabo Verde, African Party for the Independence of Guinea and Cape Verde).
- December, The MPLA, Movimento Popular de Libertação de Angola (Popular Movement for the Liberation of Angola), is founded by Agostinho Neto.

=== 1957 ===
- The FNLA - Frente Nacional de Libertação de Angola (National Front for the Liberation of Angola), is founded as União das Populações do Norte de Angola (Union of the Populations of Northern Angola).

=== 1958 ===
- Américo Thomaz becomes President of the Republic.

=== 1959 ===
- Pijiguiti Massacre - Portuguese soldiers open fire on protesting dockworkers in Bissau (Portuguese Guinea), killing 50.

=== 1960 ===
- January, A group of ten Portuguese Communist Party members escaped from the high-security prison in Peniche. Among the escapees was Álvaro Cunhal.
- January 4, Portugal is one of the founding member of the EFTA - European Free Trade Association.

=== 1961 ===
- February 4, The Portuguese Colonial War starts in Angola with the attacks on the Prison, Police headquarters and Radio station in Luanda.
- March 15, Attacks in northern Angola by the UPA (União do Povo Angolano; Union of the Angolan People), against Portuguese colonists and African populations, causing hundreds of deaths.
- The Prime Minister António de Oliveira Salazar takes on himself the office of Minister of National Defense and reorganizes the Government to face the war in Africa.
- December 12, the Indian army conquers Portuguese Goa.
- December 19, the Indian army conquers Portuguese Daman and Diu.

=== 1962 ===
- June 25, The FRELIMO - Frente de Libertação de Moçambique (Mozambican Liberation Front) is founded in Dar es Salaam (Tanzania).
- The PAIGC Guerrilla warfare against the Portuguese begins with an abortive attack on Praia.
- March 24 - The Academic Crisis of '62 culminates in a huge student demonstration in Lisbon brutally repressed by the shock police, which caused hundreds of students to be seriously injured.

=== 1963 ===
- The FLEC (Frente para a Libertação do Enclave de Cabinda; Front for the Liberation of the Enclave of Cabinda) is founded.
- January, Amílcar Cabral and PAIGC declare full-scale war against the Portuguese in Guinea.

=== 1964 ===
- The FRELIMO controls most of Northern Mozambique.
- February, The first Party Congress of the PAIGC takes place at liberated Cassaca, in which both the political and military arms of the PAIGC were assessed and reorganised, with a regular army (The People's Army) to supplement the guerilla forces (The People's Guerillas).

=== 1965 ===
- 6th Congress of the Portuguese Communist Party, one of the most important congresses in the Party's history, after Álvaro Cunhal released the report The Path to Victory – The tasks of the Party in the National and Democratic Revolution, which became an important document in the anti-fascist struggle.

=== 1966 ===
- August 6, The Salazar Bridge is inaugurated in Lisbon above the Tagus river. It is the longest suspension bridge in Europe and a replica (made by the same engineers) of the Golden Gate bridge in San Francisco.
- The UNITA - União Nacional para a Independência Total de Angola (National Union for Total Independence of Angola) is founded by Jonas Savimbi.

=== 1967 ===
- By this time the PAIGC had carried out 147 attacks on Portuguese barracks and army encampments, and effectively controlled 2/3 of Portuguese Guinea.

=== 1968 ===
- Reorganisation of the Government.
- September 25, António de Oliveira Salazar leaves the Government due to health problems.
- September 28, Marcello das Neves Alves Caetano becomes Prime Minister.
- Portugal begins a new campaign against the guerillas in Portuguese Guinea with the arrival of the new governor of the colony, General António de Spínola.

=== 1969 ===
- The Single Party União Nacional is renamed Acção Nacional Popular (National Popular Action).
- The Political Police PIDE is renamed DGS (Direcção Geral de Segurança, Directorate-General of Security).
- Beginning of the Primavera Marcelista (Marcelist Springtime), a timid and failed opening of the regime.

=== 1970 ===
- July 27, Death of António de Oliveira Salazar.
- Portugal invades Conakry, in the Republic of Guinea, 400 amphibious troops attacked the city and freed hundreds of Portuguese Prisoners of war kept there by the PAIGC.

=== 1973 ===
- January, Amílcar Cabral, leader of the PAIGC, is assassinated in Conakry by a disgruntled former associate under influence of the Portuguese Political Police DGS.
- September 24, Independence of Guinea-Bissau (Portuguese Guinea) is unilaterally declared.
- November, A United Nations' General Assembly vote recognizes the Independence of Guinea-Bissau, unprecedented as it denounced illegal Portuguese aggression and occupation and was prior to complete control and Portuguese recognition.

=== 1974 ===
- The Carnation Revolution of the 25 April puts an end to five decades of dictatorship.

== See also ==
- History of Portugal
- Timeline of Portuguese history
  - Timeline of Portuguese history (First Republic)
  - Timeline of Portuguese history (Third Republic)
