= Tomás António Garcia Rosado =

General Tomás António Garcia Rosado KCMG
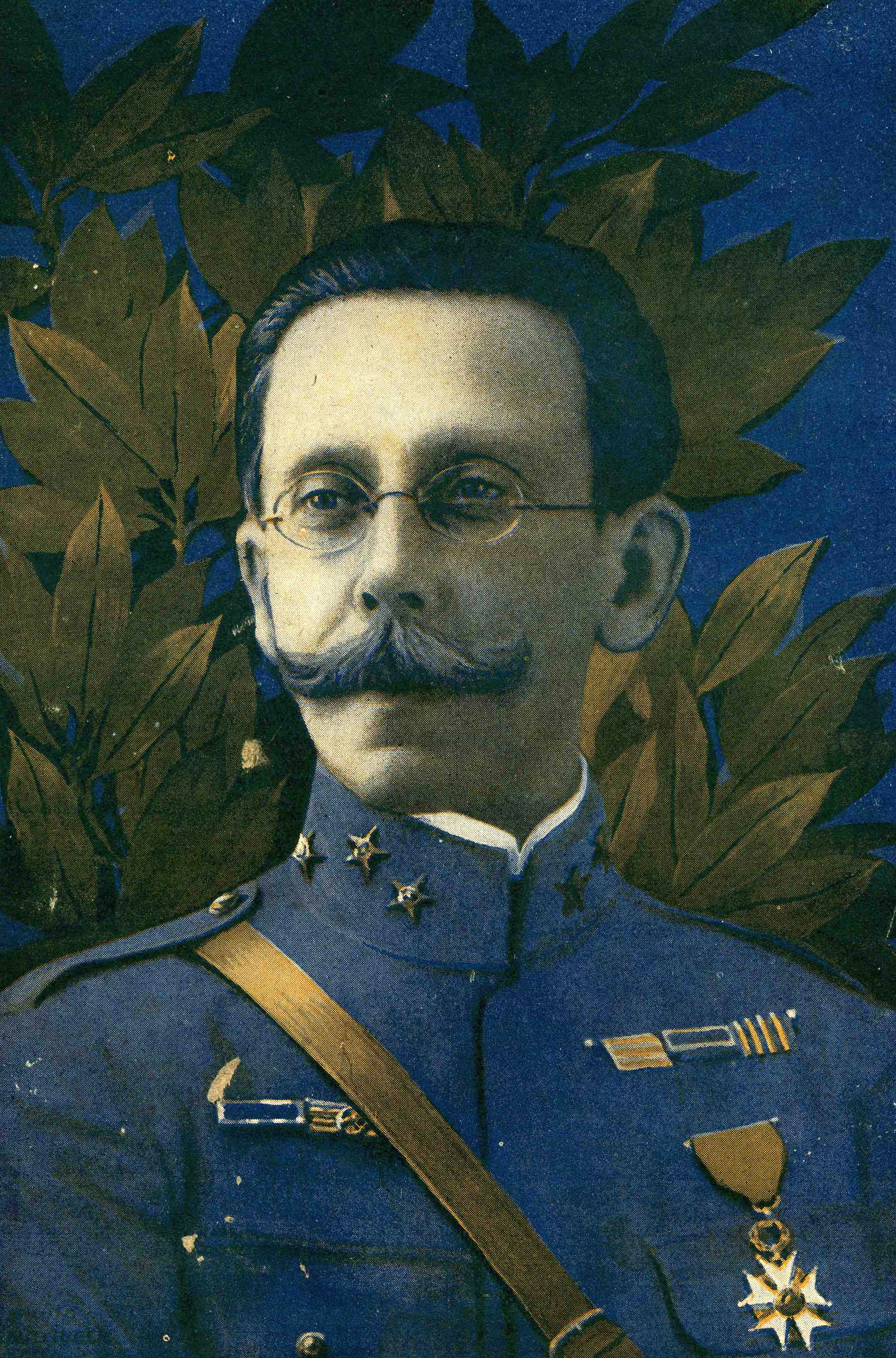
- Born: 4 March 1854; Salvador, Beja, Portugal
- Died: 30 August 1937 (aged 83); Santa Maria, Sintra, Portugal
- Spouse: Maria Adelaide da Costa
- Children: Maria José Garcia Adelaide Garcia Adelaide; Álvaro Garcia Adelaide; Albertina Garcia Adelaide; Ilda Garcia Adelaide; Margarida Garcia Adelaide; Manoel Garcia Adelaide
- Relatives: José Francisco Rosado (father); Angélica do Carmo Garcia Rosado (mother)
- Military career
- Allegiance: Kingdom of Portugal; Portugal
- Branch: Portuguese Army
- Service years: 1875–1934
- Rank: General
- Unit: Portuguese Expeditionary Corps
- Conflicts: WW1: Western Front

Governor-General of Mozambique
- In office December 1902 – February 1905
- Monarch: Carlos I
- Prime Minister: Ernesto Hintze Ribeiro; José Luciano de Castro
- Minister of the Navy and Overseas: António Teixeira de Sousa; Manuel Rafael Gorjão; Manuel Moreira Júnior
- Preceded by: Manuel Rafael Gorjão
- Succeeded by: João António de Azevedo Coutinho Fragoso de Sequeira

Commander of the Portuguese Expeditionary Corps
- In office 25 August – 11 November 1918
- President: Sidónio Pais
- Secretary of State for War: Amílcar de Castro Abreu e Mota; Álvaro César de Mendonça; Manuel Moreira Júnior
- Preceded by: Fernando Tamagnini de Abreu e Silva
- Succeeded by: Corps dissolved

Ambassador of Portugal to the United Kingdom
- In office 10 August 1926 – 28 May 1933
- President: Óscar Carmona
- Prime Minister: Óscar Carmona; José Vicente de Freitas; Artur Ivens Ferraz; Domingos Oliveira; António de Oliveira Salazar
- Minister of Foreign Affairs: António Maria de Bettencourt Rodrigues; José Vicente de Freitas; Aníbal de Mesquita Guimarães (as interim); Manuel Quintão Meireles; Aníbal de Mesquita Guimarães (as interim); Manuel Quintão Meireles; Artur Ivens Ferraz (as interim); Henrique Trindade Coelho; Artur Ivens Ferraz (as interim); Jaime da Fonseca Monteiro; Fernando Augusto Branco; Jaime da Fonseca Monteiro(as interim); Aníbal de Mesquita Guimarães (as interim); José Caeiro da Mata
- Preceded by: José Norton de Matos
- Succeeded by: Rui Ennes Ulrich

Tomás António Garcia Rosado, KCMG (4 March 1854 – 30 August 1937) was an infantry officer and general of the Portuguese Army.

== Life ==
In 1895, after accompanying Afonso, Duke of Porto to Portuguese India, he received the 344th Grand Cross in the Order of the Tower and Sword.

He stayed in Mozambique in 1897–1898, and returned there to be Governor between 1902 and 1905.

As a general, he replaced on 25 August 1918 Fernando Tamagnini de Abreu e Silva as commander of the Portuguese Expeditionary Corps (CEP), a 55,000 men army corps that fought with the Allies in the Western Front, during World War I.

After his return, he became chief of the General Staff of the Portuguese Army between 1919 and 1924. Between 1926 and 1934, he was Portuguese Ambassador to the United Kingdom.
