= José Vicente de Freitas =

Portuguese politician

General José Vicente de Freitas GCTE ComA GCA
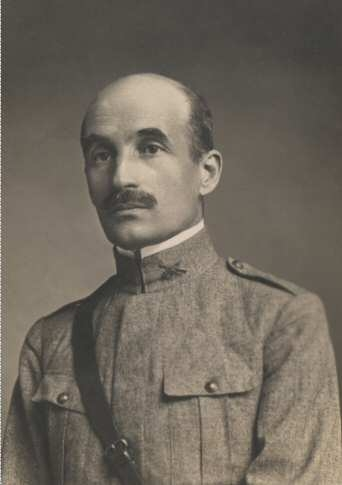
- Formal portrait, c. 1926

Prime Minister of Portugal
- In office 18 April 1928 – 8 July 1929
- President: Óscar Carmona
- Preceded by: Óscar Carmona
- Succeeded by: Artur Ivens Ferraz

55th Governor of the Autonomous District of Funchal
- In office 9 February 1915 – 24 May 1915
- Preceding: Sebastião Sancho Gil de Borja de Macedo e Meneses Correia de Herédia
- Succeeded by: Sebastião Sancho Gil de Borja de Macedo e Meneses Correia de Herédia

54th Mayor of Lisbon
- In office 2 July 1926 – 31 December 1934
- Appointed by: National Dictatorship
- Preceded by: João Catanho de Meneses
- Succeeded by: Adriano da Costa Macedo

137th Minister of Interior of Portugal
- In office 26 August 1927 – 8 July 1929
- President: Óscar Carmona (1927-1928); José Vicente de Freitas(1928-1929)
- Prime Minister: Óscar Carmona; Himself
- Preceding: Adriano da Costa Macedo
- Succeeded by: Artur Ivens Ferraz

Minister of Finance of Portugal
- Interim; 18 April – 27 April 1928
- President: Óscar Carmona
- Prime Minister: Himself
- Preceded by: João José Sinel de Cordes
- Succeeded by: António de Oliveira Salazar

Minister of Foreign Affairs of Portugal
- Interim; 13 October – 15 October 1928
- President: Óscar Carmona
- Prime Minister: Himself
- Preceded by: António Maria de Bettencourt Rodrigues
- Succeeded by: António Maria de Bettencourt Rodrigues

Minister of Commerce and Communication of Portugal
- Interim; 11 January – 8 July 1929
- President: Óscar Carmona
- Prime Minister: Himself
- Preceded by: Eduardo Aguiar de Bragança
- Succeeded by: João Antunes Guimarães

Personal details
- Born: 22 January 1869 Calheta, Madeira
- Died: 4 September 1952 (aged 83) Lisbon
- Spouse: Maria Beatriz de Freitas Neto de Freitas
- Relations: Jorge Joaquim de Freitas (brother); Manuel dos Passos Freitas (brother); Francisco João de Freitas (brother); João Nepomuceno de Freitas (brother); José Maria de Freitas (brother); Júlio de Freitas (brother); Maria José de Freitas Fernandes (sister)
- Children: Óscar de Freitas Neto; Beatriz de Freitas Neto; Emídio de Freitas Neto
- Parent(s): Joaquim de Freitas (father); Sofia Amélia de Freitas (mother)

Military service
- Allegiance: Kingdom of Portugal; Portugal
- Branch/service: (Kingdom of Portugal) (Portugal) Portuguese Army (Portugal) Portuguese Expeditionary Corps
- Years of service: 1887–1928
- Rank: General
- Battles/wars: WW1; 28 May 1926 coup d'état

José Vicente de Freitas, 2nd Baron of Freitas GCTE ComA GCA (Portuguese pronunciation: [ʒuˈzɛ viˈsẽtɨ ðɨ ˈfɾɐjtɐʃ]; 22 January 1869 – 4 September 1952) was a Portuguese military officer and politician.

De Freitas was born in Calheta, Madeira. He fought in Flanders during Portuguese participation in World War I, and was awarded the Grand-Cross of the Order of the Tower and Sword, the highest Portuguese decoration.

He was a colonel when the 28 May 1926 movement took place. He supported the Ditadura Nacional and was Instruction Minister from 1927 to 1929. He served as Prime Minister (President of the Council of Ministers), from 18 April 1928 until 8 July 1929, shortly after being promoted to general. He died in Lisbon with the rank of General.

== Family ==
He was the son of José Joaquim de Freitas and Sofia Amélia de Freitas, who had eight children. Vicente de Freitas was brother to:

- Jorge Joaquim de Freitas (1870–1941)
- Manuel dos Passos Freitas (1872–1952) - Lawyer and Musician.
- Francisco João de Freitas (1874–1958)
- João Nepomuceno de Freitas (1877–1953) - Colonel and Doctor. As his brother he joined CEP in the battle of La Lys. He was later appointed general director of Lisbon's Hospitals in 1927, during the tenancy of Óscar Carmona's Government, while his brother was Minister of Interior.
- José Maria de Freitas (1879–1958)
- Júlio de Freitas (1881–1882)
- Maria José de Freitas Fernandes (1885–1952)

He married in 1891 Maria Beatriz de Freitas Neto de Freitas, with whom he had three children: Óscar, Beatriz and Emídio.

== Military and academic career ==
After his studies in Madeira - in Calheta and Funchal - he left for the mainland to start a military career, where he volunteered for the Hunter Regiment No. 12 (1887), as 1st Corporal, then as 1st Corporal Junior Officer (1889), being promoted to Second Lieutenant (1891), Lieutenant (1886), Captain (1904), Major (1913), Lieutenant Colonel (1917), Colonel (1919) and having reached General (1928).

In his military capacity coordinated cartography works, including the Lisbon Plan with all the improvements made and projected in the city (circa 1910), a map of outstanding technical and artistic quality.

During his military career, he played an important role, having been part of the Portuguese Expeditionary Corps in France during World War I (1917–18).

He has also devoted himself to teaching, either as author of drawing textbooks for secondary education or as a course organizer for the Army Corporal and Sergeant School. He was professor of the National School since 1895, an institution of which he was director after 1917.

After his political career, he rejoined the military career, ending it as director of the Military Academy(1935–1939).

== Political career ==
As a military man, he did not intend to get involved in politics, but events and his prestige determined that he should, for the positions he eventually held in the political context.

Thus, in a country in political turmoil, since the events leading up to the coup of 5 October 1910 then as captain, he supported King Manuel II.

His active participation in political life began in 1915 - when General Pimenta de Castro was President of the Republic and Manuel de Arriaga was head of government - he was invited to the position of Civil Governor of Funchal between February and May 1915. He would later be elected as a deputy by the Funchal circle through the Governmental Party.

His greatest involvement in national political life began on May 28, 1926, with a march led by General Gomes da Costa from Braga to Lisbon, to restore normalcy and order, following the instability and governing crisis of the First Republic. This march would then give rise to the II Republic, that would become in 1933 known as Estado Novo.

=== Prime Minister of Portugal ===
In 1928, General Óscar Carmona, was elected president and appointed Vicente de Freitas to form government, as President of the Council of Ministers (Prime-Minister.) He appointed as Minister of Finance, the then Coimbra Professor, António Oliveira Salazar.

In February 1928, Vicente de Freitas visited Fátima, as a sign of validation of his political power and his commitment to the apparitions/visions.

The Vicente de Freitas government resigned in July 1929, after a disagreement with a party represented by Mário de Figueiredo and Oliveira Salazar over separation of church and state.

=== Mayor of Lisbon ===
Between 1926 and 1933 he was appointed Mayor of the Lisbon City Council Administrative Commission.

Following his resignation as Prime-Minister he expressed his dissenting position on a conservative, nationalist constitutional revision project and the rise of the National Union as a single party, contrary to the objectives of its creation. In his sharp criticisms, published in the media, he concluded that "If States have to be strong, then freedom of thought cannot cease to exist." This would motivate Oliveira Salazar to dismiss him from the capital, on 15 February 1933; his term would nevertheless end on paper on 31 December 1934, thus ending his political career.

== Honours ==
=== National honours ===
- Commander of the Order of Aviz, (15 February 1919)
- Grand-Cross of the Order of the Tower and Sword, (25 August 1928)
- Grand-Cross of the Order of Aviz (24 June 1932)

=== Foreign honours ===
- Grand-Cross of the Order of the Crown of Italy, Italy (4 August 1930)
- Grand Officer of the National Order of Merit of Carlos Manuel de Céspedes (24 June 1932)

Political offices
Preceded by Óscar Carmona	Prime Minister of Portugal; 1928–1929	Succeeded by Artur Ivens Ferraz
