= Portuguese Republics =

Three states have borne the name Portuguese Republic (República Portuguesa) since 5 October 1910 revolution and the abolition of the monarchy in Portugal:

- First Portuguese Republic (1910–1926), lasting until the 28 May 1926 coup d'état
- Second Portuguese Republic (1926–1974)
  - Ditadura Nacional (1926–1933)
  - Estado Novo (1933–1974)
- Third Portuguese Republic (1974–present), since the Carnation Revolution
