= Second Dynasty (disambiguation) =

Second Dynasty most often refers to Second Dynasty of Egypt.

Second Dynasty may also refer to:

- Second Babylonian dynasty
- Second Dynasty of Isin, Babylon
- Second Shō Dynasty, Ryukyu Islands, Japan
- Second Dynasty of Ur
- Second Zhou Dynasty, China
- Second dynasty XI-XII centuries, Serbia

== See also ==
- Timeline of Portuguese history (Second Dynasty)
