= Coup of 1926 =

Coup of 1926 might refer to several historical events:

- May Coup in Poland (May 12–14)
- 28 May 1926 coup d'état in Portugal
- 1926 Lithuanian coup d'état (December 17)
