= Timeline of Portuguese history (First Republic) =

This is a historical timeline of Portugal.

== First Republic ==
=== 1910 ===
- October 4 - Beginning of the Republican Revolution. The Republic is proclaimed in Loures, just north of Lisbon.
- October 5
  - The Republican Revolution, supported by popular uprising and virtually no resistance, is victorious and puts an end to the Monarchy.
  - The last King of Portugal, Manuel II of Portugal, and the Portuguese Royal Family embark in Ericeira for exile in England.
  - The Republic is officially proclaimed in Lisbon.

=== 1917 ===
- Portugal joins the allied forces in World War I.

=== 1921 ===
- The Portuguese Communist Party was founded from the ranks of the Portuguese Maximalist Federation as the Portuguese Section of the Communist International.

=== 1925 ===
- Bernardino Machado is elected President of the Republic for the 2nd time.

=== 1926 ===
- The 28 May 1926 military coup d'état ends the 1st Portuguese Republic.

== See also ==
- History of Portugal
- Timeline of Portuguese history
  - Timeline of Portuguese history (Fourth Dynasty)
  - Timeline of Portuguese history (Second Republic)
