= Timeline of Portuguese history (Third Dynasty) =

This is a historical timeline of Portugal.

== Third Dynasty: Habsburg (Spanish rule) ==
=== 16th century ===
- 1580
  - Invasion of Portugal by a Spanish army commanded by Fernando Álvarez de Toledo, Duke of Alba.
  - Battle of Alcântara between Portuguese and Spanish forces.
  - The Fortress of St. Julian, in Lisbon, surrenders to the Spanish.
  - Anthony of Portugal, the Prior of Crato, is acclaimed King of Portugal in Santarém.
  - Death of Luís de Camões, Portugal's national poet.
  - Beginning of the Cortes (General Assembly of the Kingdom) of Tomar.
- 1581
  - Philip II of Spain is acclaimed in the Cortes of Tomar as King Philip I of Portugal in a personal union of the Crowns. Portugal loses de facto independence to Spain.
  - Anthony of Portugal, the Prior of Crato, takes refuge in England.
  - The Azores refuse to recognize Philip I of Portugal as King.
- 1582
  - The Spanish Fleet of Santa Cruz defeats the Portuguese-French Fleet of Strozzi in the Azores.
  - Introduction of the Gregorian Calendar in Portugal.
- 1583
  - Cortes in Lisbon.
  - King Philip I of Portugal departs for Madrid and leaves the government of Portugal with Portuguese trustees.
  - The Azores are submitted.
  - Francis Drake attacks Portuguese Brazil.
- 1589 – Anthony of Portugal, the Prior of Crato, attacks Lisbon with English aid, but with no success.
- 1595 – Anthony of Portugal, the Prior of Crato, dies in Paris.
- 1598 – Philip III of Spain becomes Philip II of Portugal.

=== 17th century ===
- 1621 – Philip IV of Spain becomes Philip III of Portugal.

== See also ==
- Timeline of Portuguese history
  - Second Dynasty: Aviz (14th to 16th century)
  - Fourth Dynasty: Bragança (17th to 20th century)
