= Timeline of Portuguese history (Third Republic) =

This is a historical timeline of Portugal.

== Third Republic: Democracy ==
=== 1974 ===
- April 25, The Carnation Revolution puts an end to the authoritarian regime of Estado Novo. Prime-minister Marcello Caetano exiled to Brazil.

=== 1975 ===
- Independence is granted to all Portuguese colonies in Africa and independence is promised to East Timor.
- March 11, A right-wing coup fails: A turn to the left in the revolution happens and major industries and big properties are nationalized by government
- August 2, A meeting takes place in Haga (near Stockholm in Sweden) where the Committee for Friendship and Solidarity with Democracy and Socialism in Portugal is created. This Committee supported democratic trends in Portugal and opposed pro-soviet communist tendencies. In the meeting were present Olof Palme, Harold Wilson, Helmut Schmidt, Bruno Kreisky, Joop den Uyl, Trygve Bratteli, Anker Jørgensen, Yitzhak Rabin, Hans Janitschek, Willy Brandt, James Callaghan, François Mitterrand, Bettino Craxi and Mário Soares.
- November 25, A coup removes far-left influence in politics
- December 7, East Timor is violently annexed by Indonesia

=== 1976 ===
- April 2, a new Constitution is approved. The Constitutional Assembly disestablishes itself.
- April 25, the Constitution of 1976 enters into force.
- November 19, Jaime Ornelas Camacho becomes the first President of the Regional Government of Madeira.

=== 1980 ===
- December 4, Prime minister Francisco Sá Carneiro and the Minister of Defence Amaro da Costa died in a plane crash, in strange circumstances.

=== 1984 ===
- Carlos Lopes wins the first Olympic gold medal for Portugal in the Los Angeles '84 marathon

=== 1986 ===
- January 1, Portugal becomes a member of the European Economic Community, today's European Union

=== 1998 ===
- Lisbon organizes the World's Fair Expo '98
- June 28, in the first Portuguese abortion referendum, the proposal to allow an abortion until 10 weeks of pregnancy is rejected by 50.91% of the voters. This is the first referendum in the history of the Portuguese democracy.
- November 8, in the regionalisation referendum, a proposal to establish, in mainland Portugal, eight administrative regions and to disestablish the 18 districts, is rejected in the polls: on the first question, the simple institution of the administrative regions is rejected by 60.67% of the voters; in the second question, the proposal to create eight regions is rejected by 60.62% of the voters. This is the first referendum in the history of Portugal to have more than one question.

=== 1999 ===
- December 20, Macau, the last overseas Portuguese colony, is returned to China

=== 2001 ===
- March 4, Hintze Ribeiro Bridge collapse: 59 people died in the collapse of an old bridge over the Douro river. Hours after the accident, Jorge Coelho, Minister of Social Infrastructure, resigns.

=== 2002 ===
- January 1, Portugal adopts the euro as currency.

=== 2004 ===
- Summer, 2004 European Football Championship is held in Portugal

=== 2006 ===
- The Dakar Rally, the longest and, arguably, the hardest off-road rally in the world starts in Lisbon.

=== 2007 ===
- February 11, in the second Portuguese abortation referendum, almost 9 years after the first, the proposal to allow the abortion until 10 weeks of pregnancy is now approved by 50,91% of the voters.

=== 2010 ===
- May 17, the law that allows same-sex marriage is approved by the Portuguese President of the Republic, Aníbal Cavaco Silva.

=== 2017 ===
- June: June 2017 Portugal wildfires in central Portugal killing more 60 people and 250 injured.
- 28 June, military base Tancos arms theft scandal.

== See also ==
- History of Portugal
- Timeline of Portuguese history
  - Timeline of Portuguese history (Second Republic)
