= Timeline of Portuguese history (Fourth Dynasty) =

This is a historical timeline of Portugal.

== Fourth dynasty: Bragança ==
=== 17th century ===
- 1640, December 1: a small group of conspirators storms the Palace in Lisbon and deposes the Spanish Governor, Margaret, Duchess of Mantua. The Duke of Bragança, head of the senior family of the Portuguese nobility (and descended from a bastard of João I), accepts the throne as Dom João IV of Portugal, despite deep personal reluctance, by popular acclaim and at the urging of his wife. His entire reign will be dominated by the struggle to establish and maintain independence from Spain. Francisco de Lucena, secretary to the governing council of Portugal for the past 36 years and thus the most experienced bureaucrat in the country, smoothly changes his loyalties and becomes chief minister of the restored monarchy.
- 1641 The Inquisition attempts to derail the national restoration by giving its support to a counter-revolution mounted by a duke, a marquis, three earls and an archbishop. The plot fails, quelled by Francisco de Lucena, who has the ringleaders executed, but it initiates a 28-year-long war of independence against Spain punctuated by frequent internal threats to the stability of the new regime. Meanwhile, the Dutch renew their attack on Angola and capture the most extensive Portuguese slaving grounds in Africa, including the Angolan port of Luanda. The Portuguese garrison flees upriver while trying to decide whether to declare continuing loyalty to the Habsburgs, accept Dutch rule or declare for João IV. They choose the House of Bragança and appeal to the Portuguese colony of Brazil for help in fending off African and Dutch attacks on their enclave. Salvador de Sá, leader of Rio de Janeiro, persuaded by the Jesuits in Brazil, also declares for King João and responds to the Angolan appeal.
- 1644 – Elvas withstands a nine-day siege by Spanish troops.
- 1648 – The Brazilians under Salvador de Sá land in Angola, expel the Dutch and restore the African colony to Portugal.
- 1654 – Anglo-Portuguese treaty between João IV and Oliver Cromwell signed at Westminster. João agrees to prevent the molestation of the traders of the English Protector; they are allowed to use their own bible and bury their dead according to Protestant rites on Catholic soil. The Brazilians drive the Dutch out of the great plantation colonies of the north-east, re-establishing the territorial integrity of Portugal's South American empire.
- 1656 – Death of João IV after a reign of 15 years. His Queen now reigns as Regent for their son, Afonso VI of Portugal. She seeks an accommodation with Spain. Portugal loses control of Colombo in Ceylon when it is captured by the Dutch.
- 1659 – The Treaty of the Pyrenees ends Spain's long war with France, and Spanish troops are freed once more to suppress the Portuguese ‘rebellion’. The Spaniards besiege Monção and are driven off by the Countess of Castelo Melhor.
- 1660 – On the restoration of Charles II in Britain, the Queen-Regent re-negotiates the treaty of 1654. Portugal is allowed to recruit soldiers and horses in England for the fight against Spain; and to seek out 4,000 fighting men in Scotland and Ireland and charter 24 English ships to carry them. The expeditionary force is to be issued with English weapons on arrival in Portugal and guaranteed religious freedom of worship.
- 1661 – Catarina da Bragança, sister of Afonso VI, marries Charles II of Great Britain on 31 May. She brings to London a dowry of 2,000,000 gold pieces, the practice of drinking afternoon tea, and England is given colonial toe-holds in the Portuguese Empire at Tangier and Bombay. Servicing the wedding debt burdens the Portuguese exchequer for the next half-century, and this marriage with a Protestant monarch is deeply unpopular with that section of the Portuguese nobility which favours alliance with France.
- 1662 – In a palace coup d'état in Lisbon a restive younger faction of the nobility, supported by the young Afonso VI, overthrows the Queen Regent and installs the 26-year-old Luís de Vasconcelos e Sousa, 3rd Count of Castelo Melhor as ‘dictator’ to prosecute the war with Spain. The adolescent (and possibly retarded) king is married to a French princess and the young dictator models his government on the royal absolutism of the Bourbon dynasty. Opposition to this pro-French absolutism (from the King's sister the Queen of England, and his younger brother Prince Pedro) is swept aside, and Castelo Melhor initiates the final, successful phase of the Portuguese war of restoration with the aid of the Franco-German Marshal Schomberg, who brilliantly commands an international mercenary army against the Spanish forces.
- 1665 – 17 June, Portugal is finally victorious at the Battle of Montes Claros, in which Schomberg defeats the Spanish army under the Prince of Parma; Spain ceases to make war, but peace will not be signed for another three years.
- 1667 – Castelo Melhor and his Francophile party are overthrown in a new palace revolution. Prince Pedro, leader of the Anglophile party, becomes Regent for Afonso VI, who is declared incapable of governing and removed to the Azores. The French alliance is rejected, though Pedro shores up his political position by marrying his brother's estranged Queen. Castelo Melhor flees into exile (ironically, to England).
- 1668 – Peace treaty with Spain ends nearly 30 years of war. Spain restores to Portugal all her former possessions and territory with the exception of Ceuta in Morocco. Portugal remains economically weak, however, agriculturally undeveloped and dependent on British grain and trade goods generally, especially woven cloth. The Count of Ericeira, economic adviser to the Prince Regent, advocates the development of a native textile industry modelled on Flemish lines. ‘Factories’ are established at Covilhã with easy access to flocks of sheep and clean mountain water, but are highly unpopular with both town consumers and traditional weavers. Meanwhile, Portuguese attempts to develop a silk industry are fiercely resisted by the French, who wish to monopolize that market.
- 1683 – Death of Afonso VI. Pedro II becomes king.
- 1690 – Suicide of Luís de Meneses, Count of Ericeira.
- 1692 – Great drought disrupts Portuguese silk production.
- 1697 – Discovery of gold in the interior of São Paulo province, Brazil.

=== 18th century ===
- 1700 – Brazil now producing 50,000 ounces of gold per year.
- 1703 – Sir John Methuen negotiates a Military Treaty with Portugal on 16 May, giving Britain an entry to Portugal at a time when the Bourbon dynastic alliance of France and Spain appears to threaten English access to the Continent. This is followed on 27 December by the commercial Methuen Treaty, signed to stimulate trade with Britain. This (which lasts until 1810) opens up new markets for Portuguese wine but helps to destroy the native textile industry by letting in British cloth at preferential rates. The fashion for Portuguese wine in Britain (which has banned the import of French wine due to the war of the Spanish Succession, which will last until 1714) makes the wine trade so profitable and competitive that over the next 40 years inferior wines, often adulterated and artificially coloured are passed off as the genuine article – giving ‘port’ a bad name.
- 1705 – Brazil is now producing 600,000 ounces of gold per year. For the second time in its history, Portugal controls one of the greatest gold-producing sources in the world.
- 1706 — João V of Portugal becomes king. He presides over a great flowering of Portuguese art and culture underpinned by the fabulous wealth provided by Brazilian gold. Social and economic reform are neglected for the next 40 years, and the pious King indulges in a penchant for fabulously expensive building. The Portuguese royal family is now the wealthiest in Europe and João V even considers moving his throne and court to Rio de Janeiro. The taxation of the Brazilian trade brings in an enormous personal revenue to the monarch and he is able to construct an absolutist regime similar to that of the French Kings, concentrating on pomp and ceremony at court. There is however no attention to the impoverished national agriculture, inadequate transport, neglected merchant navy and minimal industrial development of the country since corn and cloth can easily be exported, foreign ships can be hired and ‘every problem in Portugal can be solved by the King’s gift of a little basket of gold coins bearing his effigy’. Meanwhile, the Brazilian gold rush continues and civil war breaks out between the mining camps of Portuguese immigrants lately come to the north of the country and the Paulistas of southern Brazil who discovered the gold in the first place.
- 1717 – Beginning of construction of the great palace-monastery of Mafra, which João V vowed on the birth of his heir, and which he intends as a rival to the Escorial. The elegance of the suites and courtyards are matched by the costliness of the furnishings in more than 1,000 rooms. The scale of the buildings and formal gardens is stupendous in relation to the impoverished countryside around it. However the roped gangs of forced labourers and the military regiment which controls them provides local employment throughout a generation, particularly in the servicing of the 7,000 carts and wagons and feeding of draught animals.
- 1732 – Disaster at Elvas: lightning strikes the gunpowder magazine in the castle. The explosion and fire kill 1500 people and destroy 823 houses.
- 1735 – Completion of the palace-monastery at Mafra.
- 1742 – João V orders the construction in Rome of the Capela de São João Baptista for installation in the Igreja de São Roque to honour his patron saint and to requite the Pope, whom he has persuaded to confer a patriarchate on Lisbon. For its size, this is reckoned the most expensive building ever constructed. Designed by the papal architect Vanvitelli, and using the most costly materials available including ivory, agate, porphyry and lapis lazuli, the chapel is erected in the Vatican in order that the Pope may celebrate Mass in it before it is dismantled and shipped to Portugal.
- 1750 — Death of João V. His son José I of Portugal becomes king. His powerful chief minister, Sebastião de Melo, Marquis of Pombal, embarks on a programme of reform to drag Portugal into the 18th century.
- 1752 – Building of the rococo palace of Queluz.
- 1755 – The Great earthquake of Portugal is the most shattering natural phenomenon of the Age of Enlightenment. Striking at 9.30 am on All Saints' Day (1 November), it destroys much of Lisbon and many towns in parts of the Alentejo and Algarve (Faro, Lagos and Albufeira are devastated). In Lisbon, three major shocks within ten minutes, a host of rapidly spreading fires touched off by the candles of a hundred church altars, and a vast tsunami that engulfs the seafront, leave 40,000 dead out of a total population of 270,000. The Alfama district of the old city is largely untouched owing to its situation on a rocky massif, as is Belem. The Customs House is flooded and the India House and the English Factory destroyed, so that no trade can legitimately be conducted. The King proves himself able in crisis management and his illegitimate half-brothers, the royal dukes, organize defence, security, the burying of the dead and the continuance of religious observance. The disaster is described by Voltaire in Candide. Rebuilding begins immediately under the vigorous direction of Pombal, who now consolidates his position as Portugal's enlightened despot and leading statesman. It is decided to reconstruct Lisbon as the finest city in Europe, on the grid plan already adopted in the leading cities of Spanish America.
- 1759, January 13 — All members of the Távora family are executed for high-treason and attempted regicide by orders of the Marquis of Pombal.
- 1762 – 1763 — Spanish invasion of Portugal stopped with the help of Great Britain.
- 1777 — Maria I of Portugal becomes Queen regnant. The King consort is her husband and uncle, Pedro III of Portugal. Pombal is dismissed.
- 1792 — João assumes royal responsibilities due to the declining mental health of his mother, Maria I of Portugal.
- 1799 — João officially becomes Prince regent

=== 19th century ===
- 1807 – Napoleon Bonaparte, Emperor of the French, invades Portugal and the Portuguese Royal Family is transferred to the colony of Brazil and the colony is elevated to the status of kingdom and center of the Portuguese Empire. Portugal changes the official name from Kingdom of Portugal and the Algarves to Kingdom of Portugal, Brazil and the Algarves.
- 1808 – Insurrection against Napoleon's general, Junot and landing of Arthur Wellesley (later Duke of Wellington) to defeat the French at the Battle of Vimeiro. Beginning of the Peninsular War. Subsequent French attack in 1810 led by Masséna repulsed at the Lines of Torres Vedras.
- 1816 – João VI becomes king. Portugal is governed by a Regency council headed by Marshal Beresford, head of the Portuguese army in the Peninsular War.
- 1820 – Insurrection against the British-led Regency begins in Porto on 24 August. The Regency's troops decline to act against their countrymen and on 15 September declare for King, Cortes and Constitution. A provisional government is established on 1 October to oversee elections to the Cortes.
- 1821 – The national assembly opens on 26 January and on 9 March adopts a liberal parliamentary constitution (ratified 1822), inspired by the recent liberal advances in Spain, notably the 1812 Constitution of Cadiz. Metropolitan Portugal demands the return of João VI to Lisbon. João VI advises his son, Pedro, to declare the independence of Brazil and become its emperor, to ensure its continued rule by the Bragança dynasty. João VI lands in Portugal on 4 July, but only after consenting to the restrictions on his power proposed by the Cortes and agreeing to accept the new constitution, to which he swears allegiance on 1 October. But his wife Queen Carlota Joaquina and younger son Dom Miguel refuse to do so and become the focus of a reactionary movement.
- 1822 – Brazil declares independence. Pedro becomes Emperor Pedro I of Brazil. Military coup against the parliamentarians. Fearing a move by France against democratic Portugal, or a civil war, Brigadier Saldanha, a grandson of the Marquis of Pombal, raises a small army and expels the ‘constitutional extremists’ from Lisbon. He proposes instead a compromise constitution in which the powers of the crown will be partially restored to the King. (This is the first of Saldanha's seven coups d'état in his career).
- 1823 – In May a 'Regency of Portugal' is established by the expelled traditionalists who had opposed the constitution at Valladolid, under the presidency of the Patriarch of Lisbon and becomes a centre for plotting to put Dom Miguel on the throne.
- 1824 – At the end of April Miguel attempts a coup d'état but is defeated with British aid and goes into exile in Vienna.
- 1826 – Death of João VI, 10 March. The country is split between radicals and absolutists. Emperor Pedro I of Brazil becomes king Pedro IV of Portugal but abdicates in favour of his daughter Maria II of Portugal, naming his sister as Regent and inviting all parties swear to accept a new constitution, drawn up by Pedro on 23 April and somewhat less liberal than that of 1820, based upon the Brazilian constitution. Pedro's constitution (the Charter of 1826) assigns authority to the crown to moderate between the legislative, executive and judicial powers of the state and proposes a House of Lords of 72 aristocrats and 19 bishops. Miguel (in Vienna) makes a show of agreement.
- 1827 – In July Pedro names his brother Dom Miguel as Lieutenant and Regent of the Kingdom. Miguel leaves Vienna and visits Paris and London on his way to Portugal.
- 1828 – Dom Miguel arrives in Lisbon in February and though he makes a show of abiding by the constitution, after various moves against the constitutional forces he usurps the throne and abolishes parliament and the constitution, re-instituting the mediaeval Cortes and claiming to be 'Absolute King' (proclaimed 4 July). Many of the liberal parliamentarians are imprisoned, executed or driven into exile. All Portuguese territories apart from Terceira in the Azores declare for Miguel, but he is recognized as King only by Mexico and the USA. Beginning of civil war, known as the Liberal Wars.
- 1831 – Emperor Pedro I of Brazil abdicates in favour of his son Pedro II of Brazil and sets out to regain Portugal for his daughter.
- 1832 – Pedro's expeditionary force of Portuguese exiles and foreign mercenaries gathers in Terceira, regains the Azores, then sails for Portugal. Pedro is supported by Britain and France and the Portuguese intelligentsia, including the politically ambitious soldiers Saldanha and Sá de Bandeira. 9 July: Pedro lands at Porto, where he is closely besieged by some 13,000 Miguelites across the river Douro. His defending force, the city garrison being commanded by Sá de Bandeira, includes an international brigade with a British contingent under Charles Shaw and Colonel George Lloyd Hodges. The city suffers cholera, starvation and bombardment.
- 1833 – Miguel's navy is defeated by Pedro's Admiral Charles Napier at the fourth Battle of Cape St Vincent. The Duke of Terceira defeats Miguel's army at Almada and occupies Lisbon.
- 1834
  - May 16, the Duke of Terceira wins the Battle of Asseiceira. Miguel capitulates at the Concession of Evoramonte on May 26. End of the civil war: Miguel is exiled to Genoa, where he renounces his capitulation. For many years he plots his return, but is never able to put it into effect. After two years of bitter and destructive war the country is once again bankrupt and beholden to foreign creditors, and the constitutional radicals turn their anger against the landowners and ecclesiastical institutions that had supported Miguel. The crown lands (a quarter of the national territory) are taken over by the state to help pay the national debt.
  - September 24, Death of Dom Pedro. Maria II of Portugal becomes queen in her own right. Dissolution of the monasteries – over 300 monastic orders are abolished – however the sale of church and crown lands does not revitalise Portugal in the way that had been anticipated.
- 1835 – Revolutionary fervour is rekindled by an urban uprising and a military coup d'état. The national Guard sides with the insurgents and approved the call for Sá da Bandeira to lead the nation and bring back the constitution of 1822. Queen Maria is forced to swear allegiance to the 1822 constitution but the moderate leader, Saldanha, reaches an accommodation with Sá da Bandeira and a modest programme of modernisation can begin.
- 1839 – An unsettled period of many short-lived governments ends temporarily with the stable coalition led by José Travassos Valdez, 1st Count of Bonfim, which remains in power for two years.
- 1843 – Queen Maria II marries Prince Ferdinand of Saxe-Coburg-Gotha, who rules with her as Fernando II, the thirtieth King of Portugal. He commissions the German architect Baron Eschwege to begin the building of the Pena Palace at Sintra.
- 1846 – Spring: A ‘peasants' revolt’ inaugurates the last phase of the Revolution, starting as an uprising of the peasants of the Minho, largely led by women (their movement is named after the semi-mythical ‘Maria da Fonte’) against land enclosures and new land taxes demanded by the Costa Cabral government to finance its grandiose public works. They make common cause with the clergy and call for the return of the exiled Miguel as their saviour. Martial law is declared but soldiers refuse to fire on their kin. Fall of the Costa Cabral government and substitution of a government of national reconciliation in Lisbon. Autumn: A revolutionary government is proclaimed in Oporto with Sá da Bandeira at its head. He opens negotiations with Britain, whence Costa Cabral has fled into exile, and settles terms for his return to take responsibility for the national debt. Civil war between the supporters of Queen Maria and the radical constitutionalists. The Conde do Bonfim, for the Porto junta, is defeated by Saldanha at the siege of Torres Vedras and exiled to Angola.
- 1847 – Convention of Gramido brings the civil war to an end. Return of the political exiles from Angola.
- 1848 – Costa Cabral returns as prime minister.
- 1851 – Another coup d'état by Saldanha. He ejects Costa Cabral, appoints himself prime minister and rules reasonably progressively from the house of lords for a full five-year term. Thus a proper parliamentary regime is finally established, with a two-party system and a bourgeois monarchy. Portugal enters its Age of Regeneration, with an old-fashioned cavalry officer in charge. The government embarks on an elaborate programme of public works to modernize the country, beginning with the establishment of a modern post office and a programme of road-building: in the entire country there is less than 200 km of all-weather road surface, and the government uses road taxes to finance 200 km of new road per year.
- 1853 – Pedro V becomes king.
- 1861 – Luís I becomes king.
- 1869 – The government of Sá da Bandeira formally abolishes slavery in all Portuguese territories.
- 1870 – A financial crisis in the wake of European recession brings the fall of the government and yet another coup d'état by the aged Duque de Saldanha.
- 1881 – Republican insurrection in Porto. It is violently put down by the authorities, who afterwards institute a tight press censorship. Opponents of the government are accused of anarchism and exiled to the colonies.
- 1889 – Carlos I becomes king.

=== 20th century ===
- 1906
  - João Franco is appointed as Prime Minister of Portugal.
  - Big strike of the typographers.
  - Foundation of the Escola Superior Colonial (Superior Colonial School)
- 1907
  - João Franco establishes a dictatorship within the framework of the monarchy.
  - Student's strike at the University of Coimbra.
- 1908
  - January 28, Failed Republican revolutionary attempt. The conspirators are arrested.
  - February 1, King Carlos I of Portugal and his son and heir, prince Luis Filipe, Duke of Braganza, are killed in the Regicide of Lisbon by Alfredo Luís da Costa and Manuel Buiça, republicans of the Carbonária (the Portuguese section of the Carbonari).
  - Manuel II, King Carlos youngest son, becomes king.
  - The Portuguese Republican Party manages to elect all its candidates in the local elections of Lisbon.
- 1909
  - King Manuel II of Portugal goes in a personal trip to Madrid, London and Paris.
  - The Portuguese Republican Party's Conference takes place in Setúbal, where the motion to accelerate the revolutionary movement to establish the Republic is approved.
  - In Lisbon a demonstration with more than 100,000 persons protests against the political and economical situation of the Monarchy.
- 1910
  - October 4, Beginning of the Republican Revolution.
  - 5 October, The last King of Portugal, Manuel II of Portugal, flees into exile. After Manuel, several lines of pretenders ensued.
  - 5 October, The Republic is officially proclaimed in Lisbon. End of the Monarchy.

== See also ==
- History of Portugal
- Timeline of Portuguese history
  - Third Dynasty: Habsburg (Spanish rule) (16th to 17th century)
  - First Republic (20th century)
