= Artur Ivens Ferraz =

Portuguese politician and military officer

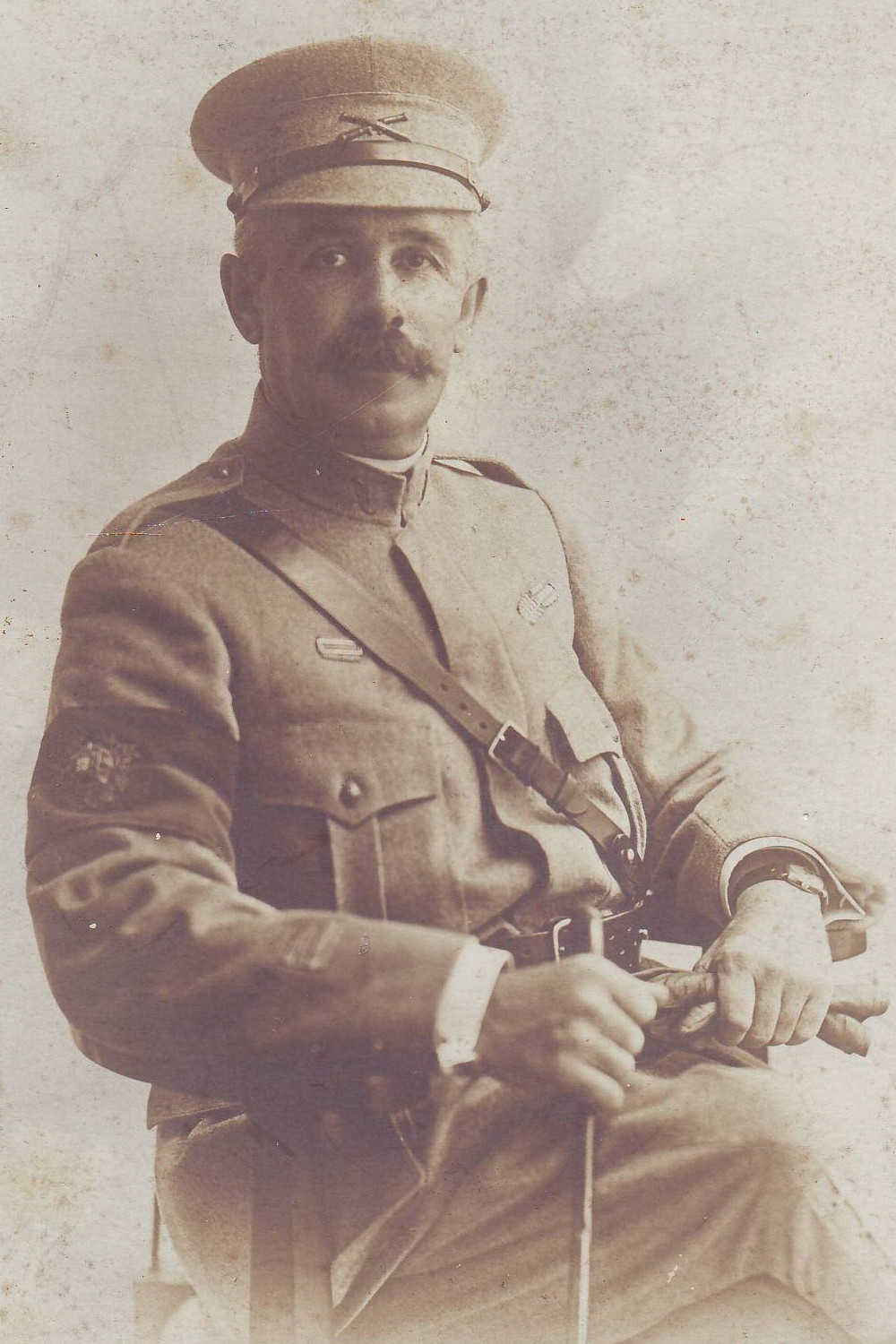
- Ferraz in 1923

Prime Minister of Portugal
- In office 8 July 1929 – 21 January 1930
- President: Óscar Carmona
- Preceded by: José Vicente de Freitas
- Succeeded by: Domingos Oliveira

Minister of Commerce and Communication of Portugal
- In office 26 August 1927 – 5 January 1928
- President: Óscar Carmona
- Preceded by: Júlio César de Carvalho Teixeira
- Succeeded by: Alfredo Machado e Costa

Minister of the Colonies of Portugal
- Interim; 28 November 1927 – 24 February 1928
- President: Óscar Carmona
- Prime Minister: Óscar Carmona
- Preceded by: João Belo
- Succeeded by: Agnelo Portela

Minister of Finance of Portugal
- Interim; 16 February – 7 April 1928
- President: Óscar Carmona
- Prime Minister: Óscar Carmona
- Preceded by: João José Sinel de Cordes
- Succeeded by: João José Sinel de Cordes

Minister of Foreign Affairs of Portugal
- Interim; 8 July – 27 July 1929
- President: Óscar Carmona
- Prime Minister: Himself
- Preceded by: Manuel Quintão Meireles
- Succeeded by: Henrique Trindade Coelho
- Interim; 16 August – 11 September 1929
- President: Óscar Carmona
- Prime Minister: Himself
- Preceded by: Henrique Trindade Coelho
- Succeeded by: Jaime da Fonseca Monteiro

Minister of the Interior of Portugal
- In office 8 July 1929 – 21 January 1930
- President: Óscar Carmona
- Prime Minister: Himself
- Preceded by: José Vicente de Freitas
- Succeeded by: António Lopes Mateus

Minister of Public Instruction of Portugal
- Interim; 14 November – 21 December 1929
- President: Óscar Carmona
- Prime Minister: Himself
- Preceded by: Eduardo da Costa Ferreira
- Succeeded by: Victor Hugo Duarte de Lemos

High Commissioner and Governor-General of Mozambique
- In office May – November 1926
- President: Bernardino Machado; José Mendes Cabeçadas; Manuel Gomes da Costa; Óscar Carmona
- Prime Minister: António Maria da Silva; José Mendes Cabeçadas; Manuel Gomes da Costa; Óscar Carmona
- Minister of the Colonies: Ernesto Vieira da Rocha; José Mendes Cabeçadas (as interim); Manuel Gomes da Costa (as interim); Armando da Gama Ochoa; João de Almeida; João Belo

Personal details
- Born: 1 December 1870 Lisbon, Portugal
- Died: 16 January 1933 (aged 62) Lisbon, Portugal
- Party: Independent

General Artur Ivens Ferraz (Portuguese pronunciation: [ɐɾˈtuɾ ˈajvɐ̃ʃ fɨˈʁaʃ]; 1 December 1870, in Lisbon – 16 January 1933, in Lisbon), was a Portuguese military officer and politician. He served in the Portuguese Expeditionary Force during the Portuguese participation in World War I, in France. He was later Governor-General of Portuguese Mozambique, and was Minister of Trade, Colonies and Finances. He also served as Prime Minister from 8 July 1929 to 21 January 1930. He later occupied the post of general administrator of the Army and head of the Armed Forces.

== Early life ==
Born in Lisbon in 1870, he was the son of engineer Ricardo Júlio Ferraz and his wife Catherine Prescott Hickling Ivens. He had five brothers and one sister; three of his brothers also went into the military.

He was educated at the Royal Military College from 1883 to 1888. He then attended the Escola Politécnica in Lisbon and the School of the Army, where he completed the Artillery course with a high mark in 1893.

== Military career ==
In 1900, he completed the Army Staff course with distinction. While still a lieutenant, he headed the Portuguese mission that witnessed the British army manoeuvres in 1904. Between 1904 and 1918, he was a professor at the School of the Army, where he taught artillery tactics. He also taught English at the Military College from 1905 to 1913.

In the First World War, Ivens Ferraz was appointed chief liaison officer of the Portuguese Expeditionary Corps (CEP) with the British army in France in 1917. Previously, he headed a military mission to the War Office at the outbreak of the war (1914) and held other senior positions in the CEP. According to British sources, he had perfect English and even looked like an Englishman.

From 1919 to 1922 he was military attaché in London. Between 1924 and 1926 he served as head of the office of the High Commissioner of Mozambique, Victor Hugo de Azevedo Coutinho, and from May to November 1926 as acting High Commissioner and Governor-General.

== Government ==
During the Military Dictatorship, in the government led by General Carmona, he served as Minister of Commerce and Communications (from August 1927 to January 1928), Minister of the Colonies (from January to February 1928) and interim Minister of Finance (from February to April 1928). In this latter capacity, he went to Geneva to negotiate a large foreign loan under the auspices of the League of Nations, but ultimately rejected the conditions attached to it, considered offensive to national sovereignty. On his return to Lisbon, he was received in triumph.

Promoted to General in 1928, Ivens Ferraz was appointed Prime Minister by then President Carmona on 8 July 1929, holding office until 21 January 1930. He also temporarily took over the ministries of Foreign Affairs, Internal Administration and Education. A conservative republican, he favoured a return to constitutional normality, although not immediate. His differences over the future of the regime with the Finance Minister, Salazar, who defended an authoritarian model, eventually led to the fall of the government.

After leaving office, he returned to his previous post as General Administrator of the Army and, in 1931, was appointed Chief of Staff of the Army, a position he held until his death in 1933. His memoirs of six months as head of government were published posthumously.

Political offices
Preceded by José Vicente de Freitas	Prime Minister of Portugal; 1929–1930	Succeeded by Domingos Oliveira
