= Manuel Quintão Meireles =

Portuguese Navy officer and politician

- Born: 14 December 1880; Freixo de Espada à Cinta, Portugal
- Died: 11 March 1962 (aged 81); Lisbon, Portugal
- Occupations: Portuguese Navy officer and a politician

Manuel Carlos Quintão Meireles (14 December 1880 – 11 March 1962) was a Portuguese Navy admiral and politician. He initially supported the Military Dictatorship, after the 28 May 1926 revolution, but later moved to the Democratic Opposition side. In 1951, he was the moderate candidate at the presidential elections against the regime candidate, General Francisco Craveiro Lopes, but he withdrew from the race after it was revealed that the election ballots were printed on special paper that would allow the police to easily identify votes cast for the Liberal candidate.
