= António Maria de Bettencourt Rodrigues =

Portuguese physician

Antonio Maria de Bettencourt Rodrigues
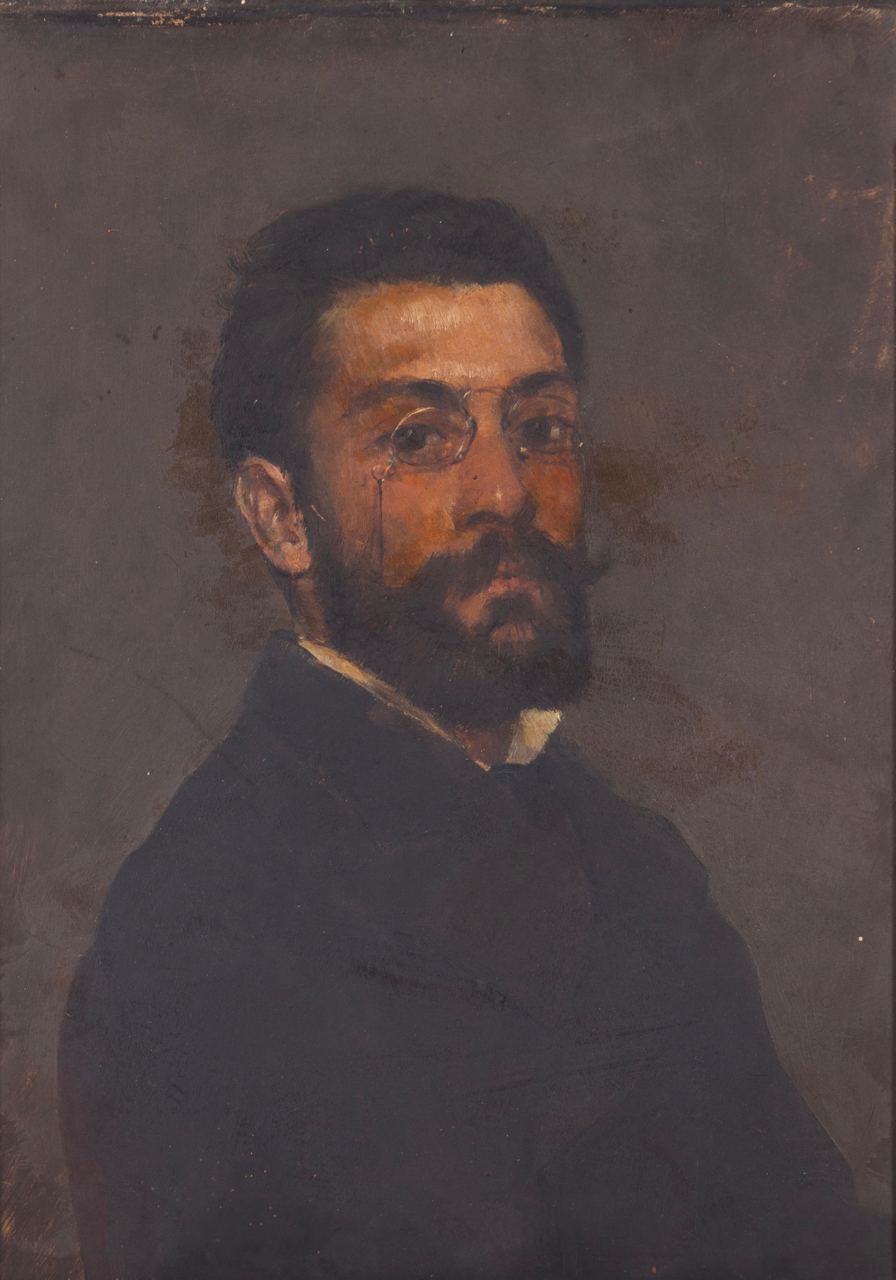
- Portrait of Rodrigues, by Columbano Bordalo Pinheiro

Personal details
- Born: 5 March 1854 São Nicolau, Portuguese Cape Verde, Portuguese Empire
- Died: 4 October 1933 (aged 79) Monte Estoril, Cascais, Portugal
- Occupation: Physician

Antonio Maria de Bettencourt Rodrigues (5 March 1854 – 4 October 1933) was a Portuguese diplomat, medical doctor and politician.

== Early life ==
Rodrigues was the youngest son of Judge José Júlio Rodrigues (Salvador do Mundo, Bardez, Goa, 6 May 1812 - Luanda), Goan Catholic, Bachelor of Law from the University of Coimbra, Delegate of the Regal Attorney in Funchal, Court of Appeal judge of Luanda and his wife (Funchal, Sé, 13 August 1842) Teresa Cristina de Sá e Bettencourt (Funchal, Sé -?).

== Career ==
A physician, Doctor of Medicine, Faculty of Medicine, University of Paris, Minister Plenipotentiary in Paris in 1913 and 1917–1918, senator for the Extremadura Electoral Circle in 1918, Minister of Foreign Affairs of the Governments of Óscar Carmona and José Vicente de Freitas 1926–1928, during the military dictatorship, and President of the Portuguese Delegation to the League of Nations.

On 5 October 1927, he was awarded the Grand Cross of the Military Order of Christ.

An important scientific work left by him was also published.
