= Timeline of Portuguese history (Second Dynasty) =

This is a historical timeline of Portugal's Second Dynasty.

== Second Dynasty: Aviz ==
=== 14th century ===
- 1385
  - April – João I of Portugal acclaimed king by the Portuguese; Castilians do not accept this claim.
  - August 14 – Battle of Aljubarrota: João I defeats the Castilians and secures the throne.
- 1386 - Treaty of Windsor, an alliance between England and Portugal.
- 1394 – Henry the Navigator, son of king João I of Portugal, is born.

=== 15th century ===
- 1415 – João I conquers the city of Ceuta in northern Africa.
- 1419 – Madeira Islands discovered by João Gonçalves Zarco and Tristão Vaz Teixeira.
- 1427 – Azores Islands discovered by Diogo Silves.
- 1433 – Duarte of Portugal becomes king.
- 1434 – Gil Eanes crosses the Bojador Cape: exploration of the African coast begins.
- 1438 – Afonso V of Portugal becomes king.
- 1444/1460 – discovery and settling of Cape Verde islands.
- 1481 – João II of Portugal becomes king.
- 1483 – João II executes Fernando, the third Duke of Braganza, and Diogo, the Duke of Viseu, putting an end to high nobility conspiracies.
- 1484 – Diogo Cão discovers the Congo River.
- 1491 – Bartolomeu Dias becomes the first European captain to cross the Cape of Good Hope.
- 1494 – The Treaty of Tordesillas signed between Spain and Portugal, dividing the colonisable world in two halves.
- 1495 – Manuel I of Portugal becomes king.
- 1498 – Vasco da Gama reaches India through navigation around Africa.

=== 16th century ===
- 1500
  - Easter Day – Pedro Álvares Cabral discovers the already inhabited Brazil.
  - Diogo Dias discovered an island they named after St Lawrence after the saint on whose feast day they had first sighted the island later known as Madagascar
  - Manuel I orders expulsion or conversion of the Portuguese Jews.
    - Gaspar Corte-Real made his first voyage to Newfoundland, formerly known as Terras Corte-Real.
- 1502 - Miguel Corte-Real set out for New England in search of his brother, Gaspar.
  - João da Nova discovered Ascension Island.
  - Fernão de Noronha discovers the islands of Fernando de Noronha, giving them their namesake.
- 1503 - On his return from the East, Estevão da Gama discovered Saint Helena Island.
- 1506 - Tristão da Cunha discovered the island that bears his name. Portuguese sailors landed on Madagascar.
- 1507 - Afonso de Albuquerque conquers Oman.
- 1509 - The Gulf of Bengal crossed by Diogo Lopes Sequeira. On the crossing he also reached Malacca.
- 1510 - Conquest of Goa by Afonso de Albuquerque.
- 1511 - Conquest of Malacca by Afonso de Albuquerque.
- 1512 - António de Abreu discovered Timor island and reached Banda Islands, Ambon Island and Seram. Francisco Serrão reached the Moluccas.
- 1513 - The first trading ship to touch the coasts of China, under Jorge Álvares and Rafael Perestrello later in the same year.
- 1515 - Afonso de Albuquerque captures the Kingdom of Hormuz, reducing it to a protectorate.
- 1517 - Fernão Pires de Andrade and Tomé Pires were chosen by Manuel I of Portugal to sail to China to formally open relations between the Portuguese Empire and the Ming Dynasty during the reign of the Zhengde Emperor.
- 1521 – João III of Portugal becomes king.
  - António Correia captures Bahrain, which is under Portuguese rule until 1602.
- 1526 - Jorge de Meneses reaches New Guinea for the first time.
- 1542 – Portuguese explorers Fernão Mendes Pinto, Francisco Zeimoto and António Mota are the first Europeans to land in Japan.
- 1557- Macau given to Portugal by the Emperor of China as a reward for services rendered against the pirates who infested the South China Sea.
  - Sebastião of Portugal becomes king.
- 1568 – King Sebastião of Portugal comes of age and takes control of the government.
- 1569
  - Plague epidemic in Portugal. 60,000 people die in Lisbon alone.
  - Nagasaki, Japan, is open to Portuguese traders.
- 1570
  - Luís de Camões returns to Lisbon from the Orient.
  - Goa, in Portuguese India, is attacked by a coalition of Indian forces, but these are defeated by Portuguese Vice-Roy Luís de Ataíde, Count of Atouguia.
- 1578
  - Portuguese troops were utterly defeated in Africa, in the Battle of Alcácer Quibir; King Sebastião disappears in the battle never to be seen again.
  - Cardinal Henrique I of Portugal becomes king.
- 1579 - Cortes in Lisbon.
- 1580
  - Cortes in Almeirim.
  - King Cardinal Henrique I of Portugal dies.
  - The Portuguese Succession Crisis of 1580 begins, paving the way for the Iberian Union.

== See also ==
- History of Portugal
- Timeline of Portuguese history
  - First Dynasty: Burgundy (12th to 14th century)
  - Third Dynasty: Habsburg (Spanish rule) (16th to 17th century)
