= José Mendes Cabeçadas =

Portuguese president and politician

His Excellency Vice-admiral José Mendes Cabeçadas OTE ComA MPCE
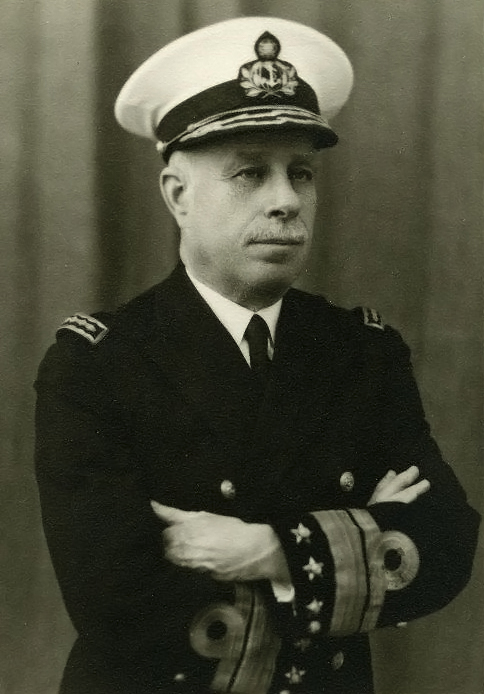
- Cabeçadas, c. 1940-50

President of Portugal
- In office 31 May 1926 – 17 June 1926
- Prime Minister: Himself
- Preceded by: Bernardino Machado
- Succeeded by: Manuel Gomes da Costa

Prime Minister of Portugal
- In office 31 May 1926 – 17 June 1926
- President: Himself
- Preceded by: António Maria da Silva
- Succeeded by: Manuel Gomes da Costa

President of the National Salvation Junta
- In office 29 May 1926 – 31 May 1926
- President: Bernardino Machado
- Preceded by: António Maria da Silva (Prime Minister)
- Succeeded by: Himself (Prime Minister)

Minister of the Interior of Portugal
- Interim; 30 May – 1 June 1926
- President: Himself
- Prime Minister: Himself
- Preceded by: Public Salvation Junta
- Succeeded by: Armando da Gama Ochoa (not appointed)
- Interim; 3 June – 17 June 1926
- President: Himself
- Prime Minister: Himself
- Preceded by: Armando da Gama Ochoa (not appointed)
- Succeeded by: Manuel Gomes da Costa

Minister of Commerce and Communications of Portugal
- In office 30 May – 1 June 1926
- President: Himself
- Prime Minister: Himself
- Preceded by: Public Salvation Junta
- Succeeded by: Ezequiel de Campos

Minister of Finance of Portugal
- In office 30 May – 1 June 1926
- President: Himself
- Prime Minister: Himself
- Preceded by: Public Salvation Junta
- Succeeded by: António de Oliveira Salazar

Minister of Agriculture of Portugal
- Interim; 30 May – 1 June 1926
- President: Himself
- Prime Minister: Himself
- Preceded by: Public Salvation Junta
- Succeeded by: Manuel Gomes da Costa (designate)

Minister of the Colonies of Portugal
- Interim; 30 May – 1 June 1926
- President: Himself
- Prime Minister: Himself
- Preceded by: Public Salvation Junta
- Succeeded by: Manuel Gomes da Costa (designate)

Minister of Public Instruction of Portugal
- Interim; 30 May – 1 June 1926
- President: Himself
- Prime Minister: Himself
- Preceded by: Public Salvation Junta
- Succeeded by: Armando da Gama Ochoa

Minister of Foreign Affairs of Portugal
- Interim; 30 May – 1 June 1926
- President: Himself
- Preceded by: Public Salvation Junta
- Succeeded by: Armando da Gama Ochoa

Minister of War of Portugal
- In office 30 May – 1 June 1926
- President: Himself
- Prime Minister: Himself
- Preceded by: Public Salvation Junta
- Succeeded by: Manuel Gomes da Costa (as interim)

Minister of Justice of Portugal
- In office 30 May – 3 June 1926
- President: Himself
- Prime Minister: Himself
- Preceded by: Public Salvation Junta
- Succeeded by: Manuel Rodrigues Júnior

Minister of the Navy of Portugal
- In office 30 May – 3 June 1926
- President: Himself
- Prime Minister: Himself
- Preceded by: Public Salvation Junta
- Succeeded by: Jaime Afreixo

Personal details
- Born: José Mendes Cabeçadas Júnior; 19 August 1883 Loulé, Portugal
- Died: 11 June 1965 (aged 81) Lisbon, Portugal
- Party: Independent
- Spouse(s): Maria das Dores Vieira (m. 1911–1949); her death
- Children: 4
- Occupation: Naval officer (Vice-admiral)

Military service
- Allegiance: (Kingdom of Portugal) Portugal
- Branch/service: Portuguese Navy

José Mendes Cabeçadas Júnior, OTE, ComA, MPCE (Portuguese pronunciation: [ʒuˈzɛ ˈmẽdɨʃ kɐβɨˈsaðɐʃ]), commonly known as Mendes Cabeçadas (19 August 1883 – 11 June 1965), was a Portuguese Navy officer, Freemason and republican, having a major role in the preparation of the revolutionary movements that created and ended the Portuguese First Republic: the 5 October revolution in 1910 and the 28 May coup d'état of 1926. In the outcome he became the minister of finance for one day only on 30 May 1926, then becoming interim minister for foreign affairs for two days between 30 May and 1 June, after which he again became the minister for finance on the same day. He served as the president of Portugal (the first of the Military dictatorship) and prime minister for a brief period of time.

== Career ==
Mendes Cabeçadas was one of those responsible for the revolt on board the ship Adamastor, during the Republican Revolution of 1910. However he soon became disappointed with the regime he had helped to create. In 1926 he led the revolution against the First Republic in Lisbon after Gomes da Costa had started it in Braga. Prime Minister António Maria da Silva resigned and, just days later (31 May), President Bernardino Machado named him prime minister. On the same day the President also resigned and Mendes Cabeçadas assumed the role of President of the Republic.

As a revolutionary with moderate tendencies, Mendes Cabeçadas thought it possible to form a government that wouldn't question the constitutional regime, but with no influence on the Democratic Party. However the other revolutionaries (among them Gomes da Costa and Óscar Carmona) judged him as incapable and in a meeting in Sacavém on 17 June 1926, Mendes Cabeçadas was forced to renounce the posts of president of the republic and president of the Council of Ministers (prime minister) in favour of Gomes da Costa.

Mendes Cabeçadas joined the opposition to the regime for a third time, involving himself in several revolutionary attempts and subscribed to many manifestos against the dictatorship, until his death in 1965 during the period known as the Estado Novo (New State), headed by António de Oliveira Salazar.

== Personal life ==
Mendes Cabeçadas married Maria das Dores Formosinho Vieira (Silves, 6 January 1880 – 22 December 1949) in Santa Isabel, Lisbon, in March 1911. The couple had four daughters.

== See also ==
- List of presidents of Portugal
- List of prime ministers of Portugal
- First Portuguese Republic
- Ditadura Nacional
- Estado Novo (Portugal)
- History of Portugal
- Timeline of Portuguese history
- Politics of Portugal

Preceded by Bernardino Machado	President of Portugal; 1926	Succeeded by Manuel Gomes da Costa
Preceded by António Maria da Silva	Prime Minister of Portugal; 1926	Succeeded by Manuel Gomes da Costa
