= Domingos Oliveira =

Portuguese general and politician

General Domingos Oliveira GCTE ComA GOA GCA
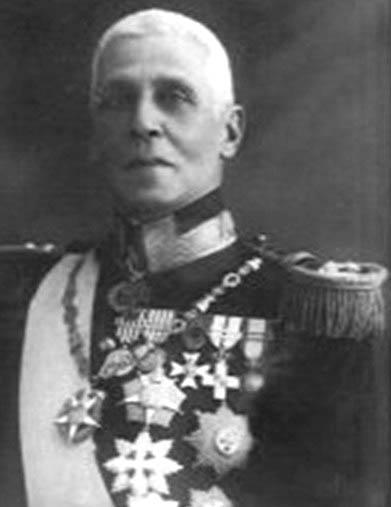

Prime Minister of Portugal
- In office 21 January 1930 – 5 July 1932
- President: Óscar Carmona
- Preceded by: Artur Ivens Ferraz
- Succeeded by: António de Oliveira Salazar

Minister of Justice of Portugal
- Interim; 23 January – 26 January 1931
- President: Óscar Carmona
- Prime Minister: Himself
- Preceded by: Luís Maria Lopes da Fonseca
- Succeeded by: José de Almeida Eusébio

Personal details
- Born: 31 July 1873 Lisbon, Portugal
- Died: 24 December 1957 (aged 84) Lisbon, Portugal
- Party: National Union

Military service
- Allegiance: Kingdom of Portugal; First Portuguese Republic; Ditadura Nacional
- Branch/service: (Kingdom of Portugal) (Portugal) Portuguese Army
- Years of service: 1910–1931
- Rank: General

Domingos Augusto Alves da Costa Oliveira GCTE (Portuguese pronunciation: [duˈmĩɡuʒ ðɐ ˈkɔʃtɐ ɔliˈvɐjɾɐ]; 31 July 1873 – 24 December 1957) was a Portuguese general and politician.

== Career ==
He was nominated, on 21 January 1930, Prime Minister of Portugal (President of the Council of Ministers) during the period of the Ditadura Nacional (National Dictatorship) that preceded the Estado Novo (New State). A conservative, he opposed all the attempts to restore democracy, like the failed military uprising of April and May 1931 in Madeira and the Azores Islands. The popularity and political role demonstrated by the Finance Minister, António de Oliveira Salazar, led him to resign on 25 June 1932, to be replaced by Salazar, who would retain the post for the following 36 years.

He was awarded the Grand Cross of the Military Order of the Tower and Sword and the Grand Cross of the Military Order of Aviz in 1931.

Political offices
Preceded by Artur Ivens Ferraz	Prime Minister of Portugal; 1930–1932	Succeeded by António de Oliveira Salazar
