= Manuel Gomes da Costa =

Portuguese president and politician

His Excellency Marshal Manuel Gomes da Costa GOA GOTE GCA
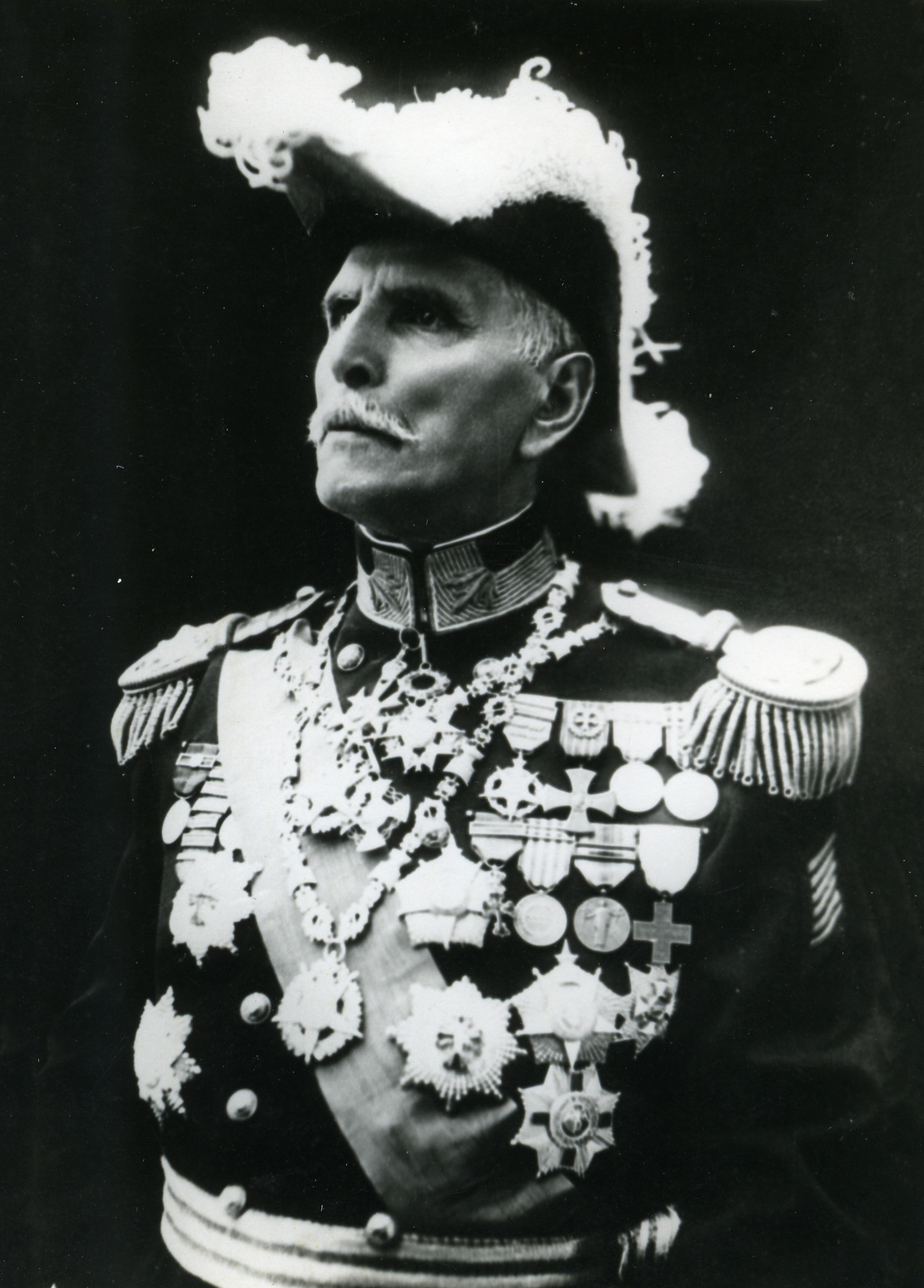
- Official portrait, 1918

President of Portugal
- In office 17 June 1926 – 9 July 1926
- Prime Minister: Himself
- Preceded by: José Mendes Cabeçadas
- Succeeded by: Óscar Carmona

Prime Minister of Portugal
- In office 17 June 1926 – 9 July 1926
- President: Himself
- Preceded by: José Mendes Cabeçadas
- Succeeded by: Óscar Carmona

Minister of Agriculture of Portugal
- Designate
- In office 1 June – 3 June 1926
- President: José Mendes Cabeçadas
- Prime Minister: José Mendes Cabeçadas
- Preceded by: José Mendes Cabeçadas
- Succeeded by: Ezequiel de Campos (designate)

Minister of the Colonies of Portugal
- Interim; 1 June – 19 June 1926
- President: José Mendes Cabeçadas
- Prime Minister: José Mendes Cabeçadas
- Preceded by: José Mendes Cabeçadas
- Succeeded by: Armando da Gama Ochoa

Minister of War of Portugal
- In office 1 June – 9 July 1926
- President: Himself
- Prime Minister: Himself
- Preceded by: José Mendes Cabeçadas
- Succeeded by: Óscar Carmona

Minister of the Interior of Portugal
- In office 6 July – 9 July 1926
- President: Himself
- Prime Minister: Himself
- Preceded by: António Claro
- Succeeded by: Felisberto Pedrosa
- Interim; 17 June – 18 June 1926
- President: Himself
- Prime Minister: Himself
- Preceded by: José Mendes Cabeçadas
- Succeeded by: António Claro

Personal details
- Born: Manuel de Oliveira Gomes da Costa; 14 January 1863 Lisbon, Portugal
- Died: 17 December 1929 (aged 66) Lisbon, Portugal
- Party: Independent
- Spouse: Henriqueta Júlia de Mira Godinho
- Relations: Pedro Francisco Massano de Amorim (son-in-law)
- Children: 3
- Parent(s): Carlos Dias da Costa (father); Madelena de Oliveira (mother)
- Occupation: Military officer (General, posthumously Marshal)

Military service
- Allegiance: Kingdom of Portugal; First Portuguese Republic; Ditadura Nacional
- Branch/service: (Kingdom of Portugal) (Portugal) Portuguese Army
- Years of service: 1873–1927
- Rank: General, posthumously Marshal

Manuel de Oliveira Gomes da Costa (Note: Portuguese pronunciation: [mɐnuˈɛl ˈɣomɨʒ ðɐ ˈkɔʃtɐ]) GOA, GOTE, GCA (14 January 1863 – 17 December 1929) was a Portuguese army officer and politician who served as president of Portugal in 1926. He was the second president of the Ditadura Nacional.

Gomes da Costa had a distinguished military career in the country's colonies, from 1893 to 1915, in India, Mozambique, Angola, and São Tomé, having served under the command of Mouzinho de Albuquerque. After World War I, in which he rose to greater prominence in the command of the 1st Division of the Portuguese Expeditionary Corps, he became actively engaged in politics, in staunch opposition to the dominant Democratic Party.

In 1926, he was involved in the military and political movement that resulted in the 28 May 1926 coup d'état that inaugurated a new conservative, authoritarian regime. Following the military coup, Gomes da Costa deposed moderate José Mendes Cabeçadas, who had received executive and presidential power from the removed Prime Minister António Maria da Silva and President Bernardino Machado, briefly holding the headship of government and of state in the summer of that year, until he was himself removed by another coup, to be replaced by Óscar Carmona.

== Early life ==
Gomes da Costa was born to Carlos Dias da Costa and Madalena de Oliveira; he grew up with two younger siblings, Lucrécia and Amália. He began his military career at the Colégio Militar at age 10.

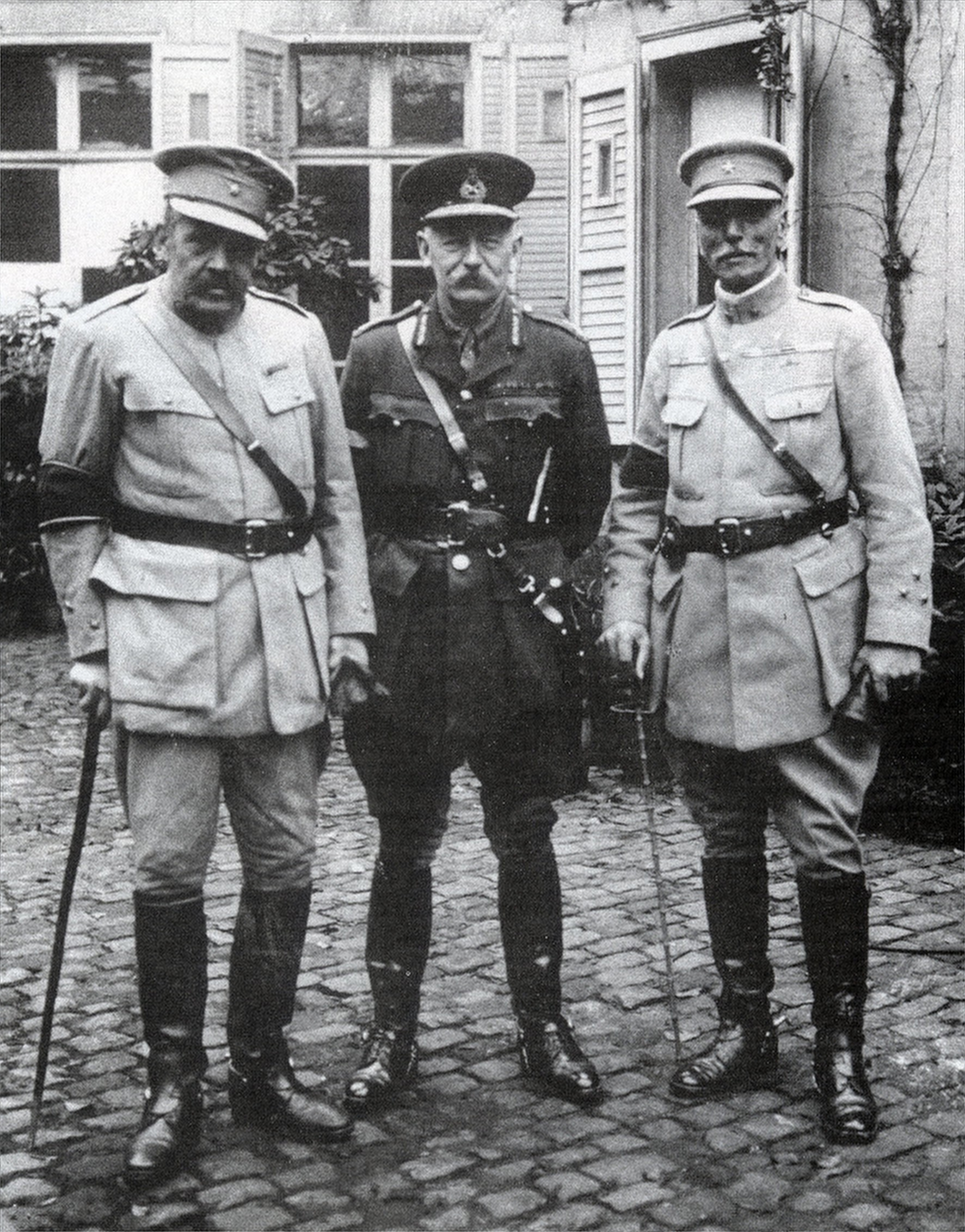
Generals Tamagnini and Gomes da Costa, together with General Haking.

== Military career ==
As a soldier, he stood out in colonial campaigns in the African and Indian colonies. After Portugal had entered the First World War (See: Portugal in the Great War) on the Allied side in early 1917, he commanded the Second Division of the Portuguese Expeditionary Corps. During the Battle of the Lys on 9 April 1918, the CEP lost 400 dead and around 6,500 prisoners, a third of its forces in the front line. Gomes da Costa's division was hit particularly hard and was all but wiped out.

For his command in the war, he was made a general and a Grand Officer of the Military Order of Avis. Two years later, on 5 October 1921, he received the Grand Cross of the Military Order of Avis.

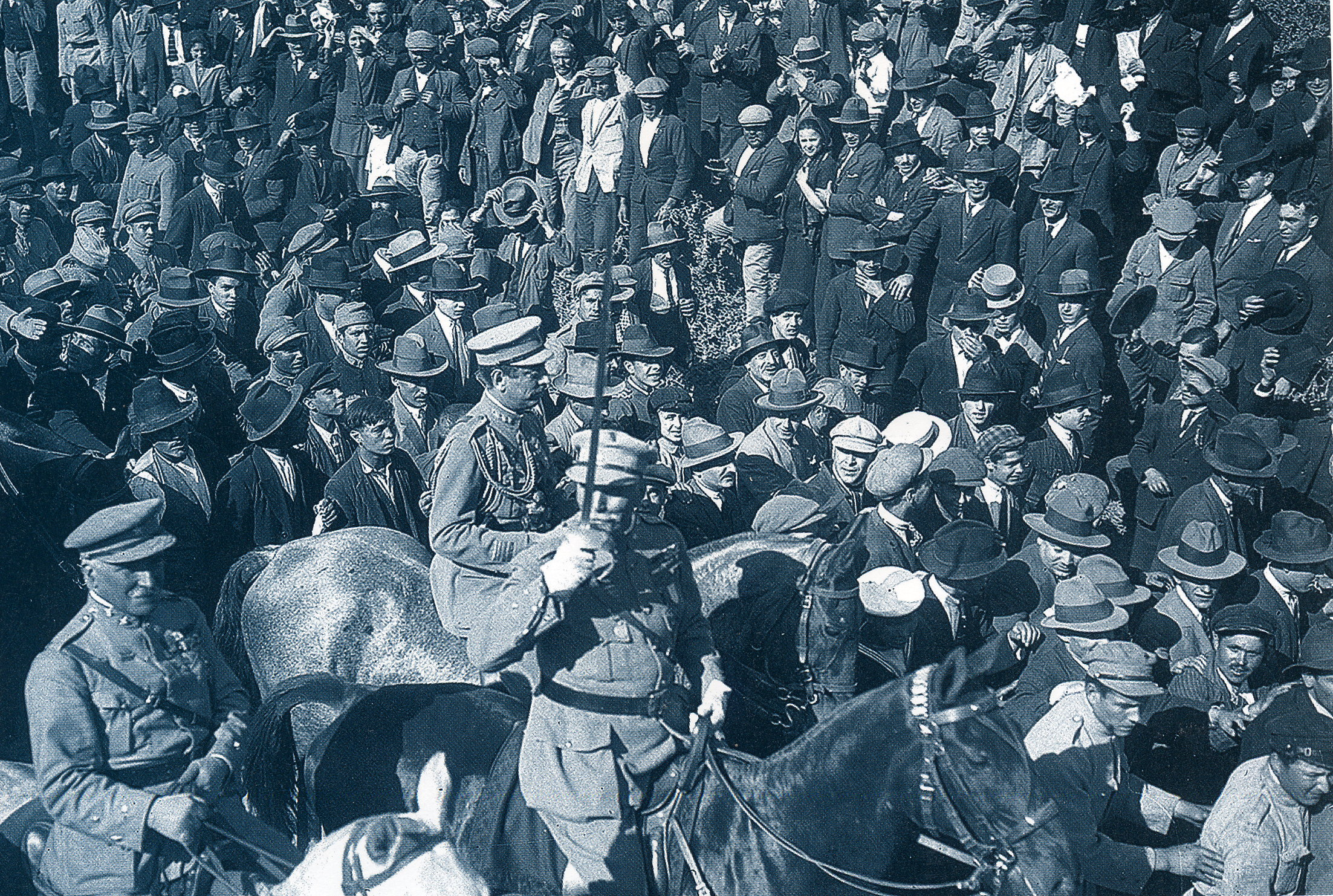
Gomes da Costa and his troops march victorious into Lisbon on 6 June 1926.

== 1926 coup ==
A convinced monarchist, Gomes da Costa had consorted with people of various political convictions. That, and his reputation as a soldier, led to his choice by right-wing revolutionaries to lead the 28 May 1926 coup d'état in Braga that overthrew the Portuguese First Republic, after General Alves Roçadas, their original choice, had fallen fatally ill.

After the success of the revolution, he did not assume power at first, entrusting the posts of President of the Republic and President of the Council of Ministers (Prime Minister) to José Mendes Cabeçadas, the leader of the revolution in Lisbon. Soon, the coup leaders disliked the attitude of Mendes Cabeçadas, a choice of the previous president Bernardino Machado and still sympathetic towards the old republic. He was replaced by Gomes da Costa in both posts in a meeting in Sacavém on 17 June 1926. The new government was the first to include the later prime minister and dictator of Portugal, Antonio de Oliveira Salazar, as finance minister.

== Overthrow and exile ==
Gomes da Costa's government lasted about as long as Cabeçadas', because it was overthrown by a new coup on 9 July the same year. This attempt was initiated by João José Sinel de Cordes and Óscar Carmona, after Gomes da Costa attempted to have Carmona removed as minister for foreign affairs. Although more conservative than Cabeçadas, Gomes da Costa had no desire to institute a long-term military regime, which brought him into conflict with Carmona and others in the most conservative and authoritarian faction of the military leadership.

Carmona succeeded Gomes da Costa as President of the Republic and of the Council of Ministers under the pretext that Gomes da Costa was "unfit for office." Gomes da Costa was exiled to the Azores Islands, but also promoted to Marshal of the Portuguese Army. In September 1927, he returned to mainland Portugal, already very ill; he died a few months later.

== Personal life ==
On 15 May 1885 in Penamacor, Gomes da Costa married Henriqueta Júlia de Mira Godinho (Lagos, Santa Maria, 1863–1936), by whom he had three children. Gomes da Costa was the father-in-law of Pedro Francisco Massano de Amorim, Governor of Gaza, Angola, Mozambique and India.

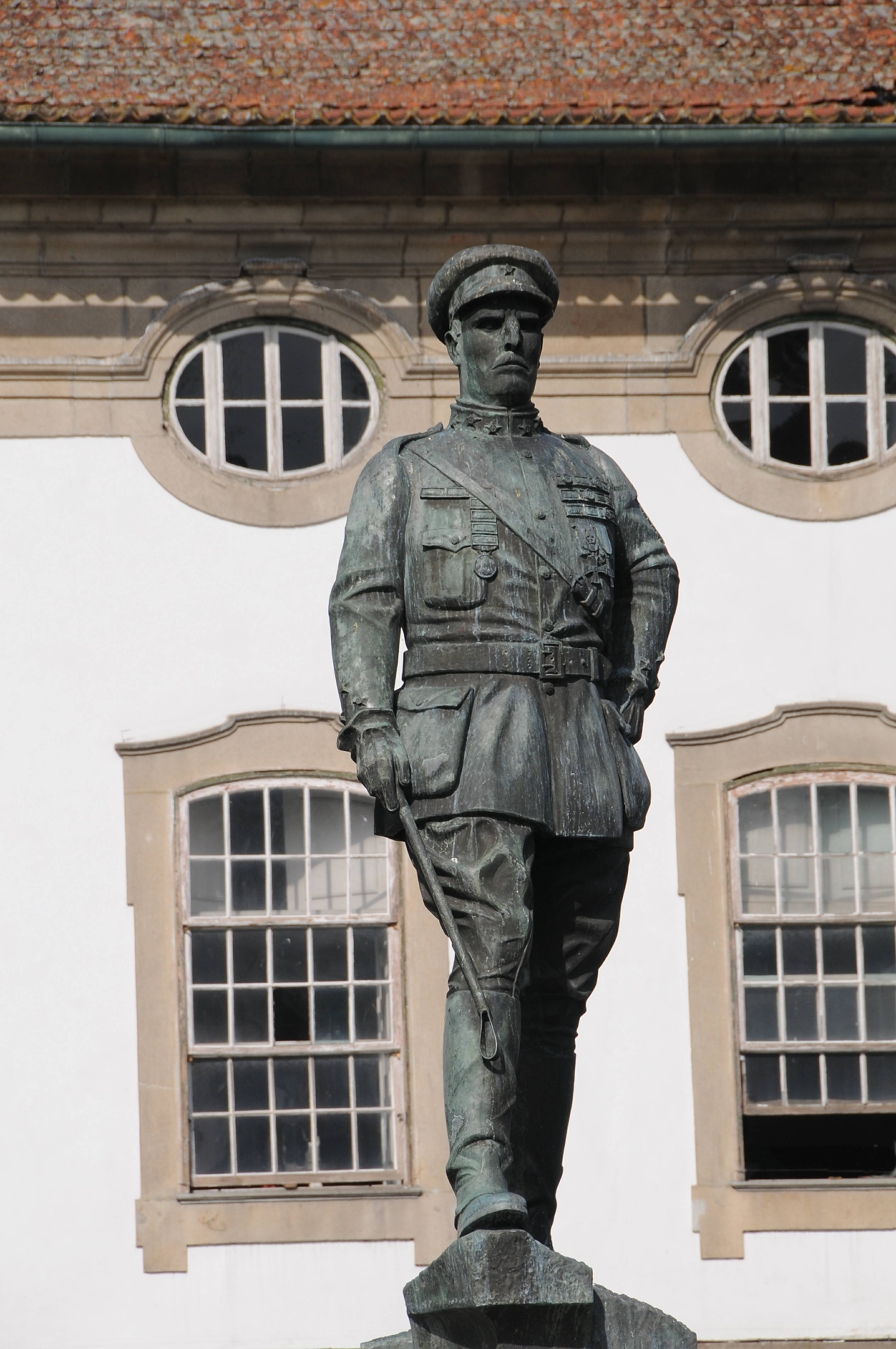
Statue in Braga

== Honours ==
- Grand Officer of the Order of Aviz, Portugal (15 February 1919)
- Grand Officer of the Order of the Tower and of the Sword, of Valour, Loyalty and Merit, Portugal (14 September 1920)
- Grand Cross of the Order of Aviz, Portugal (5 October 1921)

== See also ==
- Ditadura Nacional
- Estado Novo (Portugal)
- History of Portugal
- Politics of Portugal
- Timeline of Portuguese history
- List of presidents of Portugal
- List of prime ministers of Portugal

== Notes ==
Political offices
Preceded by José Mendes Cabeçadas	President and Prime Minister of Portugal; 1926	Succeeded by António Óscar Carmona
