= João José Sinel de Cordes =

Portuguese Army general

João José Sinel de Cordes (18 August 1867, in Barcarena (Oeiras) – 29 January 1930, in Lisbon) was a Portuguese general and politician.

A confidant of Sidónio Pais, he became the chief of the General Staff of the Portuguese Expeditionary Corps in France on 1 March 1918.

He participated in the 28 May 1926 coup d'état, together with Generals Manuel Gomes da Costa, Alves Roçadas and Óscar Carmona, thus creating the Ditadura Nacional. After Gomes da Costa's overthrow and exile, he became Minister of Finance on three occasions (9 July 1926, 19 December 1927, and 7 April 1928).
