= Ditadura Nacional =

1926–1933 government of Portugal

Portuguese Republic República Portuguesa (Portuguese)
- 1926–1933
- Flag Coat of arms
- Anthem: A Portuguesa (Portuguese) "The Portuguese"
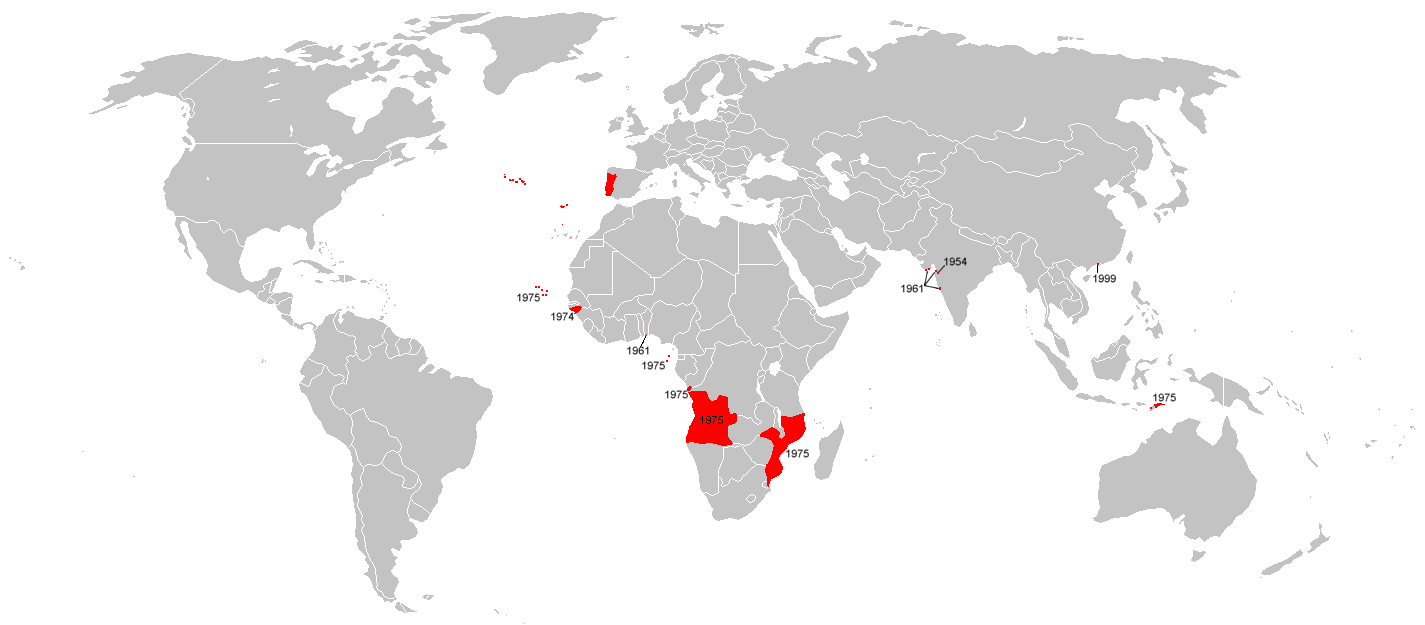
- The Portuguese Empire during the 20th century
- Capital: Lisbon
- Common languages: Portuguese
- Demonym: Portuguese
- Government: Unitary parliamentary republic under a military dictatorship
- President
  - 1926 (May–June): José Mendes Cabeçadas
  - 1926 (June–July): Manuel Gomes da Costa
  - 1926–1933: Óscar Carmona
- Prime Minister
  - 1926 (May–June): José Mendes Cabeçadas
  - 1926 (June–July): Manuel Gomes da Costa
  - 1926–1928: Óscar Carmona
  - 1928–1929: José Vicente de Freitas
  - 1929–1930: Artur Ivens Ferraz
  - 1930–1932: Domingos Oliveira
  - 1932–1933: António de Oliveira Salazar
- Historical era: Interwar period
  - Established: 29 May 1926
  - Disestablished: 19 March 1933
- Currency: Escudo
Preceded by	Succeeded by
First Portuguese Republic	Estado Novo (Portugal)

The Ditadura Nacional (Portuguese pronunciation: [ditɐˈðuɾɐ nɐsiuˈnal], National Dictatorship) was the regime that governed Portugal from the end of the First Portuguese Republic with the 28 May 1926 coup d'état, until the adoption of a new constitution in 1933 that ushered in the so-called Estado Novo. The term Ditadura Militar is also used by some to describe the first stages of the dictatorship, while other authors use it for the entire period.

The Ditadura Nacional and Estado Novo together constitute the historiographical period known as the Second Portuguese Republic, which lasted until 25 April 1974.

== Ditadura Militar, 1926–1928 ==
The military easily seized power in a 28 May coup. Soon afterward, the new regime dissolved parliament, banned all political parties and instituted censorship. This process was plagued by instability as hardline military officers purged liberals and democrats from the institutions of the Republic. During this time no one clear leader emerged, as the dictatorship was led by a coalition of lower-rank military officers, some of whom were Integralists.

After the republican Prime Minister and President resigned on 30 May, naval officer José Mendes Cabeçadas Júnior assumed both posts, but after conflicts with other coup leaders, he was forced to resign on 17 June. He was replaced by General Gomes da Costa, the leader of the 28 May coup, who became Prime Minister as well as President. Gomes da Costa was not devoted to the establishment of a permanent military dictatorship, and as a result he was forced out on 9 July in a coup led by the unshakably authoritarian General António Óscar de Fragoso Carmona who assumed both of the highest offices of the state and seized dictatorial powers. Carmona continued as Prime Minister until 18 April 1928 but retained the post of President of the Republic until his death on 18 April 1951.

In 1927 there were several failed coup attempts from both left- and right-wing movements. On 12 August 1927 junior officers forced their way into a cabinet meeting and started shooting. The Carmona government regained control of the government and imposed stronger military discipline. However, the attackers were not severely punished and were sent to posts in Portuguese Angola.

== Ditadura Nacional, 1928–1933 ==
In February 1928, the Propaganda Commission of the Dictatorship (Portuguese: Comissão de Propaganda da Ditadura) was created. The Police of Information of Porto and Lisbon were merged on 17 March. Carmona organized a Presidential election on 25 March 1928, in which he was the only candidate. He was duly "elected" for a five-year term as president. On 18 April he appointed José Vicente de Freitas as the new Prime Minister. Antonio de Oliveira Salazar was appointed Minister of Finance for the second time on 26 April. The new government came to an agreement with the Catholic Church, known as the Acordo Missionário (Missionary Agreement), giving the church special status in Portugal's colonies. The government also closed the main offices of the Portuguese Communist Party, which was reorganised the following year under Bento Gonçalves, with the creation of a net of clandestine cells to avoid the wave of detentions, reflecting the party's new illegal status. Later that year there was another failed Republican revolutionary attempt against the government.

The conflicts between the military officers and the National Catholic wing represented by Salazar increased to a point where the entire Freitas government resigned on 8 July 1929, with only Salazar keeping his ministerial post in the new cabinet of Artur Ivens Ferraz. Salazar's influence began to grow at the expense of military officers who gradually lost their political power, with Roman Catholic religious institutes again permitted in Portugal. On 21 January 1930, after a conflict with Salazar, Ferraz was replaced by General Domingos Oliveira, who allowed Salazar to play an ever increasing role in the nation's finances and politics. The Acto Colonial (Colonial Act) was published, defining the status of Portuguese colonies (Portuguese Angola, Cabinda, Portuguese Cape Verde, Portuguese Guinea, Portuguese São Tomé and Príncipe, Portuguese Mozambique, Portuguese India, Portuguese Timor and Portuguese Macau), and the fundamental principles of the new regime were presented by Salazar on the 4th anniversary of the May 28 Revolution.

By 1930 the military dictatorship had stabilized Portugal and the national leadership and state functionaries began to think about the future. The overarching question was "In what form was the dictatorship to continue?". The answer was provided by Salazar, who became Prime Minister on 5 July 1932 and in 1933 reorganized the regime as the Estado Novo. A new Constitution was approved in a referendum, defining Portugal as a single-party corporative republic and multi-continental country (in Europe, Africa, Asia and Oceania). The single party was the National Union (União Nacional) and a new labour code, the Estatuto do Trabalho Nacional (Code of National Labour), prohibited all free trade unions. Salazar's new regime institutionalized the system of censorship, and also created a political police force, the PVDE (Polícia de Vigilância e de Defesa do Estado; State Defense and Vigilance Police).

== Opposition ==
After 28 May 1926, there were four coup attempts against the Ditadura Nacional by Republican forces. On 3 February 1927, there was a large revolt that started in Porto, involving military and civil forces from the North, Coimbra, Évora, Algarve, and would end four days later on 7 February. On that same day, a coup attempt started in Lisbon, led by Mendes dos Reis, Agatão Lança, Câmara Lente, and Filipe Mendes, with navy, GNR, and civil forces, as well as the decaying NRP Carvalho Araújo and Canhoeira Ibo. The government forces in Lisbon greatly outnumbered the rebel forces, and were supported by some units that had already reached the capital after putting down the coup attempt in Porto and this second coup attempt ended at 7:30 p.m. on 9 February 1927. About 90 people died, 400 people were wounded and 700 buildings were damaged. Over a thousand people were exiled after these two revolts and from then on, the Republican rebels mostly organised in exile, through an association known as the Liga de Paris.

On 20 July 1928, a coup attempt was planned by the Liga de Paris, Major Sarmento Beires, and military leaders of the Portuguese mainland interior, which were supported by various syndicalists (namely railroad syndicalist workers). But the negotiations were hard and the government's forces learned about the plot and preemptively bombed São Jorge Castle, where the rebels were located. This caused the rebel forces within Castelo de São Jorge to start the plot, hours before the provincial rebel forces arrived in Lisbon. The rebel forces in Lisbon surrendered on the morning of 21 July 1928 and the forces outside the capital at 22 July the latest. About 1100 military members and 200 civilians were imprisoned, many of which were later exiled.

Between 4 April and 2 May 1931, there was an uprising which started in Madeira, and spread to the Azores and Guinea. It was badly prepared and received little support from mainland Portugal, so it failed.

On 26 August 1931, the Ditadura Nacional would see its last coup attempt, this time with the support of the Spanish Republic. It was led by Hélder Ribeiro, Utra Machado, Jaime Batista, Dias Antunes, Sarmento Beires. Yet, again due to bad planning, the hostilities would begin at 26 August at 6:45 a.m., while a significant amount of rebel forces was still unprepared, - forces in the North, Tomar, Abrantes, Santarém, and Castelo Branco are still being armed by the Spanish forces when the coup attempt begins. The coup would fail before 27 August, with 40 dead and 300 wounded. About 300 civilians and 100 military rebels are deported.
