= 28 May 1926 coup d'état =

Military overthrow of the First Portuguese Republic, establishing the Estado Novo regime

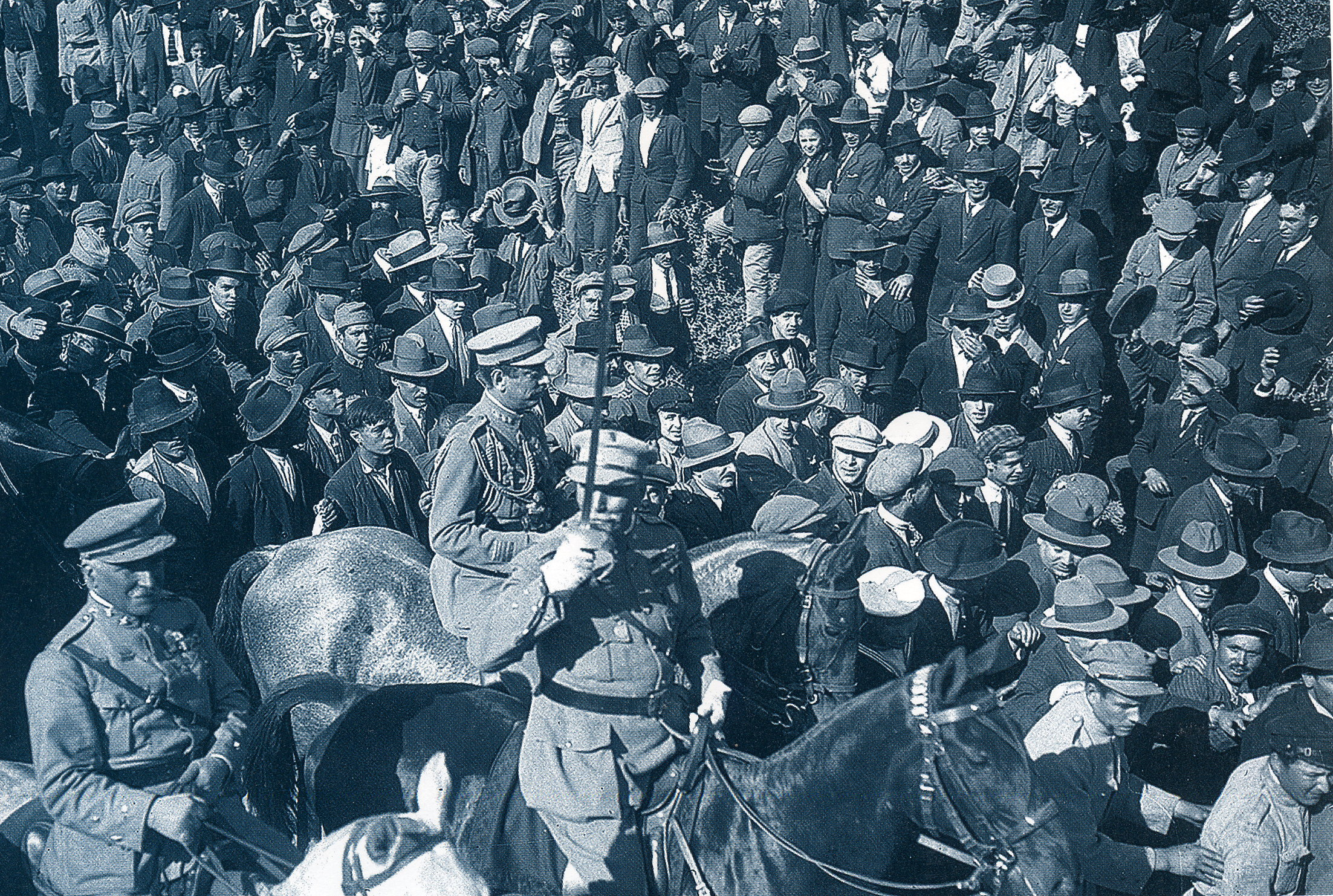
- Military procession of General Gomes da Costa and his troops after the 28 May 1926 Revolution
Date	28 May 1926 - 11 July 1926
Location	Portugal
Result	Collapse of the First Republic; Beginning of the Ditadura Militar

Belligerents
First Portuguese Republic: Government of Portugal	(Portugal) Portuguese Armed Forces; Portuguese Army; Portuguese Navy

Commanders and leaders
(Portugal) Bernardino Machado (Portugal) António Maria da Silva (Portugal) General Peres (Portugal) David Rodrigues	(Portugal) Mendes Cabeçadas (Portugal) Gomes da Costa (Portugal) Sinel de Cordes (Portugal) Filomeno da Câmara (Portugal) Passos e Sousa (Portugal) Raul Esteves

The 28 May 1926 coup d'état, sometimes called 28 May Revolution or, during the period of the corporatist Estado Novo (English: New State), the National Revolution (Portuguese: Revolução Nacional), was a military coup of a nationalist origin, that put an end to the unstable Portuguese First Republic and initiated 48 years of corporatist and nationalist rule within Portugal. The regime that immediately resulted from the coup, the Ditadura Nacional (National Dictatorship), would be later refashioned into the Estado Novo, which in turn lasted until the Carnation Revolution in 1974.

== Background ==
The chronic political instability and government's neglect of the army created opportunities for military plots. Historians have considered that the coup had wide support, including all political parties at the time except for the Democratic Party, Portuguese Communist Party, the Portuguese Socialist Party, the Seara Nova group, General Confederation of Labour, and the Democratic Leftwing Republican Party.

In 1925 there were three failed coup attempts: on 5 March (led by Filomeno da Câmara); 18 April (inspired by Sinel de Cordes and led by Raul Esteves and Filomeno da Câmara); and 19 July (led by Mendes Cabeçadas). The plotters were mostly acquitted by a military court. Óscar Carmona, acting as military prosecutor of the 18 April plot, asked that the plotters be absolved. During the trial, Óscar Carmona famously asked:

"Why do these men sit in the defendant bench? Because their homeland is sick and orders its best sons to be judged and tried."

The leaders of the 18 April plot were sent to the Nossa Senhora da Graça Fort, where they recruited the fort's commander, Passos e Sousa, to the rebel forces. The officers of the April 18 plot renewed in 1926 their planning to seize power and decided on General Manuel de Oliveira Gomes da Costa to lead the movement, who agreed to join the plotters on 25 May, 1926.

On 27 May, 1926, General Manuel de Oliveira Gomes da Costa arrived at Braga to launch a coup d'état. The First Portuguese Republic and Prime Minister António Maria da Silva, aware of the planned coup, tried to organize resistance.

== Coup ==
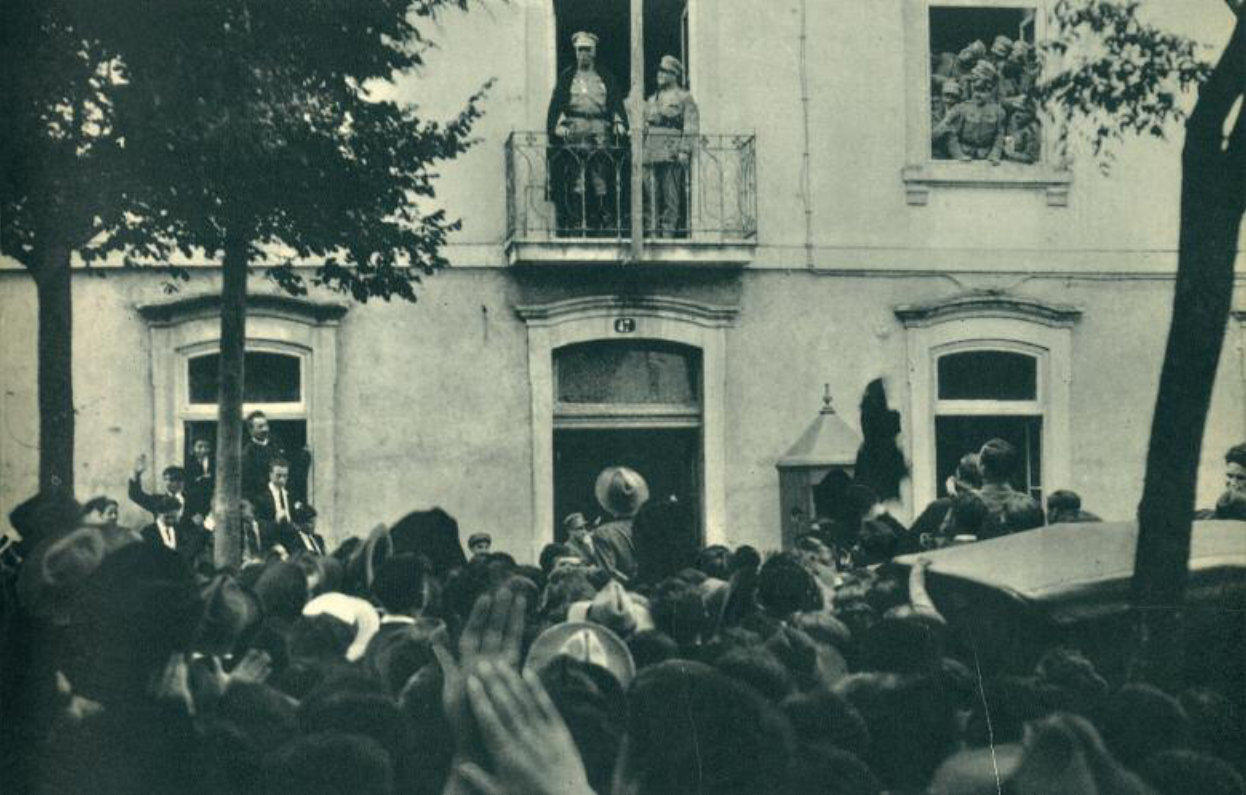
Gomes da Costa on the balcony of the Coimbra Civil Government, acclaimed by people, June 1926

The revolution started in Braga, commanded by General Manuel Gomes da Costa, followed immediately in Porto, Lisbon, Évora, Coimbra and Santarém. Generals Sinel de Cordes, Filomeno da Câmara, Passos e Sousa, and Raul Esteves also took part in the coup, leading the provincial military forces.

== Aftermath ==
On 30 May, President Bernardino Machado appointed José Mendes Cabeçadas as head of government and minister of every ministry and on the following day transferred his powers, as president, to Cabeçadas.

On 6 June, General Gomes da Costa marched on Lisbon's Avenida da Liberdade along with 15,000 men, being acclaimed by the people of the city. Five days later, on 11 June, Cabeçadas' units in Santarém demobilized. On 17 June, Gomes da Costa mobilized his units and demanded Cabeçadas' resignation. Cabeçadas resigned and transferred his powers to Gomes da Costa. Gomes da Costa then tried to get the ministers associated with Sinel de Cordes to resign. Yet, on 8 June a group of generals and colonels tried to get Gomes da Costa to accept a formal position of President, but he declined and was imprisoned on the following day. Two days later he was deported to the Azores. General Óscar Carmona was appointed head of government and the Ditadura Nacional began.

== Timeline ==
- 29 May:
  - The Portuguese Communist Party interrupted its Second Congress due to the political and military situation in the country.
  - The Confederação Geral do Trabalho (General Confederation of Labour) declared its neutrality in all military confrontations.
  - The 28.5.26 coup d'état spread to the rest of the country—influenced Mendes Cabeçadas, Sinel de Cordes and Óscar Carmona—and established the Ditadura Militar (National Military Dictatorship) against the democratic but unstable First Portuguese Republic.
  - The Government of Prime Minister António Maria da Silva resigned.
- 30 May:
  - The General Gomes da Costa was acclaimed in Porto.
  - The president of the republic, Bernardino Machado, resigned.
  - José Mendes Cabeçadas Júnior became Prime Minister and President of the Republic.
- 3 June: António de Oliveira Salazar became Minister of Finance; however, he resigned 16 days after.
- 3 June: A dictatorial decree dissolved the Congress of the Republic of Portugal (National Assembly).
- In addition, by dictatorial decree, the leaders of all the Municipalities were sacked.
- The Ditadura Militar banned the Carbonária.
- The Ditadura Militar banned all Political parties.
- 17 June: General Gomes da Costa provoked a second coup d'état.
- 19 June: General Gomes da Costa became Prime Minister.
- 22 June: The Ditadura Militar instituted Censorship.
- 29 June: General Gomes da Costa became President of the Republic.
- 9 July:
  - The Ditadura Militar forced General Gomes da Costa to resign—allowing him to go into exile.
  - General António Óscar de Fragoso Carmona, of the conservative military wing of the Ditadura Militar, became Prime Minister.
- 15 September: A military coup d'état failed.
- 18 September: Another military coup d'état failed.
- 29 November: General António Óscar Carmona became President of the Republic.
- 16 December: The Ditadura Militar created a political police called Police of Information of Lisbon.
