= February 1927 Revolt =

Military rebellion in Porto, Portugal

- Part of the Reviralhism
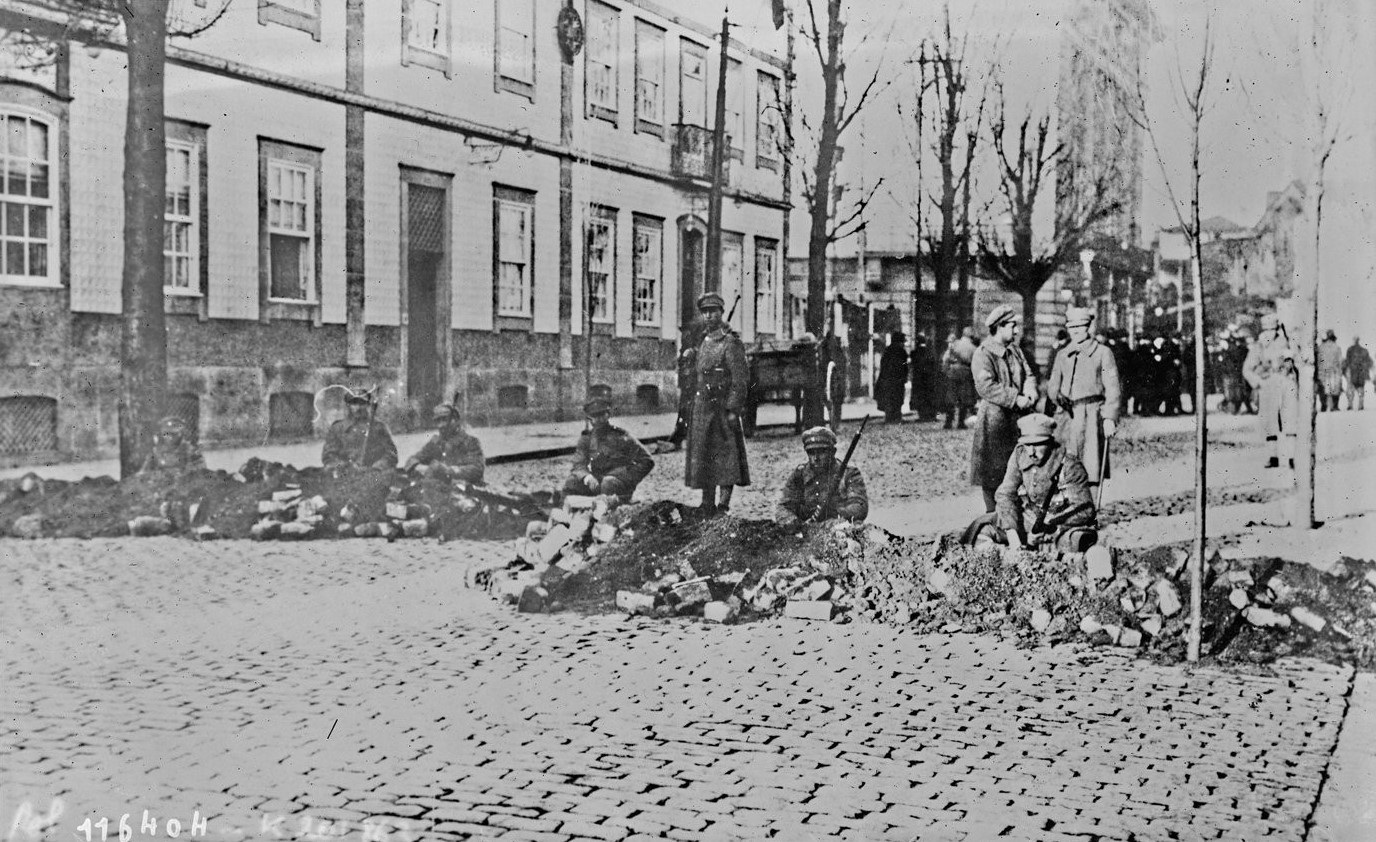
- Trenches of the insurgents in Porto
Date	3–9 February 1927
Location	Portugal

Belligerents
(Portugal) February 1927 movement: Rebel units of the Portuguese Army; Rebel units of the Portuguese Navy; Rebel units of the Republican National Guard; Democratic Party; Democratic Left-wing Republican Party; General Confederation of Labour	Military Dictatorship: Portuguese Army; Portuguese Navy; Republican National Guard

Commanders and leaders
Rebel Army command: Adalberto Gastão de Sousa Dias; Fernando Freiria; Jaime de Morais; Sarmento Pimentel; João Pereira de Carvalho; Agatão Lança; José Mendes dos Reis; João Manuel de Carvalho; Revolutionary Committee: Jaime Cortesão; Raul Proença; Jaime Alberto de Castro Morais; João Maria Ferreira Sarmento Pimentel; João Pereira de Carvalho; Supported by: José Domingues dos Santos	Óscar Carmona; Abílio Passos e Sousa; Adriano da Costa Macedo; Jaime Afreixo; João Carlos Craveiro Lopes; Augusto Manuel Farinha Beirão; António Lopes Mateus; Luís Manuel Domingues; Passos e Sousa

Units involved
6th Infantry Regiment; 9th Hunters Regiment; 6th Cavalry Regiment; Amarante Artillery Regiment; NRP Carvalho Araújo; NRP Ibo	18th Infantry Regiment; 8th Cavalry Regiment; 9th Cavalry Regiment; 5th Artillery Regiment

The February 1927 Revolt, sometimes also referred to as the February 1927 Revolution, was a military rebellion in Portugal that took place between February 3 and 9, 1927, centered in Porto, the city where the insurgents' command center was installed and fought the main challenges. The revolt, led by Adalberto Gastão de Sousa Dias, ended with the surrender and arrest of the rebels and resulted in about 80 deaths and 360 injuries in Porto and more than 70 deaths and 400 injuries in Lisbon. It was the first consequent attempt to overthrow the Military Dictatorship that was then consolidated in Portugal following the 28 May 1926 coup d'état, which occurred nine months earlier, initiating a set of insurrectionary movements that became known as the Reviralhism.

== Background ==
The victory of the 28 May 1926 coup d'état, nine months earlier, led to the establishment of the Military Dictatorship, with the 1911 Constitution of the First Portuguese Republic suspended, the parliament closed and civil liberties abolished. Although clearly anti-democratic, the regime that was then being drafted was in line with the anti-parliamentary movement that was growing in Europe and was accepted by a population tired of the instability and violence that had marked the last decade in Portugal. With governments that rarely exceeded a few months in force and a political life marked by successive coups, counter-coups and military pronouncements, strikes and attacks, the First Portuguese Republic collapsed as a viable political regime.

Despite the 28 May 1926 coup, the supporters of which later glorified as the "National Revolution", garnered the approval of many of the moderate Republicans and Democrats. The Republican left, although weakened by the arrests and deportations decreed by the government of Manuel Gomes da Costa in the months immediately following the coup, remained active and mobilized, particularly among the military and members of the security forces, routinely routed through dozens of coups and counter-coups over the past decade. For those military men, the 28 May 1926 coup was just another insurrection, just as transitory as the previous ones, liable to be reversed by yet another revolutionary movement.

In this context, in the Portuguese Army, in the Navy, in the Republican National Guard and in the rest of the security forces, there were many officers who were ready to restore republican and democratic ideals, and civil liberties along with them. The members of the military and militarized forces were joined by militants from workers' organizations, in particular the General Confederation of Labour (CGT), and from republican parties and institutions that remained in operation and continued to edit their press, despite increasing censorship and police restrictions.

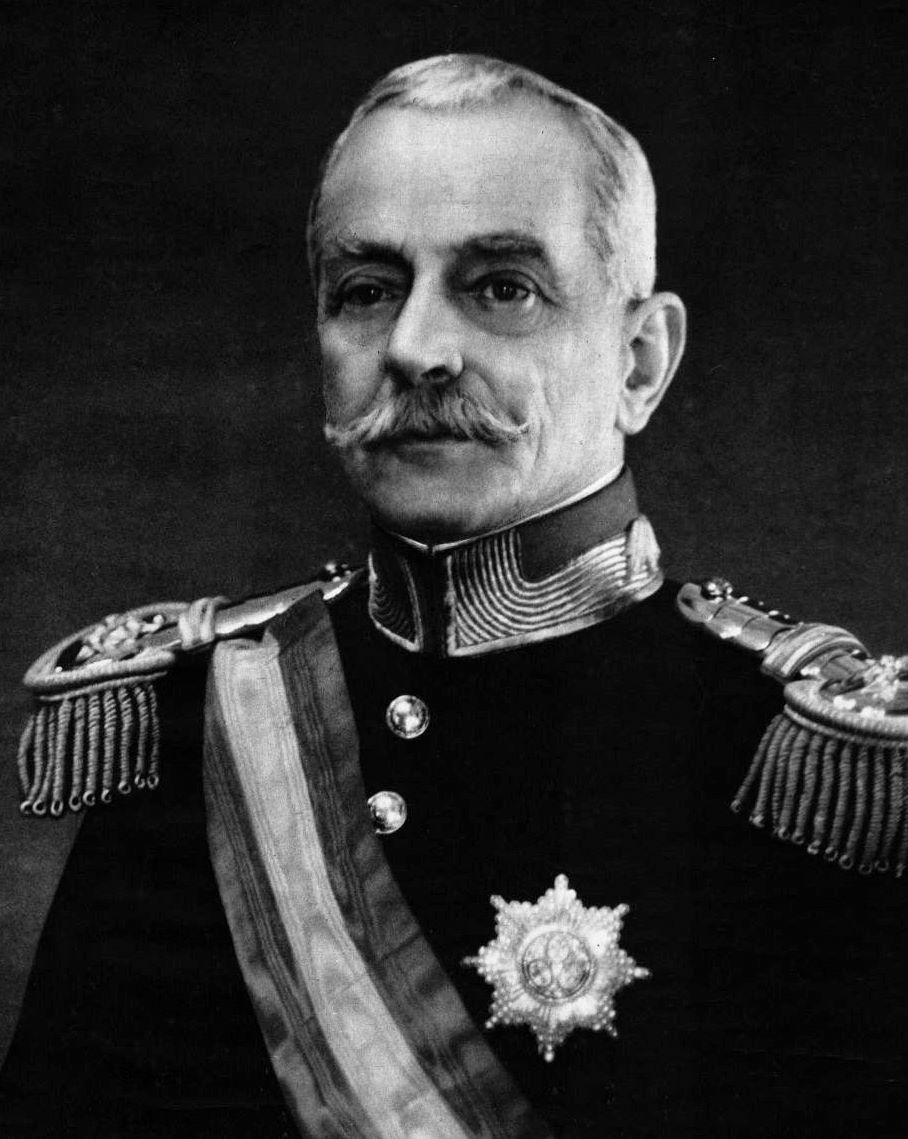
Óscar Carmona

After a decade of constant uprisings, and particularly after the revolutionary paroxysm of the years 1924 and 1925, all political quarters expected new revolutionary events and the imminence of the rebellion was public and notorious, and it was expected to emerge from the North, with its center in Porto. In order to protect the situation and guarantee loyalty, Óscar Carmona, then the most prestigious military leader and President of the Republic, visited the city of Porto and the region's military units in late January. Around that same time, several ministers met in the barracks of the Artillery Regiment 3, in Lisbon, counting shotguns and ordering alerts and prevention throughout the country.

Thus, the February 1927 Revolt began as another routine military rebellion, following the dozens that had marked the final years of the First Portuguese Republic, not even having the element of surprise, since it was expected by the Government and the forces who opposed it. Nor was it the first attempt against the new regime, as in Chaves, as early as 11 September 1926, there had been a rebellion of the infantry forces stationed there, in an inconsequential movement and without repercussions in the country, seen by some as a mere manifestation of insurrectionary itching among the military, but that still served as a reminder that rebellion had not died.

Despite its predictability and framing in the process prior to the 28 May 1926 coup, the February 1927 movement had a well-defined objective: halt the consolidation of the military dictatorship that emerged from the May 28, 1926 Coup.

The February 1927 Revolt, without success, was nevertheless a turning point, marking the beginning of Reviralhismo. Despite its cost in lives, history later proved it to be the first and only rebellion to pose a real threat to the dictatorship and the consolidation of the subsequent Estado Novo.

== The rebellion ==
=== The planning ===
The revolt was organized by a committee of northern Democrats, mostly from Porto, among whom were included prestigious military and Democrats, such as Adalberto Gastão de Sousa Dias, while in prison and on leave at the Military Hospital of Porto, Jaime de Morais, Sarmento Pimentel and João Pereira de Carvalho, and leading figures from the Republican movement, such as Jaime Cortesão, who had been medical captain of the Portuguese Expeditionary Corps, and José Domingues dos Santos.

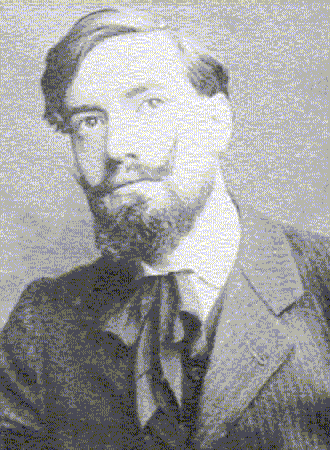
Jaime Cortesão

It is known that on 25 June 1926, less than a month after the 28 May coup, a revolt against the military dictatorship was already being prepared, in a process led by the so-called National Library Group, which included among others Raul Proença, Jaime Cortesão and David Ferreira, the first with strong connections to Seara Nova. Although linked to this group, the organization of the February 1927 Revolt resulted from the maturation of a set of anti-dictatorial initiatives that were coalescing around the figure of Sousa Dias, a figure that had stood out in the reaction to the 28 May coup of the previous year.

Since Sousa Dias was under arrest at the Military Hospital of Porto, and there was an important nucleus of Republicans and Democrats in that city, which was joined by a democratic tradition within the military units stationed there, it was decided to establish the city of Porto as the starting point of the rebellion, in the expectation of a quick adhesion of the units of Lisbon and of the rest of the country. To serve as a liaison with the revolutionaries in Lisbon, Raul Proença left for Porto on 21 January 1927, participating in the planning of operations and in unleashing the revolt.

After the military uprising in Porto, the revolt was to spread to Lisbon, where adherent military units, supported by civilians mobilized by workers' and democratic organizations, were to prevent the sending of reinforcements to government forces in northern Portugal and immobilize the Government for long enough to allow the consolidation of the new political situation in Porto and the expansion of the movement to the garrisons of other regions.

The revolt was scheduled to take place during the celebrations of 31 January, but the delays and hesitations among the conspirators ended up delaying it to 3 February.

=== The revolt in Porto ===
The rebellion started at 4:30 am on 3 February, with the departure of the 9th Hunters Regiment, which was joined by most of the 6th Cavalry Regiment, coming from Penafiel, several nuclei of other regiments of the city and a company from the National Republican Guard stationed in Bela Vista, Porto.

The command of the forces had been entrusted to Adalberto Gastão de Sousa Dias, with Fernando Freiria as chief of staff, supported by a revolutionary committee made up of Jaime Cortesão, Raul Proença, Jaime Alberto de Castro Morais, João Maria Ferreira Sarmento Pimentel and João Pereira de Carvalho. Among the supporters also included José Domingues dos Santos, the leader of the democratic left who in 1918 had directed the civil conspiracy against the Monarchy of the North.

Jaime Cortesão was immediately appointed civil governor of Porto and Raul Proença, in addition to being a conspirator, was an organizer and combatant with weapons in hand, serving as a liaison with the co-conspirators of Lisbon.

During the dawn and morning of 3 February, the forces of the rebels went to the area of Batalha Square, where the headquarters of the Military Region and of the Civil Government and the most important telegraph station were located. In that first action, General José Ernesto de Sampaio and Colonel João de Morais Zamith, respectively first and second commanders of the Military Region, Lieutenant Colonel Luís Monteiro Nunes da Ponte, Porto's civil governor, and his replacement, Major Sequeira Tavares, the commander of the force that guarded the headquarters and the president of the Press Censorship Commission, were imprisoned.

Government forces, after a few hours of disorganization, were made up of a small part of the 18th Infantry Regiment, which had Colonel Raul Peres as commander, the 9th Cavalry Regiment and the 5th Artillery Regiment, which were quartered in the Serra do Pilar. On the afternoon of 3 February, under the command of Colonel João Carlos Craveiro Lopes, chief of staff of the Military Region and military governor of the city, the pro-government forces concentrated on the Serra do Pilar barracks and opened fire from artillery against the rebels.

On the morning of the same day, in a risky maneuver, but indicative of the certainty that loyalty to the Government of the troops of Lisbon was assured, the Minister of War, Colonel Abílio Augusto Valdez de Passos e Sousa, left Lisbon in a train with destination to Vila Nova de Gaia, where it arrived at dusk. He then assumed the operational control of the pro-government forces installed there under the command of Colonel João Carlos Craveiro Lopes, remaining at the front until the subjugation of the rebels.

Early on the morning of 4 February, the soldiers of the Amarante Artillery Regiment joined the rebels, whose artillery pieces forced government forces to retreat to Monte da Virgem, from where the bombing of the rebels continued. That same morning, the rebel forces were concentrated in the city area around Praça da Batalha, around which trenches, machine guns and artillery pieces were set up. At the confluence of Praça da Batalha and Rua de Entreparedes, two artillery pieces were installed.

On the morning of 4 February, the 8th Cavalry Regiment, coming from Aveiro, faithful to the Government, managed to penetrate the fire of the revolutionaries and cross the Dom Luís I Bridge, but was stopped by the barricades that defended Praça da Batalha. The fate of the faithful troops to the Government were stationed in the city of Porto itself, which was rejected by the intense fire in the trenches of the revolutionaries when they tried to advance on the positions of the rebels.

Meanwhile, messages of adhesion from various garrisons began to arrive, but not from the expected garrisons in Lisbon. Troops belonging to units stationed in Viana do Castelo, Figueira da Foz and Faro joined, the latter supported by forces from Olhão, Tavira and Vila Real de Santo António, but due to lack of support, particularly from Lisbon, the encounters in these cities were sporadic and the rebellion was, for the most part, subdued within a few hours.

On the afternoon of February 4, when military adhesions did not live up to expectations, Raul Proença, deeply involved in the revolt, summoned civilians to fight alongside the rebels, but with little success. The movement would remain essentially military until the end, with few civilian adherences. Even the remaining forces of the National Republican Guard stationed in and around Porto made it known, through their commander, Major Alves Viana, that they would remain neutral, guaranteeing the policing of the city "in defense of the lives and assets of the citizens", but not interfering in the feud between the military.

Throughout the day, the perimeter defenses around Praça da Batalha were consolidated, with the placement of a machine gun at the top of Rua de 31 de Janeiro and at Rua de Santa Catarina, to prevent progression on those streets. Such was the death caused by the machine gun placed there that the position was known as the death trench.

To complete the defensive perimeter, another machine gun was placed in a trench built at the confluence of the streets of Cima de Vila and Madeira, an artillery piece was mounted at the corner of the Hospital do Ordem do Terço building, facing Rua do Cativo, and placed a machine gun in the missing Largo do Corpo da Guarda, at the top of the street that still maintained this designation. In addition, the pavement was raised and two pieces of artillery were assembled on Rua de Alexandre Herculano, at the junction with Praça da Batalha and Rua de Entreparedes.

In addition to soldiers from the 6th Infantry Regiment, from Penafiel, and the GNR da Bela Vista stationed along Rua Chã, patrols made up of soldiers and civilians were placed along the entire perimeter.

On the afternoon of this day, Commander Jaime de Morais, military head of the Northern Revolutionary Committee, sent Óscar Carmona a telegram containing an ultimatum stating:

The revolting officers decided to reintegrate the country within the constitutional democratic regime, with the formation of a National Government that affirmed the supremacy of the civil power, guarded and defended by the armed forces, which thus would have restored the functions from which they diverted it.

On the same day, and in the immediate days, forces from Penafiel, Póvoa do Varzim, Famalicão, Guimarães, Valença, Vila Real, Peso da Régua and Lamego were joined by the Porto rebels. More artillery arrived from Amarante, which was parked in the vicinity of Monte Pedral. Figueira da Foz's artillery was detained in Pampilhosa as it was heading for Porto.

Contrary to what was predicted by the rebels, until the end of 4 February there were no adhesions in Lisbon, the vital center of political-military power, which allowed the Minister of War, Colonel Passos e Sousa, to concentrate all forces in the fight to the entrenched in Porto. On the afternoon of this day, the position of the rebels was critical, as the pro-government forces dominated Lisbon and the entire south of Portugal and controlled the south bank of the Douro, making it unlikely that the rebels would be reinforced.

However, on the morning of 5 February, the Infante de Sagres arrived in Leixões, with government troops, commanded by Colonel Augusto Manuel Farinha Beirão, while more government forces crossed the Douro in Valbom and headed for the city center.

That same morning, a conciliation attempt was made, which led Commander Jaime de Morais and Major Severino to visit the headquarters of the Minister of War, installed in a building on Avenida das Devezas, in Gaia, in an attempt to negotiate a surrender, in exchange for freedom for the rebels. The revolutionaries' parliamentarians were forced to cross the city blindfolded, but the result was inconclusive since the Minister refused a surrender that was not unconditional: either total surrender or the bombing of the city. Reconciliation failed, as of 4 pm on 5 February, an artillery duel was fought between the two banks of the Douro River.

During the afternoon of 5 February, the siege of the Porto rebels began to take place: from the north, troops were landed in Leixões by the Infante de Sagres; from the east, troops loyal to the Government advanced from Bragança and Régua, led by António Lopes Mateus; and to the south, in Vila Nova de Gaia, about 4,000 men were gathered from various garrisons, armed with abundant artillery. Facing the tightening of the siege, on the night of 5 February, the rebels proposed an armistice, but Passos e Sousa responded, on the morning of the 6th, with the reiteration of the demand for unconditional surrender and the threat of even more intense and heavy bombardment, including the use of howitzers.

Raul Proença returned to Lisbon on the night of 6 February to ask for help and to try to unleash the revolt in that city, since the movement, without the expected support, was beginning to face serious difficulties in Porto.

In those circumstances, all that remained was to negotiate a surrender, since a bayonet attack against the government batteries of Serra do Pilar (Gaia) to reverse the situation was virtually impossible, with the bombing of the city being certain. With their eyes set on Lisbon, where at great cost and with an exasperating slowness the movement finally seemed to take off, the rebels resisted during the 6th and 7th of February, but as the hours went by and the ammunition ran out, the feeling of defeat and the voices that advocated surrender began to rise.

Finally, on the afternoon of 7 February, when ammunition was exhausted, the headquarters of the rebels, installed in the São João National Theatre, ordered the dispersion of the civilians stationed there. At midnight, General Sousa Dias arrived at the 5th Artillery Regiment, in Gaia, where he signed a document through Major Alves Viana, from the GNR, in which he proposed surrender, safeguarding the exemption of sergeants', corporals' and soldiers' responsibilities. Passos e Sousa accepted only the exemption of corporals and soldiers, declaring that the officers and sergeants involved would be punished. Any civilian caught with guns in hand would be immediately shot.

With no further options, at 3:00 am on 8 February, Sousa Dias accepted the proposed conditions and ordered the surrender of the rebels. At 8:30 am, Passos e Sousa entered the city triumphantly, over the Don Luís bridge. The revolt in Porto was over.

Shortly afterwards, João Carlos Craveiro Lopes sent Óscar Carmona the following telegram:

Troops entered Praça da Batalha, Porto, at 8:30 am, taking over the city where life is resuming its normalcy. On the afternoon of that same 8 February, Minister Passos e Sousa left for Lisbon, the city where the revolt was now on.

During the 5 days that the revolt in Porto lasted, more than 100 people lost their lives, including military and civilians, including journalist António Maria Lopes Teixeira, director of Diário do Porto. More than 500 people were injured, some of whom succumbed in the immediate days. The damage caused by the bombings and shootings was also great, with many houses devastated and many public buildings badly damaged.

=== The revolt in Lisbon ===
As of 5 February, workers' strikes and unrest began to occur in Lisbon, in solidarity with the Porto rebels. The military, however, remained in the barracks.

The unrest grew and on 6 February groups of civilians mutinied, being repressed by the Police and the GNR. Café Brasileira and other meeting points were closed by the police, accused of being places where revolutionary rallies were held. Faithful to the tradition of radicalism that had marked the last few decades, the Arsenal sailors revolted and together with armed civilians assaulted the Brigada do Alfeite. Simultaneously, in Barreiro, the South-and-Southeast railway workers declare a general strike, paralyzing the train traffic south of the Tagus, to which the Government responded with a military occupation of the railway installations.

After many hesitations, it was only on 7 February, when the movement was already collapsing in Porto, that the first adhesions among the military appeared. Adhesions were scarce and faltering, apparently more dictated by solidarity with the forces in Porto than by the conviction of success: it was the "revolution of remorse" in the words of Sarmento Pimentel.

The forces that joined were commanded by Commander Agatão Lança, assisted by Colonel José Mendes dos Reis. In view of the alienation of the main units of the Army, the rebels were mostly sailors and companies of the Republican National Guard, supported by armed civilians, many of whom were former members of the White Ant Movement.

Some Armada units joined, including the cruiser NRP Carvalho Araújo, under the command of commander João Manuel de Carvalho and the gunboat NRP Ibo. When the insurgents concentrated on the Arsenal, they were bombed by the Aviation, which had decided to remain loyal to the Government.

On the government side in Lisbon, the defense was coordinated, first, by General Luís Manuel Domingues and, after the 9th, by Passos e Sousa. The bulk of the Army aligned with government positions, leaving the insurgents isolated and poorly armed, despite having assaulted the War Material Depot and the Weapons Factory.

On the night of 8 February, the Minister of War, Passos e Sousa, entered Lisbon, coming from the victory in Porto. Accompanied by troops also from the north, he took control of government forces and tightened his grip on the rebels, who demanded, as he had already done in Porto, unconditional surrender.

The following afternoon, on 9 February, at 7.30 pm, without ammunition, Mendes dos Reis agreed to surrender without conditions.

The threat of summary firing of civilians found to be armed, which had also been carried out in Porto, was fulfilled in Lisbon: on the 9th, next to the Largo do Rato fountain, several civilians and sailors were executed by firing squad.

In Lisbon, fighting between the rebels and government forces caused at least 90 deaths and more than 400 injuries.

=== The fate of the rebels ===
Once the dispute is over, the defeated insurgents made a bitter analysis of the events, pointing out as the main reason for the failure the lack of adhesion in Lisbon:

The simultaneous revolt in Lisbon and Porto was expected. But did not happen. Hence the disaster. It also did not come out with all the strength that it had or that was compromised. The organization could and should have gone further, dealing with the hardships of the bad guys; but the optimism, counting on adhesions that did not come and others that took time, was fatal.

The testimony of Sousa Dias considered that the failure was essentially:

due to the lack of action by more than sufficient military elements to guarantee its success throughout the country, and which were lacking at the same time.

All prisoners were taken to the Lisbon Penitentiary two days later, taken from the various cities and towns where they had been detained.

In a booklet published in 1927, officers arrested at the end of the revolt were identified. They were General Sousa Dias, two colonels, three majors, 18 captains, 55 lieutenants, six ensigns, three musicians from the military bands. The same work reports that by 11 February, 125 sergeants and 22 civilians had been arrested.

== Consequences of the February 1927 Revolt ==
The revolt had the immediate consequences of: (1) the hardening of the repression of the dictatorial regime, with the dictatorship acting to give priority to order over the New Constitutional Order; (2) the reorganization of the reviralista opposition, now with its leaders mostly exiled, detained or in hiding; and (3) the public appearance of movements to support the dictatorship and the institutionalization of party support for the Dictatorship.

The hardening of the repression was translated almost immediately by a series of liquidations and dissolutions. By Decree No. 13 137, of 15 February 1927, the employees involved in the revolts were dismissed, including Jaime Cortesão and Raul Proença, and by Decree No. 13 138, of the same day, the units of the Republican National Guard and the Army that had supported the Uprising were also dismissed. The same Decree dissolved the political and civic organizations that had joined. Among the dissolved organizations was the General Confederation of Labour, which on 27 May had its headquarters and its newspaper A Batalha closed, already having been assaulted by protesters on 6 May.

Still in the repressive field, Bernardino Machado was given an exile order, who, summoned to leave Portugal, left for Vigo. Liquidation was carried out in key places, with the dismissed being replaced by supporters of the Dictatorship: on 15 March, the rector of the University of Coimbra, Fernando Duarte Silva de Almeida Ribeiro, asked for the dismissal, being replaced on 7 May by Domingos Fezas Vital, who remained in place until December 1930. Colonel Augusto Manuel Farinha Beirão, one of the commanders of the repression of the Porto revolt, was appointed on 27 May as Commander of the Republican National Guard.

To make the opposition's control mechanisms more effective, on 26 March a political police department was created in Lisbon, called the Special Information Police. This police would later be the embryo of the political police of the Estado Novo, for which agents of the defunct State Security Preventive Police were recruited. On 11 April, the Special Information Police was created in Porto and Lieutenant Alfredo de Morais Sarmento was appointed as its chief.

The reorganization of the democratic field led to the appearance in exile, on 12 March 1927, of the Paris League, with Afonso Costa, Álvaro de Castro, José Domingues dos Santos, Jaime Cortesão and António Sérgio as leaders, now all exiles, mostly in Paris.

In the other field, among the supporters of the dictatorship, institutionalization began: as soon as 9 February the Academic Confederation of the National Union appeared, the first civilian movement to support the dictatorship, created by Vicente de Freitas and inspired by the Spanish Patriotic Union of Miguel Primo de Rivera. The new movement immediately obtained the support of periodicals linked to the right-wing and to the Catholic Church.

In conclusion, the February 1927 Revolt was a defining moment in the ideological fields that would fight each other in the following decades, marking, in fact, the emergence of reviralhism and resistance to the Portuguese dictatorship.

== See also ==
- Madeira uprising
- August 26 Revolt
