= Mesquita =

Mesquita, Portuguese for "mosque", may also refer to:

== People ==
- Mesquita (surname)
  - Mesquita Machado (fl. 1976–2013), Portuguese politician

== Places in Brazil ==
- Mesquita, Minas Gerais, a municipality in Minas Gerais
- Mesquita, Rio de Janeiro, a municipality in Rio de Janeiro

== Sports ==
- Mesquita Futebol Clube, a football club from Mesquita, Rio de Janeiro
