= Amir Khair =

Amir Khair is a Brazilian economist, financial consultant and former Secretary of Finance of the city of São Paulo. He is a common commentator on the Brazilian newspaper of O Estado de S. Paulo. He has repeatedly criticized the high level of the interest rate charged by the banks in Brazil.
