= Raul Mesquita =

Portuguese author (born 1949)

Raúl Mesquita
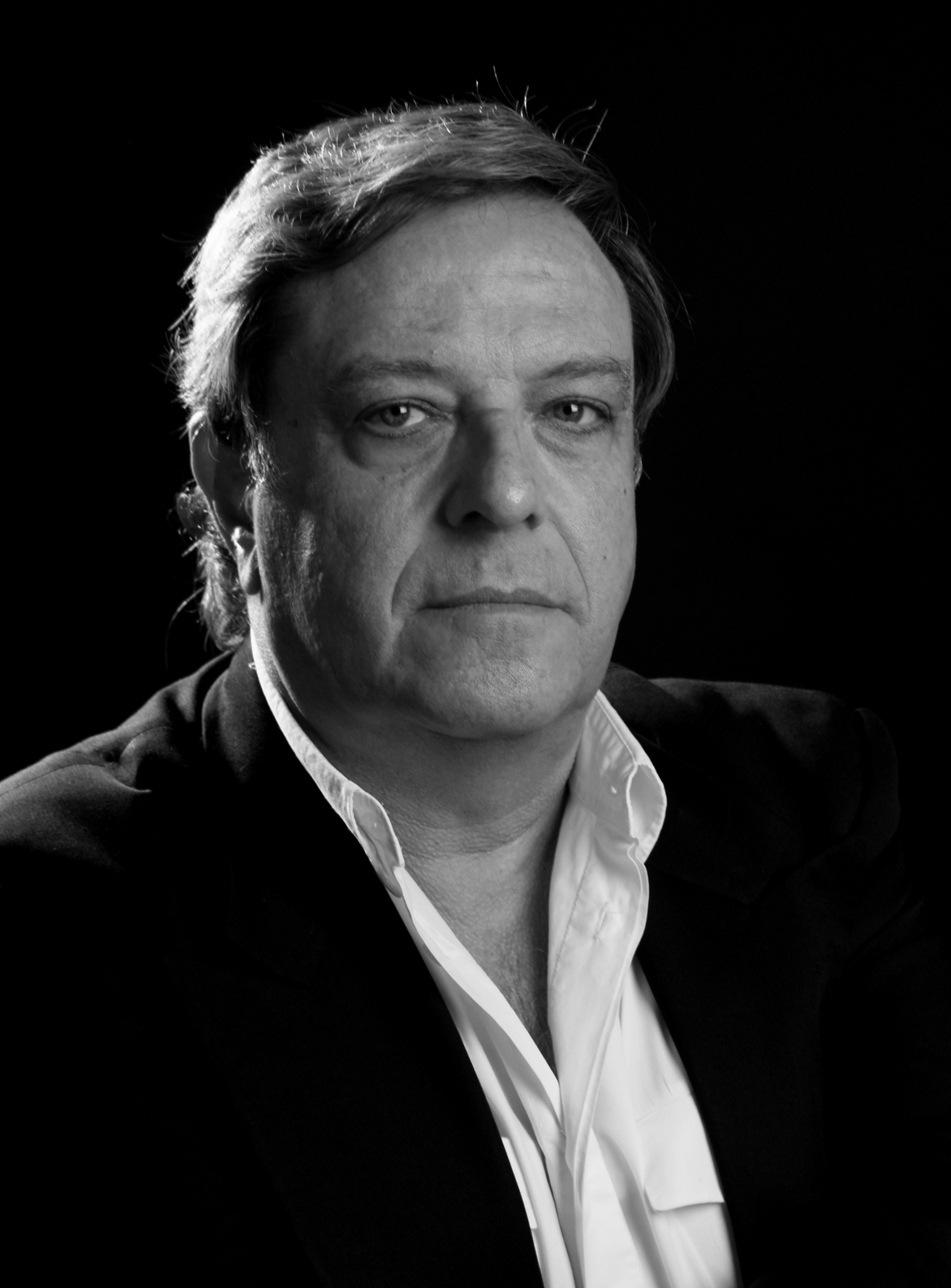
- Mesquita in Lisbon, 2008
- Born: Raúl António Proença de Marcelino Mesquita; May 12, 1949 (age 77); Lisbon, Portugal
- Education: University of Lisbon
- Occupations: Professor, Writer, Philosopher
- Relatives: Raul Proença
- Writing career
- Pen name: Raúl Mesquita
- Language: Portuguese european
- Genres: Fiction, Romance, Educational, Biography
- Subject: Fiction
- Website: omelhordosdoismundos.blogs.sapo.pt

Raúl António Proença de Marcelino Mesquita (born May 12, 1949) is a Portuguese author. He graduated in with a degree in philosophy from the Lisbon Classical University.

== Biography ==
Raúl Mesquita was born in Lisbon, where he attended the Lycée Français, followed by the grammar schools Liceu Camões and Liceu D. João de Castro, finishing his studies at the Lisbon Classical University. Grandson of Raul Proença, he escaped from Portugal in June 1970 as a conscientious objector. He then lived in Belgium and in the United Kingdom, and was recognised as a political exile by the UN in Brussels in December 1970.

He returned to his homeland in December 1974, after the Democratic revolution. He has published works both in psychology and in philosophy, such as, a Psychology Dictionary (co-author), Dicionário de Psicologia and the Critical Dictionary of Philosophy, (Dicionário Crítico de Filosofia) sole author, Plátano Editora.

Recently he has turned to fiction. In 2007 his novel Estoril 1959 was published by Imprensa Nacional Casa da Moeda (Biblioteca de Autores Portugueses).

In 2008 he published the novel O Pai e os Outros – Uma Pequena História de Doidos, at Colibri Publishers. Also in 2008, Sílabo Publishers published his Translation, Preface and Footnotes of the Maximes et Réflexions Morales, by La Rochefoucauld.

He came out with the novel Censurado/Aprovado at Althum in December 2010. In 2013 Cosmos Editores published his essay on The Marquis of Sade, Sade e a Liberdade, a Natureza e a Montreuil.

Raúl Mesquita came out in 2014 with his memoirs of his life in Brussels and London, Martelos e Berbequins - Memórias.

He wrote and broadcast programmes for the Portuguese Classical Radio Antena 2. He has also taught philosophy but now spends his time writing and delivering presentations.

== Conferences ==
- Wagner, music and words – Nietzsche, words and music, 2001.
- Debaucheries – the Libertines Débauche as a means of living against hypocrisy 2007.
- The Allegory of the Cave – A myth? A mirror of an illusion? 2007.
- Spinoza and Freedom, 2007.
- The Libertines and the 18th century, 2008.
- Organized a conference on Raul Proença and the 1927 February 7 Revolution against the Portuguese dictatorship. The orator has been the Historian and History Professor António Reis, 2008.
- Collaborated in the production of "A Ópera do Malandro", by Chico Buarque (Auditório Camões) em 2007.

Raúl Mesquita loves Belcanto, but does not ignore the Germanic Tradition, for instance, Wagner, Richard Strauss or Alban Berg. This passion for music gave him the opportunity to collaborate with the Classical Portuguese Radio Antena 2. He has interviewed world-famous singers and conductors.

Fiction published

- Estoril 1959 [6] (ISBN 978-972-27-1538-6)
- O Pai e os Outros - Uma pequena história de doidos (ISBN 978-972-772-828-2)
- Censurado/Aprovado

More recently he wrote three plays which he entitled "The Lisbon Trilogy": The Key; Zigzags and The Drone (Bee)
