= Luis Valadares Tavares =

Professor at University of Lisbon

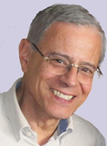
Luís Valadares Tavares

Luís Valadares Tavares is a professor emeritus of Systems and Management of the University of Lisbon (IST - Instituto Superior Técnico), President of OPET - Portuguese Observatory of Technology Foresight, President of APMEP - Portuguese Society of Portuguese Markets, Chairman of the European Conferences on E-Public Procurement, Non-Executive Member of the Board of Martifer.

== Education ==
He was born in Lisbon 28 March 1946, and completed his secondary education in Oporto (1963), and obtained his master's degree on Civil Engineering (Licenciatura) at IST He obtained his master's degree on Operational Research at the University of Lancaster (1970), his PHD (Honors) on Engineering Sciences (IST, 1973), and the title of Agregado (IST, 1977). He is full professor since 1980 and full professor emeritus since 2007.

== Major teaching activities ==
He initiated on 1970 the first program on Operational Research taught in Portugal as an interdisciplinary subject at IST in Engineering courses and during more than forty years has been teaching Applied Statistical Models and OR also at the Faculty of Economic and Management Sciences of the Portuguese Catholic University at the graduation and Master level. He has been teaching for short periods or giving lectures as in many foreign institutions such as University Of Columbia (Ny), Rand Corporation, Université De Paris Dauphine, IESE (Madrid), Middle East Technical University (Ankara), Université Mohamed V (Rabat), Inter University Institute Of Macau - Iium - (Macao – People’s Republic Of China), University Of Tsing-Hua (Beijing), Puc-Catholic University Of Rio (Rio).He published textbooks to support his teaching. Director of the E-Learning Program on Management Sciences – DISLOGO of the Portuguese Catholic University (1996-2002)

== Books ==
He is author of several textbooks:

- Tavares, L. Valadares, Nunes Correia, F., 1999, “Optimização Linear e Não Linear”, Calouste Gulbenkian Foundation, Lisbon, 2nd Edition.
- Tavares, L.V., Themido, I., Oliveira, R., Nunes Correia, F., 1996, “Investigação Operacional”, McGraw-Hill.
- Tavares, L. Valadares, 1998, Advanced Models on Project Management, Boston, Kluwer Academic Publishers.
- Tavares, L. Valadares, Antunes, C.H., 2000, “Casos de Aplicação de Investigação Operacional”, Mc Graw-Hill.
- Tavares, L. Valadares, 2008, “O Modelo e o Software SIAP 2008 para avaliação de propostas e candidaturas segundo o Código dos Contratos Públicos (DL18/2008)”, OPET;
- Tavares, L. Valadares, 2008, “A Gestão das Aquisições Públicas, Guia de Aplicação do Código dos Contratos Públicos (DL 18/2008), Empreitadas, Bens e Serviços”, OPET;
- Tavares, L. Valadares e M. Lopes Rocha, 2009, “O Guia da Contratação Electrónica”, OPET, ISBN 978-989-95697-5-1.

== Distinctions ==
- Grande Oficial da Ordem do Infante awarded by the President of Republic (2009)

== Personal life ==
He lives in Lisbon and is married with two children and 3 grandchildren.
