= Jaime Cortesão =

Portuguese politician

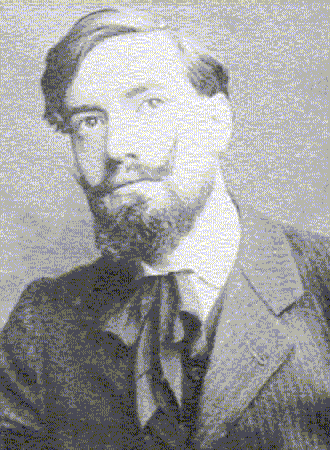
- Born: 29 April 1884; Ançã, Cantanhede
- Died: 14 August 1960 (aged 76); Lisbon
- Occupations: doctor, politician, historian, author

Jaime Zuzarte Cortesão (29 April 1884 – 14 August 1960) was a Portuguese medical doctor, politician, historian and writer.

He was born in Ançã near Cantanhede. Later he studied at the University of Porto for his medical studies. In 1919, he was director of the National Library in Lisbon. In 1921, he wrote several articles in the review Atlantida and the periodical Seara Nova. In 1919, he was officer of the Order of St. Jacob of the Sword. As he was a democrat and a republican, he was one of the first leaders of counter-rebellion in Porto in 1927 against the Authoritarian National dictatorship (later Estado Novo) He was sent into exile into France and in 1940 into Brazil. Later, he returned to Portugal in 1957 where he died in 1960. A memorial to him is located in the Cemiterio dos Prazeres in Lisbon.

He was posthumously awarded the Grand Officer of the Order of Freedom and the Grand Cross of the Order of Prince Henry the Navigator.

== Works ==
Some of the work he did as a historian was related to Portuguese discoveries in the New World. He suggested that the Bianco world map depicted part of the coast of Brazil before 1448.This was later refuted by Abel Fontoura da Costa who proved that it actually depicted Santiago. the largest island of the Cape Verde archipelago.

=== List of works ===
Poetry:

- 1910: A Morte da águia
- 1923: Divina voluptuosidade
- 1940: Missa da meia-noite

Dramas:

- 1916: O Infante de Sagres (Knight of Sagres)
- 1921: Adão e Eva (Adam and Eve)

Non-fiction:

- 1941: O carácter lusitano do descobrimento do Brasil (The Lusitanian Character on the Discovery of Brazil)
- 1943: A carta de Pêro Vaz de Caminha (Map by Pero Vaz de Caminha)
- 1949: Eça de Queiroz e a questão social (Eça Queiroz and the Social Question)
- 1960/1962: Os descobrimentos portugueses (Portuguese Discoveries) - 2 volumes
