= Maria Manuela Chaves =

Portuguese agronomist

Maria Manuela Chaves (born in Ponta Delgada, Portugal, on September 10, 1946) is a Portuguese agronomist and researcher known for her research on ecophysiology, or plant adaptations during development in adverse conditions. Her research specifically focused on applications to agriculture with a specialization on the adaptation of grapevines and Vineyards in response to drought conditions created by climate change. She is the author of the book Grapevine in a Changing Environment and was awarded the scientific merit medal from the Ministry of Science, Technology and Higher Education in 2017.

== Education ==
Chaves received a doctorate in agronomy in 1986 from the University of Lisbon (then, the Technical University of Lisbon).

== Career ==
Chaves was a professor and lecturer researching and teaching plant physiology and from 1996 until her retirement in 2008. After her retirement, Chaves was honored with the title of Professor Emeritus of the University of Lisbon for her contributions to the university and the field of agronomy. From 1998 to 2005 she was the co-founder and President of the Portuguese Society of Plant Physiology and from 1999 to 2002 she was first Chair of the Portuguese Committee for the International Geosphere-Biosphere Program. Additionally, from 2002 to 2007 she was on the 6th EU Framework Program.

Chaves currently leads the Plant Molecular Eco physiology Laboratory in the Botany Department at the Institute of Biological Chemical Technology (ITQB) from the University of Lisbon. She is also a member of the Lisbon Academy of Sciences as well as a member of the Advisory Committee for Global Change.

== Recognition and awards ==
Chaves received the Annals of Botany Lecturer award in 2008 which is featured in the plant biology scientific journal Annals of Botany. She was also honored by Ciência Viva in the second edition of the book Mulheres na Ciência (published 2019) along with other notable Portuguese female scientists.

She was awarded the scientific merit medal from the Ministry of Science, Technology and Higher Education in 2017 for her work on the ability of plants to adapt to conditions adverse to their development and the agricultural applications of this research.

== Publications ==
Chaves has been published in over 270 research papers and has been cited over 26,000 times over the course of her career. She has several notable papers in high impact journals in the field of agronomy, namely:

- 2003 Understanding plant responses to drought – from genes to the whole plant (Citations: 3,287)
- 2009 Photosynthesis under drought and salt stress: regulation mechanisms from whole plant to cell (Citations: 3,080)
- 2002 How Plants Cope with Water Stress in the Field? Photosynthesis and Growth (Citations: 1,838)
- 2004 Mechanisms underlying plant resilience to water deficits: prospects for water-saving agriculture (Citations: 1,197)
- 1990 Effects of Water Deficits on Carbon Assimilation (Citations: 1,093)
