= Fernão Lara Mesquita =

Brazilian journalist

Fernão Lara Mesquita is a Brazilian journalist. He was a director of Grupo Estado, a media conglomerate founded and controlled by the Mesquita family, which publishes the daily newspaper O Estado de S. Paulo, one of the largest newspapers in Brazil. Grupo Estado also owns a radio network, and owns Agência Estado, Brazil's leading news agency. Mesquita is also the former opinion-page editor of O Estado de S. Paulo. Today he manages the website Vespeiro, which he founded.

In a talk delivered at the 2011 Oslo Freedom Forum, he drew attention to the long history of government censorship in Brazil. Mesquita worked in Jovem Pan News, Brazilian equivalent to Fox News, but was fired from Jovem Pan News after the events declaring support for the coup de'etat in 2023 Brazilian Congress attack.

== Family ==
Mesquita was born into Brazil's most prominent family of journalists; his forebears were strongly anti-communist and anti-fascist and outspokenly opposed to government censorship against themselves, in favour of it when it affected their enemies. His father, Ruy Mesquita, who died in 2013, was a lawyer “with deep liberal convictions” with right wing tendencies who became the publisher of the family's newspaper, O Estado de S.Paulo, after the death in 1996 of his, Ruy's, older brother Júlio de Mesquita Neto. Júlio has been credited with “almost single-handedly leading the successful battle against censorship” in Brazil; Ruy, for his part, was deeply involved in the late 20th-century struggle to make Brazil a stable democracy and a world power. In 1967, after the country's military rulers violated human rights and broke their promise to hold elections, Ruy and Júlio became leading voices in the opposition to military rule and the fight against government censorship.

Fernão's paternal grandfather, Julio Mesquita Filho, and great-grandfather were also prominent journalists for O Estado; both have been described as having played a major role in shaping “the institutions of the Brazilian oligarchy.” In a talk delivered at the Oslo Freedom Forum in 2011, Fernão Lara Mesquita pointed out that O Estado “was born when Brazil was still a monarchy,” and that his ancestors, who founded it and, as of 2011, had been publishing it for 136 years, had “fought for the end of slavery and for the republic.” Over the generations, noted Fernão, members of his family had been “fighting all kinds of govts and dictators,” resulting in the arrest of his grandfather on 17 occasions, the appropriation of the newspaper, the invasion of its offices by military forces, and the bombing of those offices by terrorists of both the left and right.

== Education ==
Fernão Lara Mesquita studied at the Universidade de São Paulo from 1970 to 1974, receiving degrees in philosophy and education.

== Career ==
Mesquita was editorial director of Jornal da Tarde from 1989 to 2003, and editorial director of the opinion page of O Estado de S. Paulo from 1998 to 2003. He was on the board of directors of Grupo Estado from 2003 to 2011. He was president of Greenpeace Brasil in 2005-6. Since 2003, he has served on the board of directors of O Estado de São Paulo, in addition to working as a journalist for that newspaper.

== Political views ==
In his 2011 Oslo speech, Mesquita lamented that Latin America was “maybe in the lowest point in a decade on freedom of speech.” Presenting a vision of gradual improvement over time, despite ups and downs along the way, he said: “I'm not sure still if my son will be able to live in a full democracy, but he will not pay the price my grandfather paid....it's a long and winding road, but it will get to an end.” He also expressed concern about the Brazilian economy, observing that the free market in his country had been negatively affected by the impact of “Chinese state capitalism,” pressure from which had contributed to the formation of monopolistic conglomerates. Mesquita added that he did not share the enthusiasm of many participants in the Oslo Freedom Forum for the potential of new technologies as tools for freedom, warning that they can also serve as tools of repression.

In a June 2014 article, Mesquita accused Brazilian president Dilma Rousseff of engineering a “coup against democracy” and charged the media with taking an “ostrich attitude” toward her actions. Her “coup,” he stated, took the form of Decree No. 8243, which, by establishing a so-called “National System of Social Participation,” essentially proclaimed that Brazilian civil society would henceforth consist not of all Brazilians but of “an undefined group of 'social movements'” that would apparently enjoy special power not granted to them by either the constitution or the electorate.

In October 2014, Mesquita was photographed holding a sign written "Fuck Venezuela" in a pro-Aécio Neves rally. Venezuela, along with Cuba, was a frequent target of reactionary slogans targeted at the Brazilian left both on right-wing public demonstrations and social media.

He openly supported Jair Bolsonaro presidency, downplaying his threats to Brazilian institutions while criticizing the press coverage of his government, calling for his re-election in 2022 Brazilian general election and downplaying the ex-president responsibility on 2023 Brazilian Congress attack, suggesting it was a planned event to consolidate the Luiz Inácio Lula da Silva presidency.

== Film ==
Mesquita wrote the screenplay for the 2007 “investigative film,” Atlantic Forest and the Cycles of Life (Mata Atlântica e os Ciclos da Vida), which examines the ecosystem of the Atlantic Forest.
