= National Library of Portugal =

Library in Lisbon, Portugal

- Biblioteca Nacional de Portugal
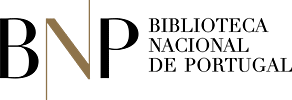

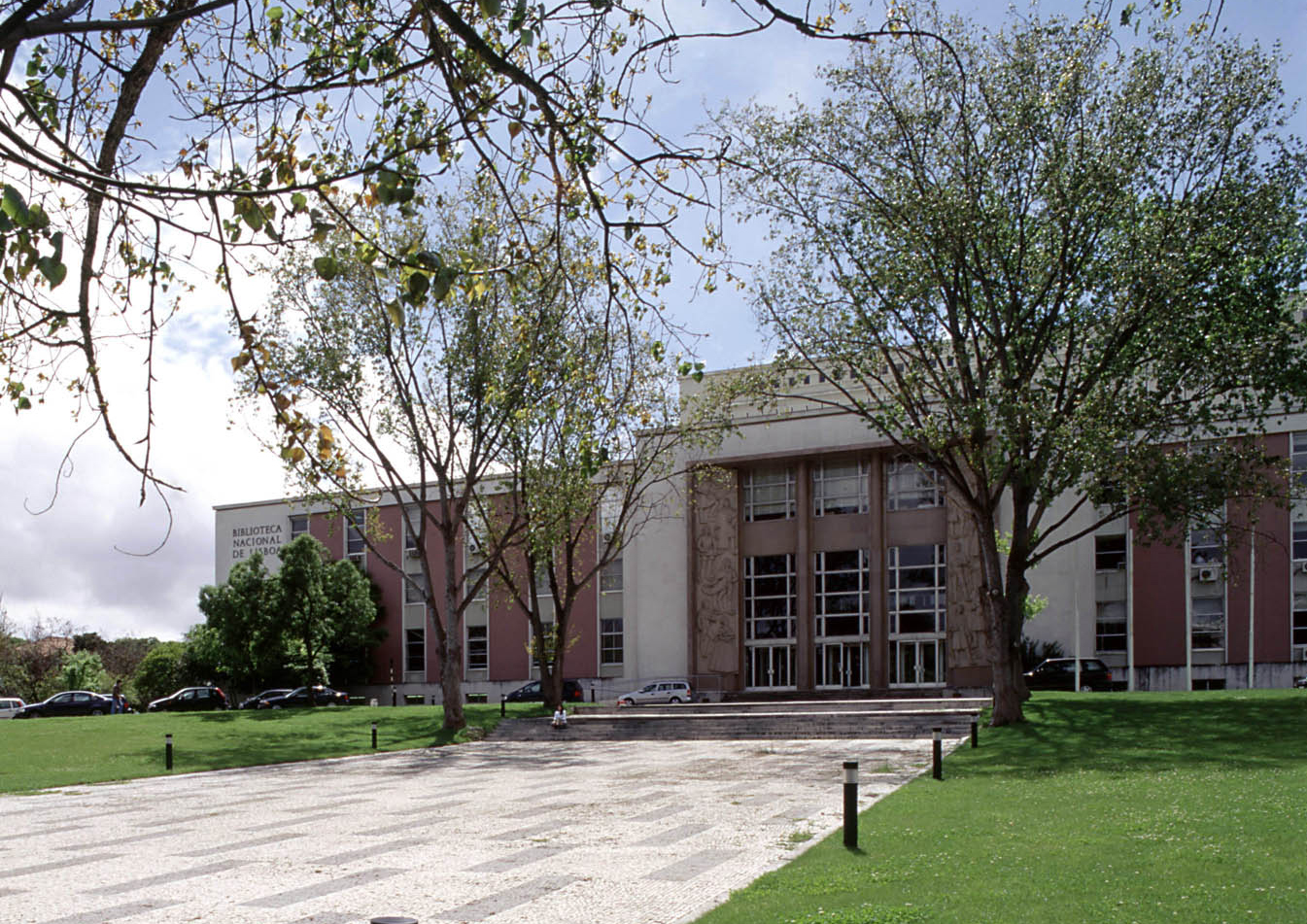
- 38°45′4.17″N 9°9′7.89″W
- Location: Lisbon, Portugal
- Type: National library
- Established: February 29, 1796 (230 years ago)
- Reference to legal mandate: Lei Orgânica da BNP

Collection
- Size: 3 million
- Legal deposit: yes

Access and use
- Access requirements: Readers must be over 18 years of age, and have a "Cartão do leitor" (reader's card)
- Population served: 564 657 (Lisbon)

Other information
- Director: Inês Cordeiro
- Website: http://www.bnportugal.gov.pt/

The National Library of Portugal (Portuguese: Biblioteca Nacional de Portugal) is the Portuguese national library.

== History ==
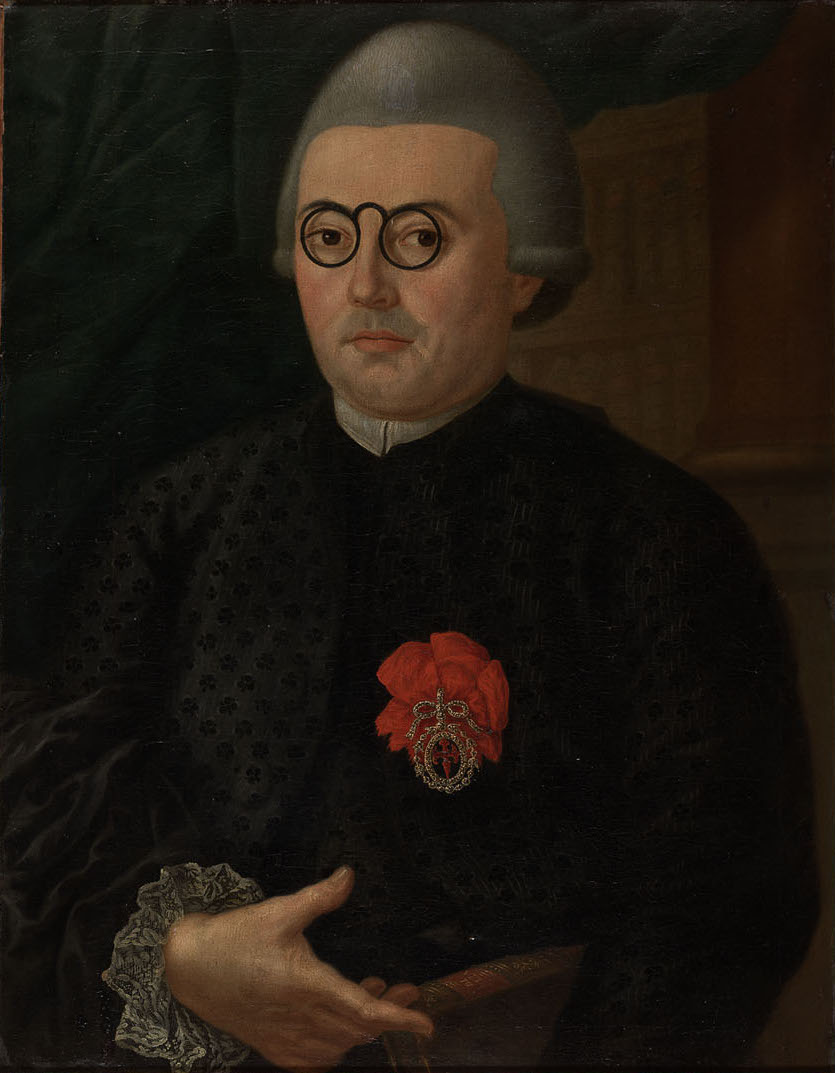
António Ribeiro dos Santos, the first director of the library.

The library was created by Decree of 29 February 1796, under the name of Royal Public Library of the Court (Portuguese: Real Biblioteca Pública da Corte). The library's objective was to allow the general public access to the court's collections, bucking the trend of the time, when only scholars and sages had access to the treasures, manuscripts, paintings, and books of the royal court.

In the dawn of the victory of the Liberals following the Portuguese Civil War and the abolition of the religious orders (1834), the institution was renamed the National Library of Lisbon and was officially entrusted with all or part of the libraries of numerous monasteries and convents. The arrival of these large collections made it necessary to move to larger premises, and the choice fell on the Convento de São Francisco.

Over the more than 130 years in which it operated in the Chiado area of Lisbon, the BNL experienced periods of modernisation and enrichment and times of greyness and lethargy. We should particularly note the efforts that were made in the 19th century to absorb the collections of the abolished religious establishments, organise bibliographic exhibitions and publish catalogues of a variety of collections.

The proclamation of the Republic (1910) was followed by the incorporation of a new wave of libraries from another round of abolitions of religious institutions. Between 1920 and 1926 the BNL enjoyed a phase in which it took a major step forward in the field of library and information science and benefited from a flourishing cultural life, all of which was promoted by the so-called “Library Group”.

The growth of the collections and the need for conditions suited to the conservation of the Library's rich holdings made it indispensable to construct a purpose-designed building that would provide the largest Portuguese bibliographic collection with a proper home. Work began in 1958, to a design by the architect Porfírio Pardal Monteiro, and the Library was transferred to the new building in the Campo Grande area in 1969.

The process of computerising the Library began in the 1980s, alongside a broader project intended to support all of Portugal's libraries in this respect, which resulted in the creation of the National Bibliographic Database – PORBASE. At the same time as it adapted to the process of technological evolution, the Library continued to enrich its collections. Of particular significance was the creation of an Archive of Writers’ Personal Papers, but a number of major initiatives were also undertaken with regard to the standardisation of library and information techniques, preservation and conservation, and cultural activities.

At the beginning of this century the Library has been accompanying the international trend towards the digitisation of bibliographic collections, with the creation of the Biblioteca Nacional Digital (National Digital Library, BND), which is constantly growing and works closely with other European institutions.

Already more than 200 years old, in 2007 the Institution was renamed the National Library of Portugal (BNP) and began a restructuring process that is seeking to help both enrich and publicise the nation's bibliographic heritage, and to modernise, rationalise and improve its own operations in such a way as to serve the public, the professional community, and publishers and booksellers.

== Mission and activities ==
The BNP's mission is to collect, process and preserve the Portuguese documentary heritage, including documents in Portuguese and about Portugal, whatever their format or carrier. It is also charged with studying and disseminating that heritage and ensuring the conditions which people need in order to be able to enjoy it, as well as classifying and inventorying the nation's bibliographic heritage assets.

Under this definition, which is set out in the Organic Law governing the BNP, the Library continues to pursue the essence of the fundamental purposes and objectives for which it was created in 1796, but is also responsible for the provision of a more varied range of services to both Portuguese culture and the public in general – among other ways, via the Online Catalogue of our collections and the Digital National Library – and the professionals in the publishing and information and documentation sectors.

To this end the BNP acts as the National Bibliographic Agency, which is responsible for the mandatory legal deposit of publications and the country's ISSN, ISMN and CIP (Cataloguing in Publication) services, the recording and dissemination of the Portuguese National Bibliography, and the coordination and management of PORBASE – the National Bibliographic Database. In this respect it has also undertaken a variety of actions that help to promote the professional development of libraries, in conjunction with its role as the body with responsibility for national standards concerning documentation and information in Portugal.

Protecting and enhancing the country's bibliographic heritage are another two fundamental aspects of the BNP's mission, in its dual role as the entity that is responsible for preserving and controlling that heritage and the keeper of Portugal's largest collection of bibliographic treasures. It is also charged with studying and publicising the latter in Portugal and abroad, which is accomplished by means of a range of projects involving inter-institutional cooperation, exhibitions, research activities and publications.

== Collections ==
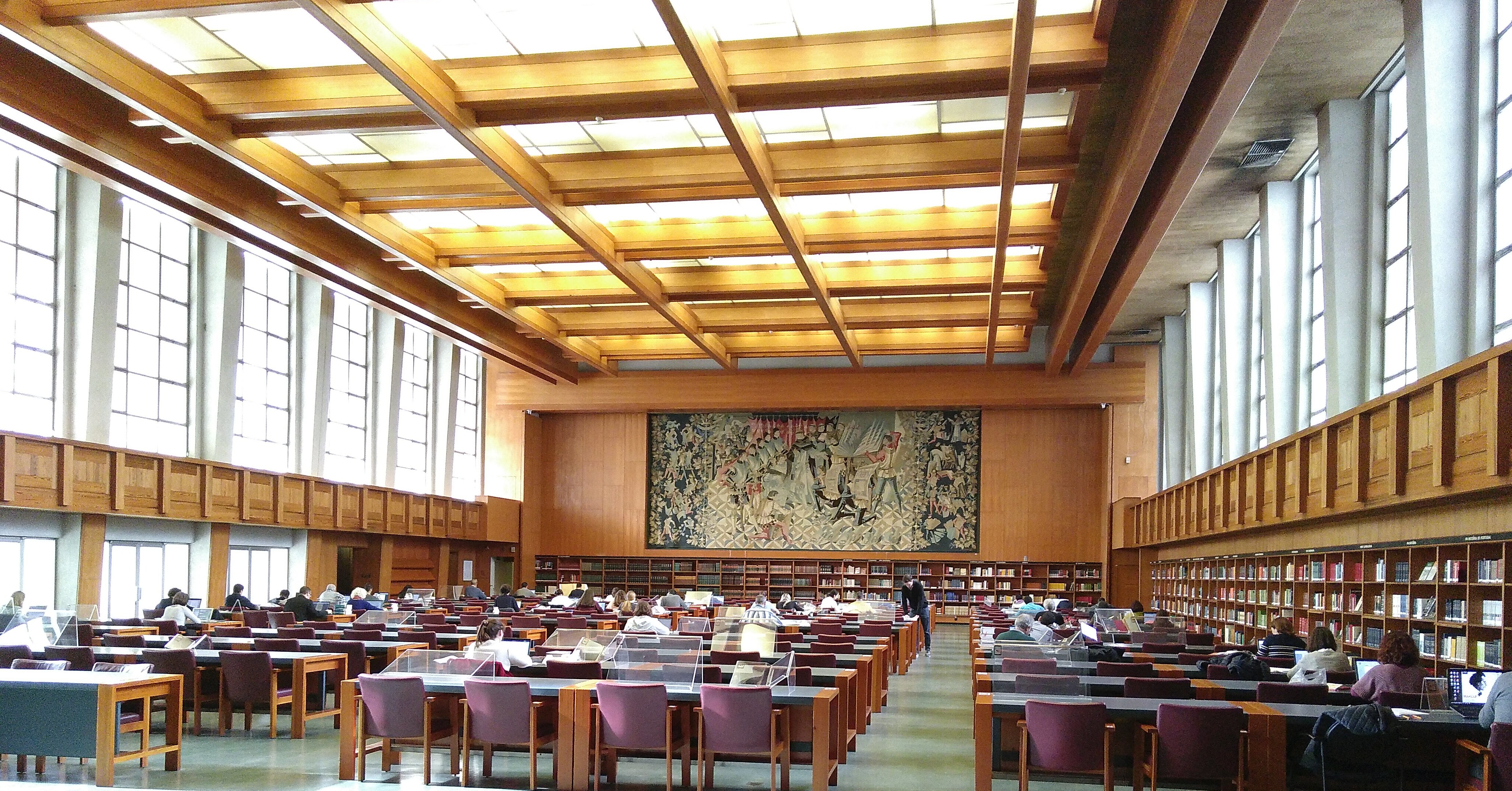
Reading room (November 2019)

The National Library of Portugal is the largest library in the country and a prestigious institution on the cultural scene. It collects, processes and preserves the nation's bibliographic heritage and makes it available to the intellectual and scientific community.

The National Library of Portugal has a wide variety of collections that encompass documentation from every era, of every type and on every subject. A combination of the legal deposit system, acquisitions and donations mean that the holdings are constantly evolving. A special emphasis is placed on Portuguese works.

=== General collection ===
The General Collection is the BNP's largest, with more than 3 million items, most of which are Portuguese publications. It covers the period from the 16th to the 21st centuries. Initially composed of the holdings of the Library of the Royal Board of Censorship and the libraries of convents that were abolished in 1834, the collection is divided into sections of monographs by major topic, a set of special collections that have been donated to us over the years, and a huge collection of 50,000 Portuguese periodical titles and around 240 foreign ones. The General Collection systematically contains everything that has been published in Portugal and provided to the Library under the Legal Deposit system since 1931. It also includes the theses and other academic works produced at Portugal's universities, which have also been subject to mandatory legal deposit since 1986.

=== Rare Books and Manuscripts ===
The various collections that we generically term "Rare books and manuscripts" encompass the most valuable and important heritage assets in the BNP's holdings. The collection of Manuscripts is currently actually made up of six collections, with library and archive documents of various genres and types and with a wide range of origins, from the 12th century to the present day. The overall collection contains a total of around 15,000 codices and 36,000 sundry manuscripts. The collection of rare Printed Books is made up of a selection of works whose rarity, age or publishing characteristics earn them a place in the BNP's "Valuable Reserve" of printed books, which numbers more than 30,000 items. There are two main sections, which are divided on the basis of age: up until 1500 (Incunabula); and printed since 1501 (Rare books). They also have a number of other collections, which are grouped on the basis of a number of different criteria, such as subject, printer, or special characteristics. The Historical Archive contains archive documents from a variety of sources, with an emphasis on personal and family archives. The oldest documents date from the 11th century. In total there are around 466 separate collections (or parts of collection). The BNP's own Historical Archive is included under this heading. The Archive of Contemporary Portuguese Culture (ACPC) is currently home to the collections of personal papers of 148 writers and other figures from the 19th and 20th centuries. Leading names include Fernando Pessoa, Eça de Queirós, Camilo Castelo Branco, Camilo Pessanha, Antero de Quental, Oliveira Martins, Jaime Cortesão, Raul Proença, Vitorino Nemésio, Vergílio Ferreira and José Saramago, among others.

=== Cartography ===
The Cartography collection holds around 6,800 titles composed of both printed and manuscript atlases, maps and plans that have been made and/or published since the 16th century. Although the collection includes cartographic representations of every part of the world, the majority of the items portray Portugal and its former overseas domains.

=== Iconography ===
The Iconographic collections contain around 117,000 images on paper and have constituted a specialised section of the Library since 1976. They were originally formed from three initial collections that belonged to the Rare Books and Manuscripts Division (Prints, Drawings, and Religious Pictures), but were organised into a separate collection when the Library became fully aware of their importance to the study of history, sociology, art and so on, and came to recognise their heritage value.

=== Music ===
The BNP's Music Collection is one of the most important in Portugal, and is especially useful for historical and musicological research. It contains more than 50,000 items ranging from the 12th to the 20th centuries, most of which were produced in Portugal. In addition to printed and manuscript scores, it offers books and periodicals on musical subjects, librettos, programmes, posters, photographs, a variety of personal and institutional archives and other material linked to the production of music and musical recordings.

=== Reading for the Visually Impaired ===
The reading service for the Visually Impaired has held and produced works in Braille and audio books since 1969. The service uses the paper, magnetic tape and digital formats. It has more than 7,000 items in Braille, including 4,000 musical works, and 1,575 audio titles.

== See also ==
- Torre do Tombo National Archive
- List of libraries in Portugal
- Open access in Portugal
