= University of Lisbon =

Public research university in Portugal

- Universidade de Lisboa
- Motto: Ad Lucem (Latin)
- Motto in English: To the light
- Type: Public research university
- Established: 1911 (University of Lisbon); 1930 (Technical University of Lisbon); 2013 (merger of previous University of Lisbon with Technical University of Lisbon)
- Affiliations: Port-City University League; Compostela Group of Universities; Conférence des Grandes Écoles; UNICA; Transatlantic Policy Consortium (TPC)
- Rector: Luís Ferreira
- Faculty: 3,369 (2018)
- Administrative staff: 2,106 (2018)
- Students: 47,794 (2018–19)
- Undergraduates: 35,063 (2018–19)
- Postgraduates: 12,731 (2018–19)
- Location: Lisbon, Portugal
- Campus: several locations, Lisbon metropolitan area
- Colours: Black and white (University; rectory)
- Website: ulisboa.pt

The University of Lisbon (ULisboa; Portuguese: Universidade de Lisboa) is a public research university in Lisbon, and Portugal's largest university. After its initial foundation as a studium generale in 1290 moved to Coimbra in the 16th century, its first modern iteration was founded in 1911. The university's present structure dates to the 2013 merger of the former University of Lisbon (1911–2013) and the Technical University of Lisbon (1930–2013).

== History ==
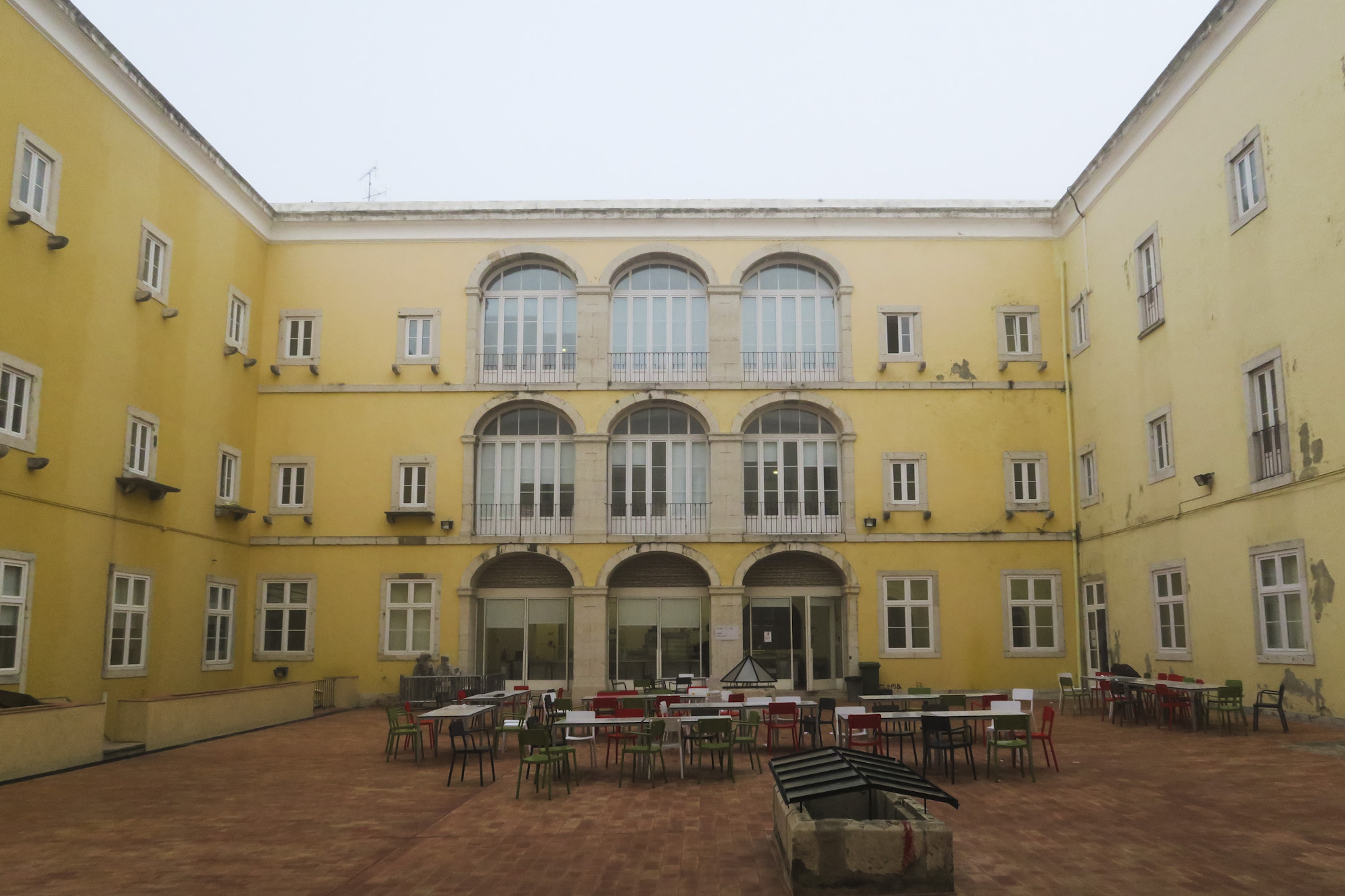
The faculty of fine arts.

University of Coimbra, the first Portuguese university, was established in Lisbon between 1288 and 1290, when Dinis I promulgated the letter Scientiae thesaurus mirabilis, granting several privileges to the students of the studium generale in Lisbon (apud Ulixbonensem civitatem regiam). There was an active participation in this educational activity by the Portuguese Crown and its king, through its commitment of part of the subsidy of the same, as by the fixed incomes of the Church. This institution moved several times between Lisbon and Coimbra, where it settled permanently in 1537.

From the late 18th century onwards, higher education studies were carried out in Lisbon through several "Courses", schools and institutes. The current University of Lisbon is the result of the merger of two former public universities of Lisbon, the former University of Lisbon, founded in 1911 and the Technical University of Lisbon, founded in 1930. The merger process was initiated in 2011 and was made into law on 31 December 2012. As stated on the decree-law No. 266-E/2012, the new University of Lisbon began its legal existence on the day the newly elected rector took office, on 25 July 2013.

=== Predecessors ===
- University of Lisbon (1911–2013)
- Technical University of Lisbon (1930–2013)

== Organization ==
As of 2025, the University of Lisbon comprises nineteen schools, of which eighteen are universitary and one is polytechnic:

- Faculdade de Arquitetura (FA) - School of Architecture
- Faculdade de Belas-Artes (FBA) - School of Fine Arts
- Faculdade de Ciências (FC) - School of Sciences
- Faculdade de Direito (FD) - School of Law
- Faculdade de Farmácia (FF) - School of Pharmacy
- Faculdade de Letras (FL) - School of Letters
- Faculdade de Medicina (FM) - School of Medicine
- Faculdade de Medicina Dentária (FMD) - School of Dental Medicine
- Faculdade de Medicina Veterinária (FMV) - School of Veterinary Medicine
- Faculdade de Motricidade Humana (FMH) - School of Human Motricity
- Faculdade de Psicologia (FP) - School of Psychology
- Instituto de Ciências Sociais (ICS) - Institute of Social Sciences
- Instituto de Educação (IE) - Institute of Education
- Instituto de Geografia e Ordenamento do Território (IGOT) - Institute of Geography and Territorial Planning
- Instituto Superior de Agronomia (ISA) - School of Agronomy
- Instituto Superior de Ciências Sociais e Políticas (ISCSP) - School of Social and Political Sciences
- Instituto Superior de Economia e Gestão (ISEG) - School of Economics and Management
- Instituto Superior Técnico (IST) - School of Engineering
- Escola Superior de Enfermagem de Lisboa (ESEL) - School of Nursing (polytechnic system)

It also comprises six specialized units, social and shared services, and the Lisbon University Stadium.

Locations of the University of Lisbon campi, schools and facilities.
Beyond the map scope lies the Instituto Superior Técnico TagusPark Campus, some 14km (8.7 mi) from its main campus in Alameda

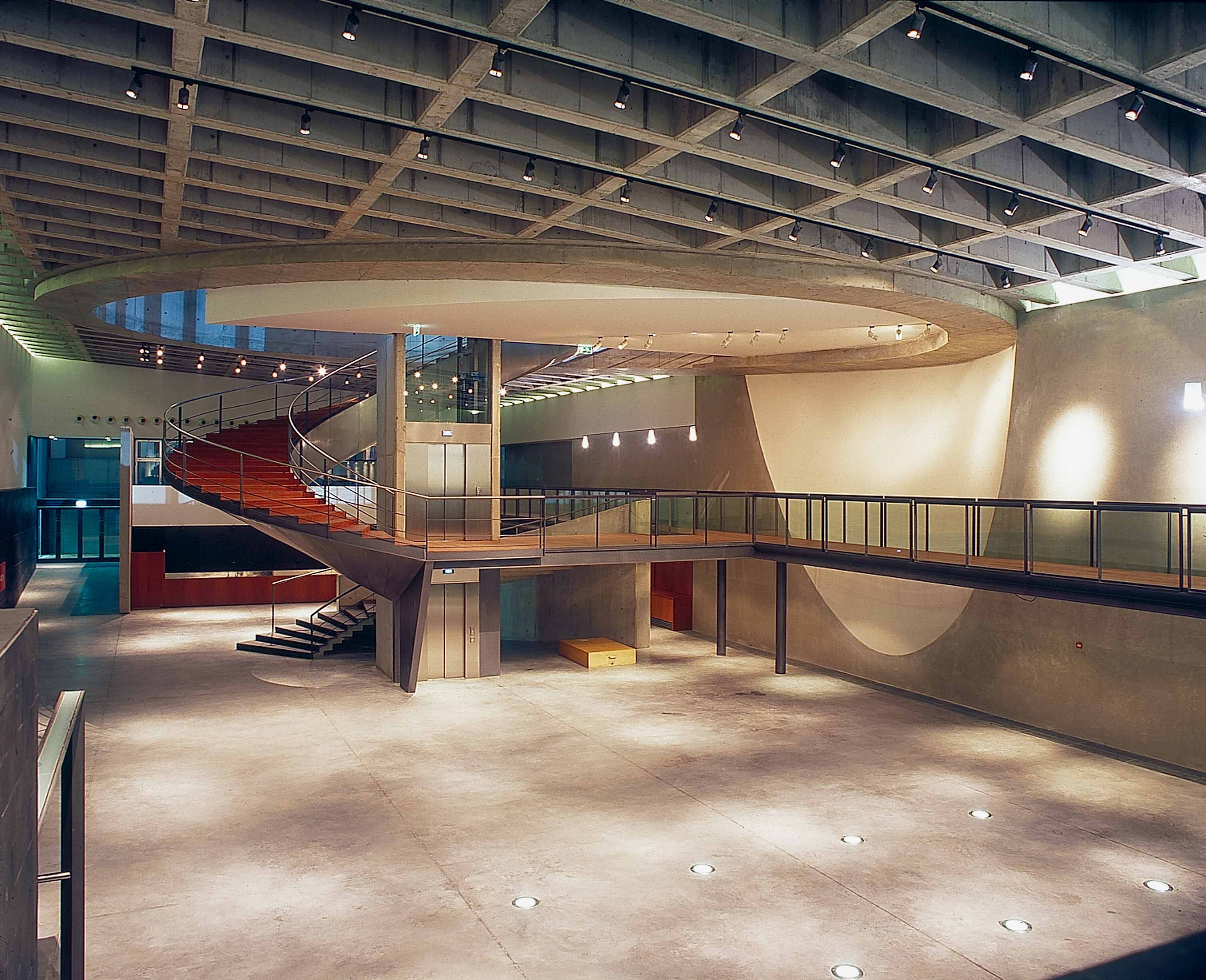
School of Dentistry

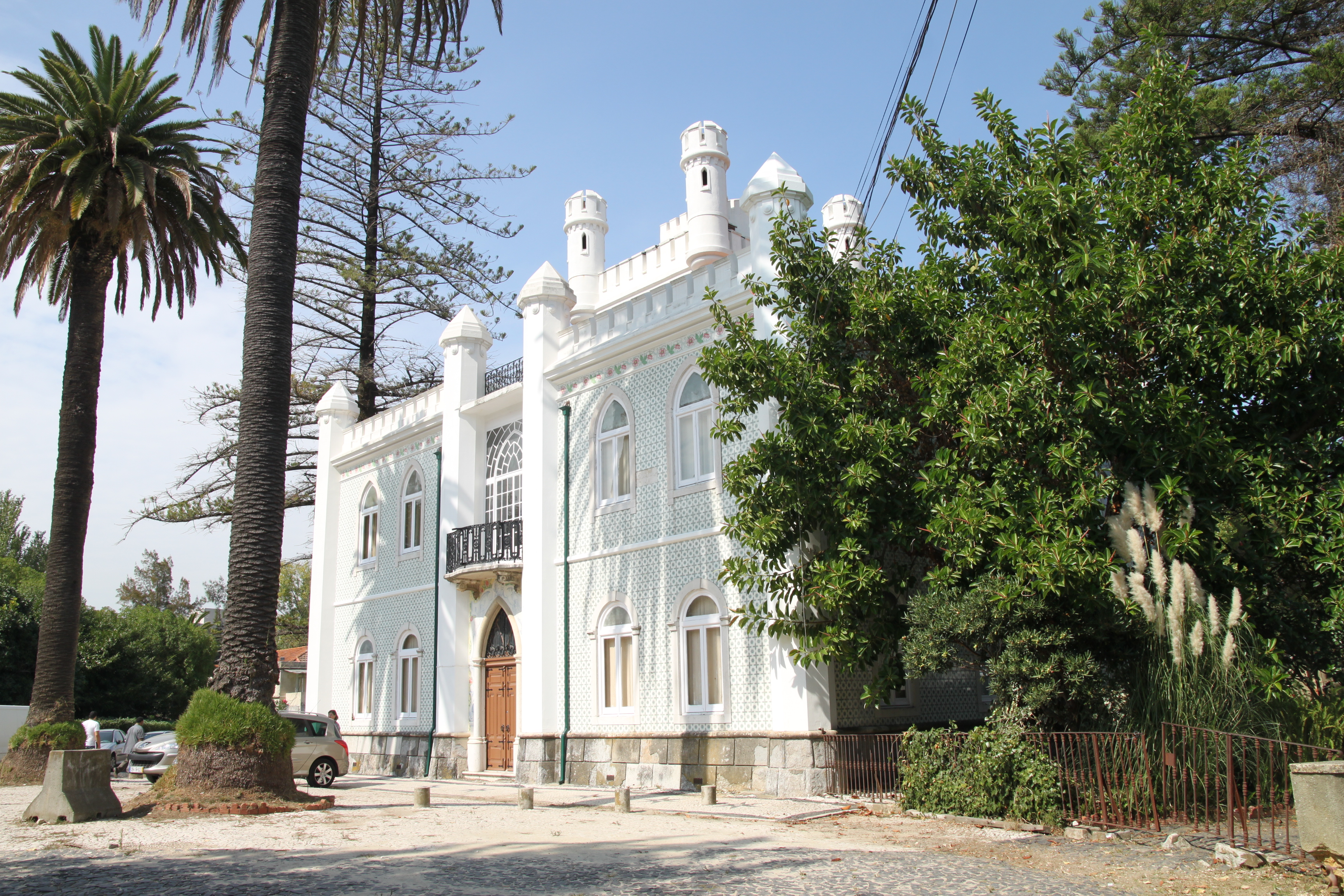
The Quinta da Torrinha building, nicknamed Castelinho ("Little Castle"), part of the School of Pharmacy

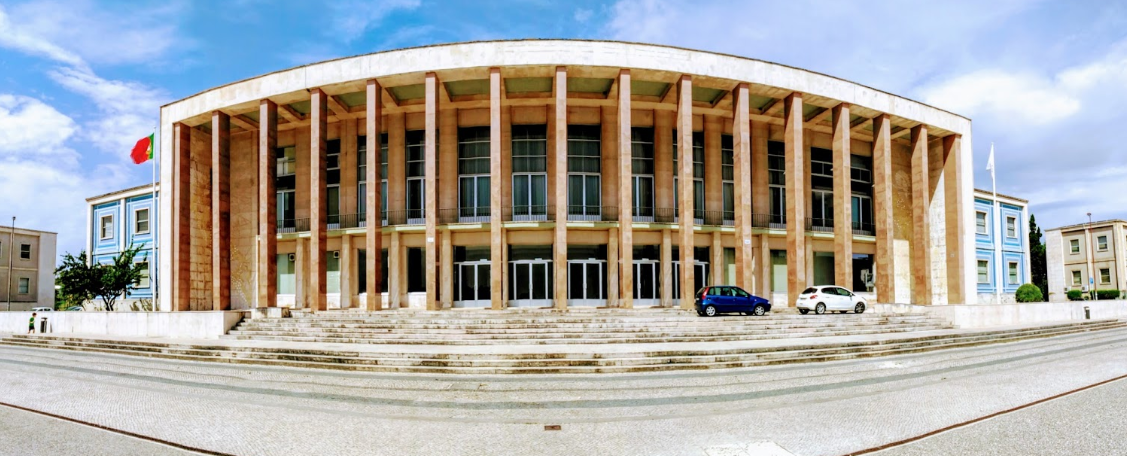
Panoramic of the Rectory of Lisbon

== Journal ==
The Botanical Garden of the University of Lisbon publishes Portugaliae Acta Biologica, a biannual peer-reviewed scientific journal covering research in all areas of botany especially of Iberian and Macaronesian cryptogams. It was established in 1944. Until 1999, the journal was published in two separate series, A and B, the first dedicated to morphology, physiology, and general biology, and the second to systematics, ecology, biogeography, and paleontology. The editors-in-chief are Amélia Martins-Loução, Fernando Catarino, and Ireneia Melo.

The Botanical Garden also publishes Revista de Biologia, a biannual peer-reviewed scientific journal covering research in biology, especially mediterranean and tropical ecology. It was established in 1956. Until 1974, the journal was published jointly by the Botanical Gardens of Rio de Janeiro, Lisbon, Dundo, and Lourenço Marques. The editors-in-chief are Amélia Martins-Loução, Fernando Catarino, and Ireneia Melo.

== Rankings ==
University rankings

Global – Overall
- ARWU World: 201–300 (2023)
- QS World: =230 (2026)
- THE World: 401–500 (2024)
- USNWR Global: 202 (2023)

According to the Academic Ranking of World Universities 2017, also known as Shanghai Ranking, the University of Lisbon is ranked first in Portugal and 151–200 (overall) in the world. In the broad subject field of Engineering/Technology and Computer Sciences the university is ranked 51–75 worldwide, while in the disciplines of Mathematics, Physics and Computer Science it is ranked 101–150, 151–200 and 151–200, respectively.

In the Times Higher Education World University Rankings (THE) 2017 the University of Lisbon is regarded as the largest university in Portugal and is ranked 401–500 (overall), while in the QS World University Rankings 2018 it is ranked 305 (overall).

== Notable people ==
=== Humanities ===
==== History ====
- Hermenegildo Fernandes
- José Hermano Saraiva
- José Mattoso
- José Eduardo Franco

==== Literature ====
- David Mourão-Ferreira
- Fernando Pessoa
- Florbela Espanca
- Herberto Hélder
- José Rodrigues Miguéis
- Lídia Jorge
- Maria Judite de Carvalho
- Pepetela
- Raul Mesquita
- Sophia de Mello Breyner
- Urbano Tavares Rodrigues
- Vitorino Nemésio

==== Law ====
- Isabel de Magalhães Colaço
- Ana Maria Guerra Martins
- Aurora Rodrigues

==== Fine Arts ====
- Bordalo II

=== Sciences ===
- Egas Moniz
- António Damásio
- Renata Basto
- Sara Benoliel
- Maria Manuela Chaves
- Maria do Carmo Fonseca
- Sofia Mensurado
- Isabel Ribeiro

=== Business ===
- António de Sommer Champalimaud
- Alexandre Soares dos Santos
- David Cristina
- Luis Valadares Tavares

=== Politics ===
==== Heads of state and government ====
- Agostinho Neto
- Jorge Sampaio
- Mário Soares
- Pedro Pires
- Teófilo Braga
- Jorge Carlos Fonseca
- Cavaco Silva
- Marcelo Rebelo de Sousa
- Afonso Costa
- Adelino da Palma Carlos
- Francisco Pinto Balsemão
- Marcelo Caetano
- Diogo Freitas do Amaral
- António Costa
- Graça Machel

==== Leaders of international organizations ====
- José Manuel Durão Barroso
- Vítor Constâncio
- António Guterres
- Mário Centeno

== Lisbon University Student's Union ==
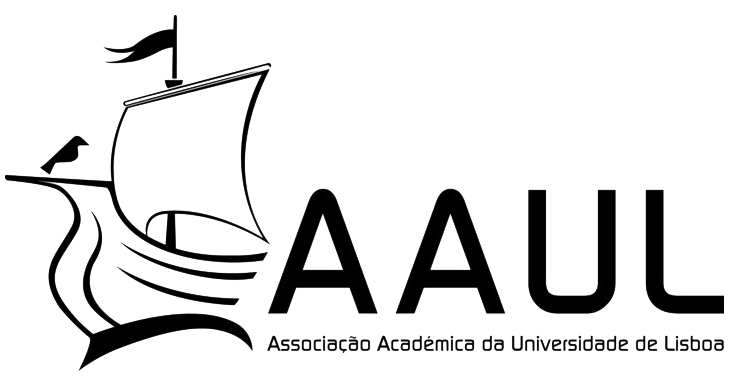
AAUL Logo

The Associação Académica da Universidade de Lisboa, founded on 8 March 2007, is the representative structure of the collective interests of all students of the University of Lisbon.

The AAUL is an Association with a Federative character, recognized by the Government as a Federation of Students balancing a model of direct election by students with the pursuit of the institutional interests of the Federated Academic and Student Associations themselves.

Within the Associação Académica da Universidade de Lisboa, the paradigm of two chambers, personified by the General Assembly and the General Council, finds parallels in the upper and lower chambers of bicameral parliamentary systems. The term upper chamber is particularly relevant when analyzing the structure and function of these bodies in the context of the AAUL.

The General Council of the AAUL emerges as the representative body of the Student Associations and the students of the Faculties, playing an essential role in defining the programmatic lines of AAUL activity. The representativeness of these associations and faculties in the General Council reflects the diversity of interests and perspectives, providing a more comprehensive and institutionalized view.

On the other hand, the General Assembly, resembling a lower chamber, represents all students of the University of Lisbon. This is the highest point of deliberation, where all students exercise a direct voice in decision-making on matters related to the AAUL. The direct participation of students in the General Assembly reflects the popular and democratic nature of this chamber, contrasting with the more institutional character of the General Council.

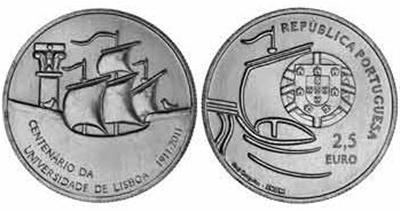
2.5 Euro coin commemorating the 100 years of ULisboa with the emblem of AAUL

This bicameral structure, similar to parliamentary systems in various parts of the world, finds echoes in examples such as the Council of the European Union and the European Parliament, reflecting the specific nuances of the European Union. Similarly, in the United States, the Senate represents the member states in a federative manner, while the House of Representatives directly reflects the voice of the citizens. In the United Kingdom, the House of Lords, with an aristocratic character, contrasts with the House of Commons, representing the general population. This diversity of examples highlights the adaptability and effectiveness of the bicameral model in managing different perspectives and interests, ensuring a more inclusive and representative approach in decisions relevant to the student community of the University of Lisbon.

== See also ==
- List of universities in Portugal
- Higher education in Portugal
- Flora-On
