= Renata Basto =

Researcher

Renata Homem de Gouveia Xavier de Basto is a researcher in cell and developmental biology. She is currently a team leader at the Institut Curie in Paris. She is also the deputy director of the CNRS research Unit UMR144 'Cell biology and cancer' at the Institut Curie which, comprises 14 research teams.

== Education and academic appointments ==
Renata Basto was born on December 17, 1972, in Mozambique. She did her undergraduate studies in biology and genetics at the University of Lisbon in Portugal. She then did her PhD in the lab of Roger Karess in Paris. In 2002, she joined the laboratory of Jordan Raff in Cambridge (UK) to do her postdoctoral studies. In 2007, she was recruited at the CNRS and started her own research team in 2008 at the Institut Curie. In addition to running her own research group, she became the deputy director of the research Unit UMR144 'Cell biology and cancer'.

== Research ==
During her PhD, Renata Basto studied the control of the transition from metaphase to anaphase in Drosophila.

During her postdoc in the lab of Jordan Raff, Renata Basto investigated the role of centrioles in flies during development. Her work led to two publications in the highly recognized journal Cell, which have been cited more than 600 and 400 times respectively since publication.

With her team she continued investigating the biology of centrosomes and the consequences of genetic instabilities. She has published research on centrosome biology and has also investigated the role of aneuploidy, polyploidy and genetic instability.

She is considered a reference in the field of centrosomes biology and has edited a book about methods to study cilia and flagella. She is the author of 58 publications and has been cited 1,929 times.

== Awards ==
- 2009 – ERC starting grant
- 2016 – ERC consolidator grant
