= Flora-On =

Flora-On is a portal coordinated by the Portuguese Botanical Society containing photographic, geographical, morphological and ecological information for all vascular plant species in Portugal (both in the mainland, Azores and Madeira).

The portal was created in 2012 by a group of young biologists within the Faculty of Sciences of the University of Lisbon and has been in constant development since. Work is voluntarily done by botanists, naturalists and researchers. The project does not depend on or receive funding from any institution or company and is purely based on volunteer work.

The main aim of the project is to provide the specialized and non-specialized public with free, simple and intuitive access to scientific information on plants that occur in Portugal.

Plants are classified through various criteria: taxa, morfological characteristics, endemism, abundance, time of floration, geographical location (by grid, municipalities, Protected areas, etc...), some by conservation status.

For each species or subspecies, there are bioclimatic graphs that apply hardiness, precipitation, thermicity, altitude, continentality, ombrothermic index, among others. A link to Flora Iberica's article for the designated taxon is also provided for further, in depth morphological description.
