= Mesquita (surname) =

Mesquita is Portuguese and Galician surname meaning "mosque". Notable people with the name include:

- Abraham Bueno de Mesquita, Dutch actor
- Aender Naves Mesquita, Brazilian footballer
- Batja Mesquita, Dutch psychologist
- Beatriz Mesquita, Brazilian Jiu Jitsu competitor
- Bruce Bueno de Mesquita, American political scientist
- Caroline Mesquita, French artist
- Danilo Mesquita, Brazilian actor
- David Bueno de Mesquita, Dutch painter
- Dayenne Mesquita, Brazilian actress
- Elias Mesquita, Timorese footballer
- Fernão Lara Mesquita, Brazilian journalist
- Idalina Mesquita, Brazilian handball player
- Jaqueline Mesquita, Brazilian mathematician
- Jerônima Mesquita, Brazilian feminist
- Michel Platini Mesquita, Brazilian footballer
- Pedro Mesquita, Portuguese footballer
- Quintiliano de Mesquita, Brazilian physician and scientist
- Ramon Mesquita, Brazilian footballer
- Raul Mesquita, Portuguese author
- Rodrigo Paixão Mesquita, Brazilian footballer
- Samuel Jessurun de Mesquita, Dutch artist
- Tiago Mesquita, Portuguese footballer
- Vanessa Mesquita, Brazilian model
- Vicente Nicolau de Mesquita, officer of the Portuguese Army in Macau
