= Maxime de la Rochefoucauld =

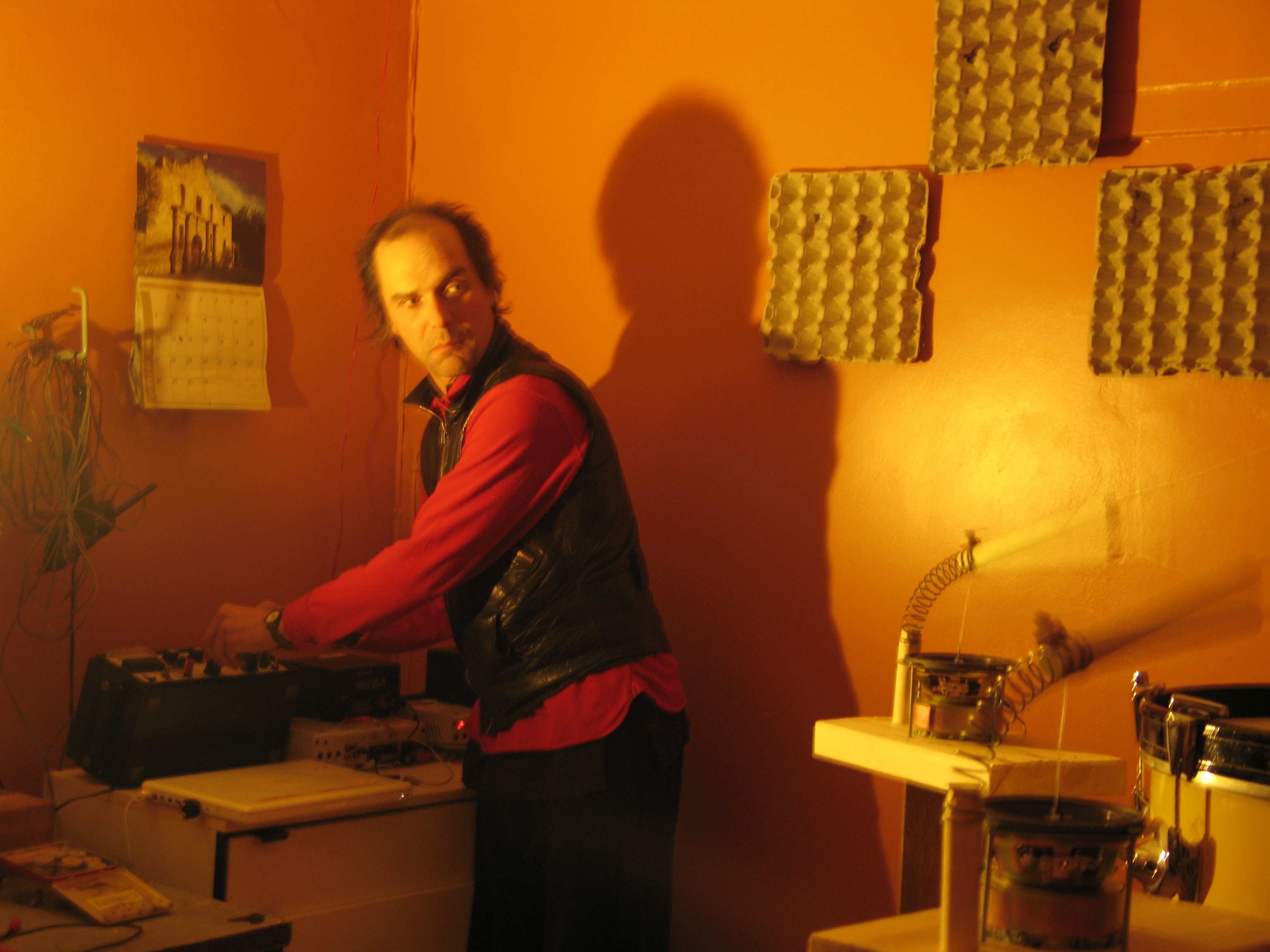
Maxime Rioux in his studio, 2007

Maxime Rioux (born October 29, 1959) known by his stage name Maxime De La Rochefoucauld is a Canadian musician and performance artist based in Montreal, Quebec.

Rioux is best known for his compositions produced on musical instruments that are homemade and often built specifically for a single live performance. Most instruments (usually string or percussion) of his Système Ki, as Rioux calls it, are not played directly by a musician. Instead they are mechanically linked to a woofer that is driven by an inaudible, extremely low frequency electrical signal. The signal, in the range of 1-10 Hz, is most often generated on a synthesizer and prerecorded, but may be played live or be generated from other electrical sources.

The name "Ki" refers to the Japanese translation of Qi, the notion of a vital energy that animates all things.

Rioux is the brother of French-Canadian stage and film actress Geneviève Rioux.

== Discography ==
=== Albums ===
- Automates Ki, Plastique Records, 1997
- Collection Somnambule, Disques Pout Pout, 2002
- Orchestraki, Storyboard Records, 2006
