= O Estado de S. Paulo =

Brazilian daily newspaper

- Type: Daily newspaper
- Format: Berliner
- Owner: Grupo Estado
- Founders: José Maria Lisboa; Francisco Rangel Pestana; Américo Brasílio de Campos
- Editor: João Caminoto
- Founded: 4 January 1875; 151 years ago
- Political alignment: Centre-right; Economic liberalism Liberal conservatism
- Language: Portuguese
- Headquarters: Av. Eng. Caetano Álvares, 55; São Paulo, SP; 02598-900
- Country: Brazil
- Circulation: 520,988 (2024)
- ISSN: 1516-2931
- Website: www.estadao.com.br

O Estado de S. Paulo (Portuguese pronunciation: [u isˈtadu d(ʒi) sɐ̃w ˈpawlu]; lit. 'The State of São Paulo'), also known as Estadão (Portuguese: [istaˈdɐ̃w]; lit. 'Big State'), is a daily newspaper published in São Paulo, Brazil. It is the third largest newspaper in Brazil, and its format changed from broadsheet to Berliner on October 17, 2021.

It has the second-largest circulation in the city of São Paulo, behind only Folha de S. Paulo. The journal was founded on 4 January 1875, and was first called A Província de São Paulo (lit. 'The Province of São Paulo'). O Estado de S. Paulo is described by observers as having a right-wing, conservative editorial stance. It is considered a newspaper of record for Brazil.

== History ==
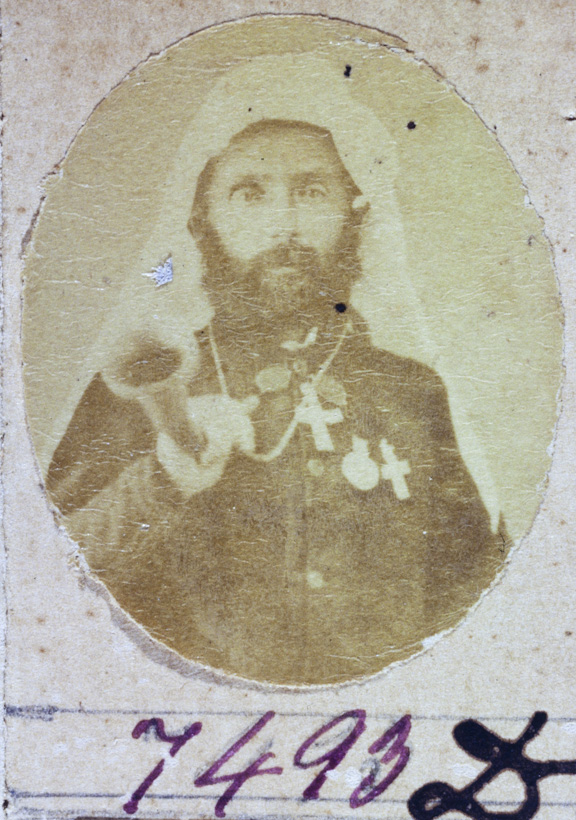
Bernard Gregoire

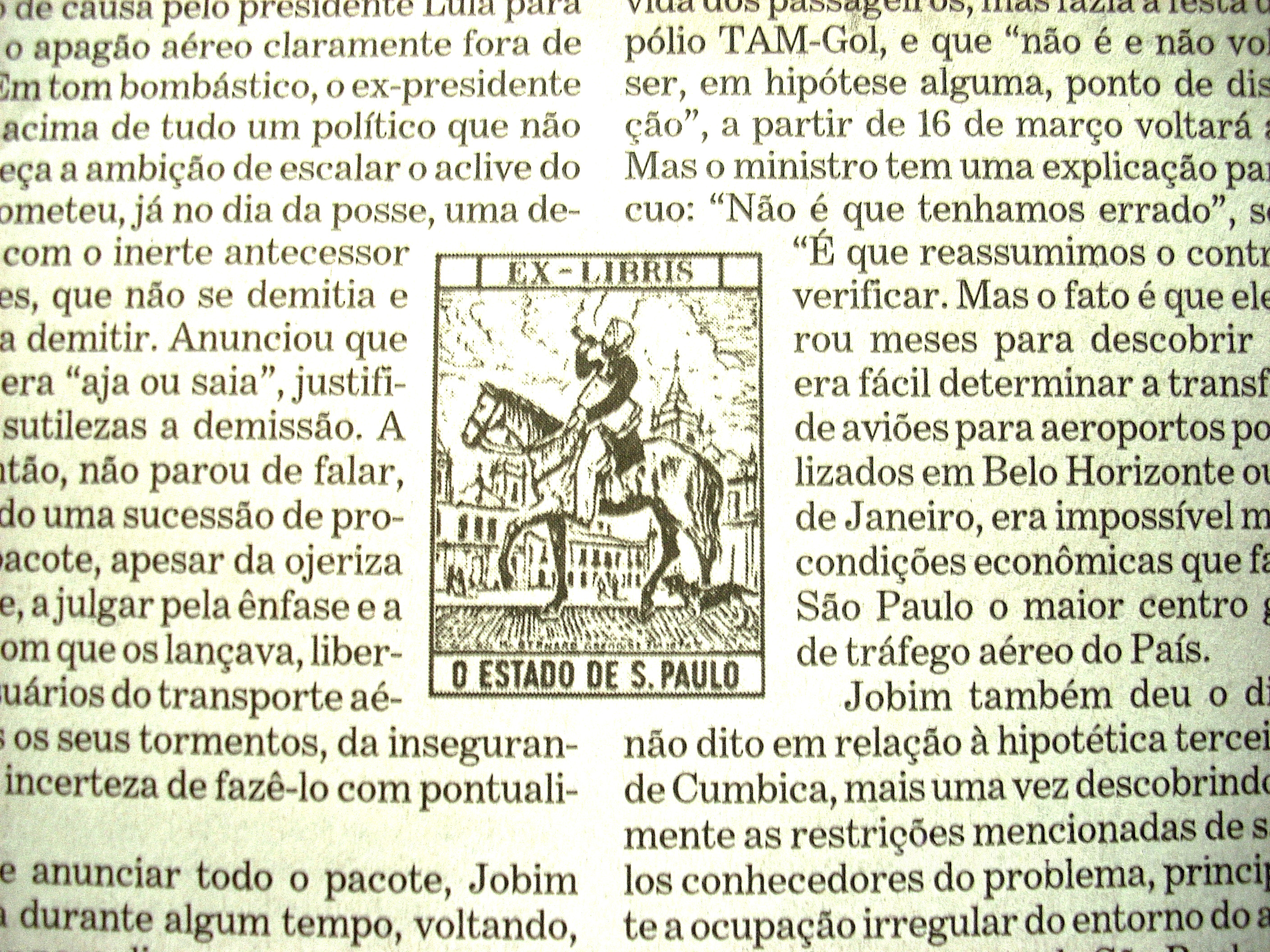
Bernard Gregoire riding a horse and playing a cornet is the symbol of the newspaper

The term Província ("Province") was preserved until January 1890, one month after the fall of the monarchy and the subsequent republican regime in Brazil. Although the newspaper supported the change, it showed that it was completely independent, refusing to serve the interests of the ascendant Republican Party of São Paulo.

When the then editor in chief Francisco Rangel Pestana left to work in a project of the Constitution, in Petrópolis, the young editor Julio de Mesquita effectively took control of Estado and initiated a series of innovations. One of the innovations was the engagement of the agency Havas, once the largest in the world.

The Estadão pioneered the newspaper selling system in 1875, where it was sold on the streets, instead of by the subscription-only system adopted by all other newspapers in Brazil before that time. At first, this new way of selling resulted in jokes and mockery, but ultimately all rivals adopted the same system. Today, newspapers in Brazil are sold in small street newspapers/magazines shops, and by single sellers located in the main avenues of the biggest cities. Back in the 19th century, the Estadão was sold by only one man, a French immigrant, who carried his newspapers in a bag, while riding a horse, and announcing himself with a cornet.

=== 19th century ===
In the end of the 19th century, the Estado was already the largest newspaper in São Paulo, exceeding the circulation of the Correio Paulistano. Property of the Mesquita family since 1902, the Estado supported the Allied cause in World War I, suffering reprisals from the German community in the city, which removed all advertising announcements from the newspaper. Despite this, the Mesquitas maintained their editorial position. During the war, the afternoon edition of the newspaper began to circulate throughout the country. It was known as Estadinho (lit. "Little Estado"), directed by the then young Júlio de Mesquita Filho.

In 1924, the newspaper Estado was banned from circulation for the first time, after the defeat of the tenentist revolt that shook the city. Júlio Mesquita, who tried to mediate a dialogue between the rebels and the government, was imprisoned and taken to Rio de Janeiro, before being freed shortly thereafter.

With the death of the old director of 1927, his son Júlio de Mesquita Filho assumed the directory along with his brother Franscisco, the latter managing the financial aspects of the newspaper. In 1930, the Estado, connected to the Democratic Party, supported the candidature of Getúlio Vargas for the Liberal Alliance. With the victory of Vargas, the newspaper saw the Revolution of 1930 as a mark of the end of the oligarchy system.

The Grupo Estado assumed in 1932 the leadership of the constitutionalist revolution. With its defeat, many people from the directory were exiled, including Júlio de Mesquita Filho and Francisco Mesquita. One year later, in August, Getúlio Vargas invited Armando de Salles Oliveira to be the governor in São Paulo. Armando Salles, son-in-law of Júlio Mesquita (by then already deceased), imposed as a condition for his acceptance the position the amnesty of the rebels of 1932 and a convocation of a constituent assembly. Vargas agreed and Júlio de Mesquita Filho and Francisco Mesquita, as well as other exiled people, returned to Brazil.

Years later, with the appearance of the "Estado Novo", the newspaper maintained its opposition to the regime, and in March 1940 it was invaded by DOPS (part of the government that controlled and restrained opponents and movements that were antithetical to the Estado Novo regime) and the paper was altered by them to state that, with absurdity and mockery, "guns were arrested" in the redaction. The newspaper was initially closed and afterwards was confiscated by the dictatorship, being administrated by DIP (Department of the Press [Port."Imprense"] and Propaganda) until 1945, when the Estado was returned by the Supreme Federal Court to its legitimate owners. The numbers published during this governmental intervention are not considered part of the actual history of the paper.

Shortly after World War II the Estado enjoyed great advances, with the increase in editing and of its good reputation. In the 1950s, the Major Quedinho Street headquarters were built, adjacent to the Hotel Jaraguá. That was the phase when the section Internacional ("International") of the newspaper, directed by the journalist Giannino Carta and by Ruy Mesquita, became known as the most complete of any national newspaper. From that time until the 1970s, O Estado showed almost exclusively international news on its first page.

=== República Nova ===
During the República Nova ("New Republic") (1946–1964) the Estado profiled itself to the National Democratic Union of Carlos Lacerda and opposed all the other governments, especially João Goulart. In 1954, O Estado de S. Paulo led a national campaign against the elected democratic President, Getúlio Vargas, leading him to commit suicide. In 1962, the director Júlio de Mesquita Filho even wrote a Roteiro da Revolução ("Guide to Revolution"), in an attempt to unify civilian opposition against the army, the then called "boasting party", which had intervened in Brazilian politics since the beginning of the Republic. In 1964, the Estado supported the military coup and the indirect election of Castelo Branco. Shortly after the Institutional Act n° 2 which dissolved the other political parties, the journal broke away from the regime.

=== Censorship ===
On 13 November 1968, the editor of the Estado was arrested because of Mesquita Filho's refusal to eliminate from the section Notas e Informações ("Notes and Information") the editorial Instituições em Frangalhos ("Institutions in Frazzles"). where he denounced the end of any normal and simple democratic appearance. From then on, the newspaper began disputing censored editions of its news by the Brazilian Federal Police, unlike other national newspapers that did not dispute censorship by the government.

With the death of Mesquita Filho, the Estado was directed by Julio de Mesquita Neto. Then, the newspaper gained worldwide visibility when it denounced the preemptive censorship of articles and replaced them with verses of the Portuguese classic The Lusiads, by Luís de Camões. In 1974, it received the Golden Pen of Freedom Award, bestowed by the International Federation of Editions and Newspapers.

In the 1970s, the newspaper ran into debt because of the construction of its new headquarters by the Tietê River, leading to a financial crisis, as it competed with a new standard of journalism represented by Folha de S. Paulo.

=== After military dictatorship ===
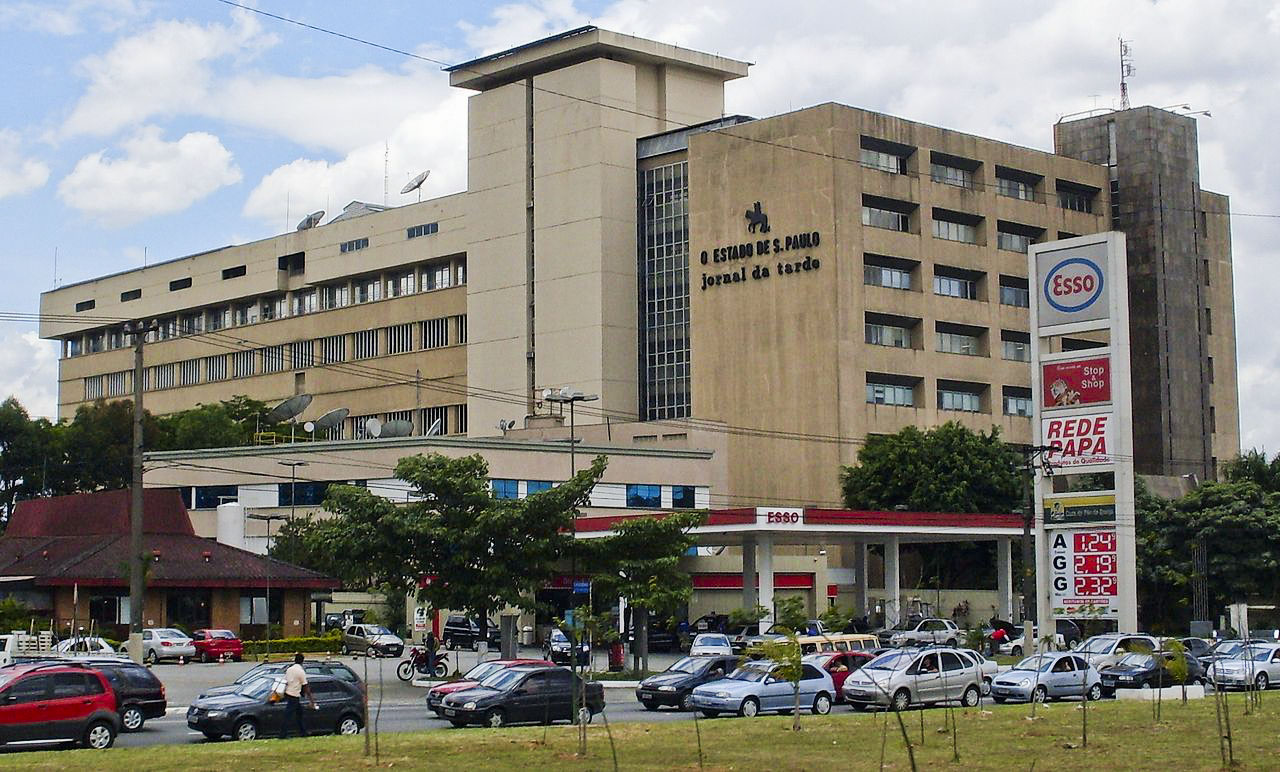
Headquarters of the newspaper on the Marginal Tietê

In 1986, the Estado hired the renowned journalist Augusto Nunes to be its chief editor. He updated the news bulletin of Estado and endeavored upon a series of reformed graphics, that would result in the adoption, in 1991, of colored printing in its daily editions. Before that, Estado was not issued on Monday and holidays. In 1996, Júlio de Mesquita Neto died and Ruy Mesquita, his brother, became the new director. Previously, Ruy directed Jornal da Tarde, owned by the Estado network.

After an unsuccessful experience in the area of telecommunications, the Estado network was restructured in 2003 and most of the Mesquita family lost their directorship roles. Massive layoffs also occurred. After balancing its budget, the Estado embarked upon a new graphic reformulation in October 2004. It also created new notebooks and received many prizes for excellence in graphic displays.

== Grupo Estado ==
Besides the newspaper O Estado de S. Paulo, the Estado network has control over the OESP Mídia (1984), a company that runs advertisements. Grupo Estado also owns the radios Rádio Eldorado AM and FM (1972) and the Estado Agency (1970), the largest news agency in Brazil. Jornal da Tarde (1966) was discontinued in 2012.

In 2013, another big reorganization followed. Employees were laid off and the paper reduced the number of pages.

== Political stance ==
The oldest of all the sections, known as Notas e Informações ("Notes and Information"), appears on page 3 and presents a republican institutionalist view, emphasizing liberty of expression, economic liberalism and Rechtsstaat – one of flagship columns of O Estado de S. Paulo. It was, initially, a supporter of the 1964 military coup d'état in Brazil and of the military dictatorship that then ensued. To this day, the newspaper is perceived to hold "right-wing" or "conservative" positions along the Brazilian political spectrum.

== Recent circulation history ==
| Year | 2014 | 2015 | 2016 | 2017 | 2018 | 2019 | 2020 | 2021 |
|---|---|---|---|---|---|---|---|---|
| Total circulation | 241,913 | 220,387 | 210,394 | 203,272 | 239,432 | 245,482 | 233,315 | 225,342 |
