= Raul Proença =

Portuguese writer

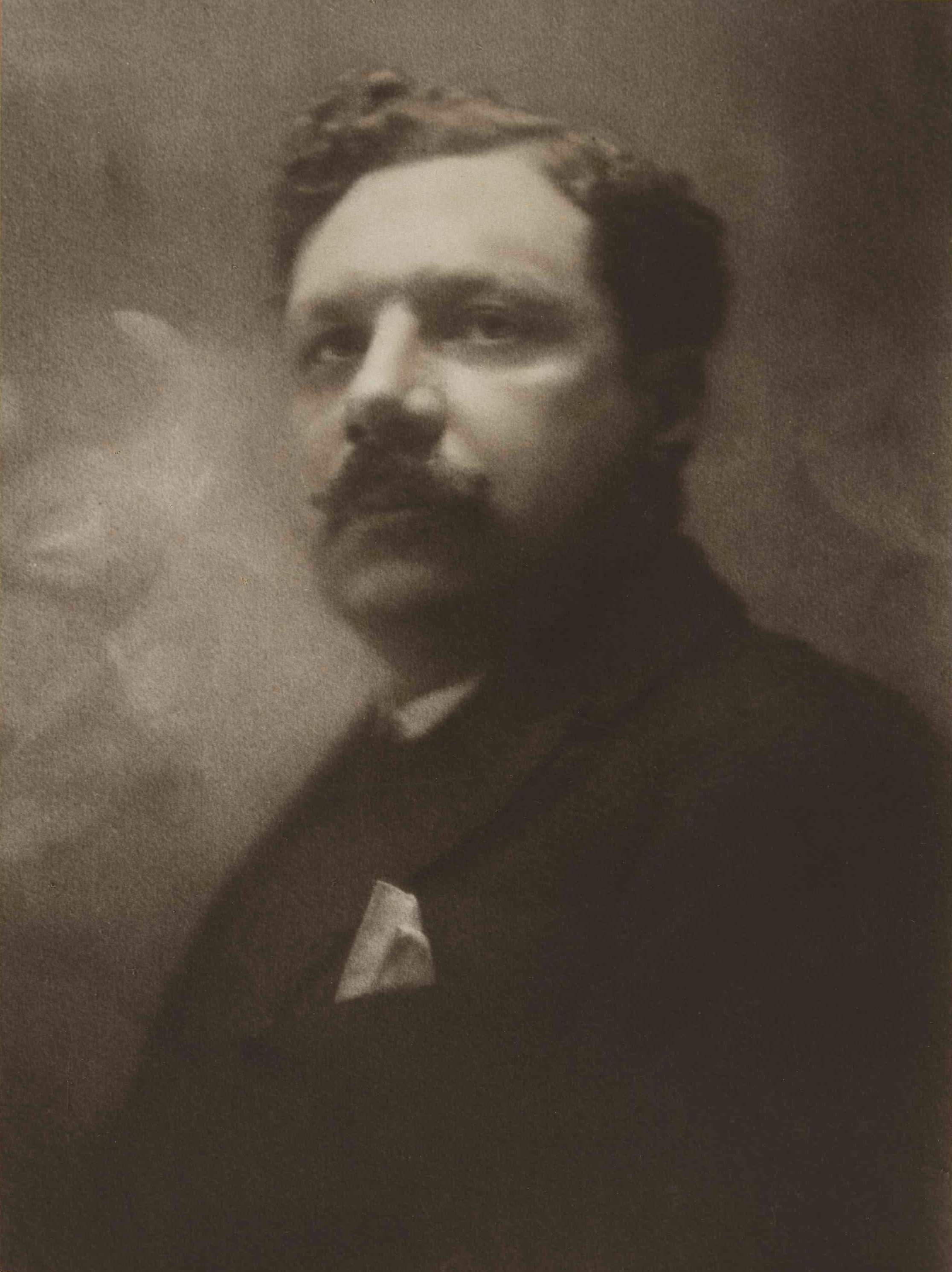
- Born: May 10, 1884; Caldas da Rainha
- Died: May 20, 1941 (aged 57); Porto
- Occupations: Writer, journalist, librarian, philosopher
- Known for: Journalism

Raul Proença (May 10, 1884 – May 20, 1941) was a Portuguese writer, journalist, and intellectual. Born in Caldas da Rainha, Proença obtained a degree in economic and financial sciences from the Instituto Industrial e Comercial de Lisboa. He was a founder of the magazine Seara Nova. In 1927, Proença was exiled in Paris. Proença returned to Portugal in 1932. He was hospitalized for mental illness, but died of typhoid fever in Porto.

Proença was a supporter of Lamarckian evolution. He argued that Jean-Baptiste Lamarck was the true founder of evolution.

== Biography ==
Graduated in Economic and Financial Sciences from the Industrial and Commercial Institute of Lisbon, with multifaceted thinking, he defined himself philosophically as an idealist and realist, defender of democratic socialism within a parliamentary regime.

Raul Proença was exiled in Paris, France, in 1927 after Portugal went through a coup that installed a military dictatorship. He defended his ideas and fought against Sidonism and the military dictatorship in 1926. In "The Military Dictatorship: History and Analysis of a Crime", he defends democracy against men like Mussolini who destroyed it in his country.
