= Portugal during World War I =

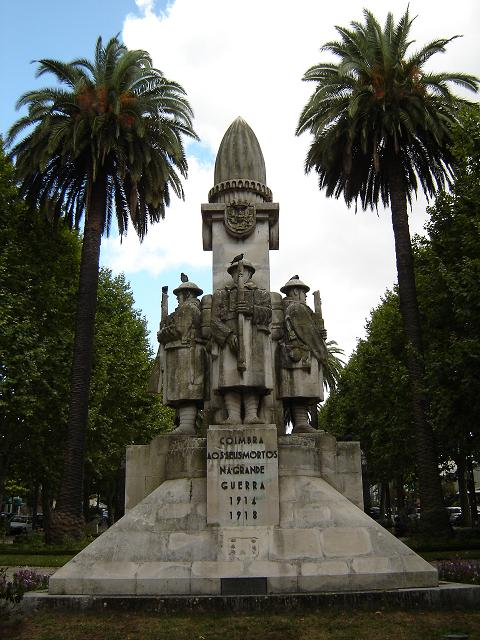
Monument in Coimbra, Portugal, to the Portuguese soldiers who died in World War I

The Kingdom of Portugal had been allied with England since 1373, and thus the Republic of Portugal was an ally of the United Kingdom. However, Portugal remained neutral from the start of World War I in 1914 until early 1916. In that time there were many hostile engagements with Germany. Portugal wanted to meet British requests for aid and protect its colonies in Africa, causing clashes with German troops in the south of Portuguese Angola, which bordered German South West Africa, in 1914 and 1915 (see German campaign in Angola).

Tensions between Germany and Portugal also arose as a result of German U-boat warfare, which sought to blockade the United Kingdom, at the time the most important market for Portuguese products. Ultimately this led to the confiscation of German ships interned in Portuguese ports in 1916, to which Germany reacted by declaring war on 9 March 1916. In total, from 1916 to 1918, about 91 Portuguese ships were sunk and five damaged by German U-boats, causing at least 170 casualties.

About 12,000 Portuguese troops died during World War I, including Africans who served in its armed forces on the colonial front. Civilian deaths by some estimates exceeded 220,000: 82,000 caused by food shortages and 138,000 by the Spanish flu.

== 1914 ==
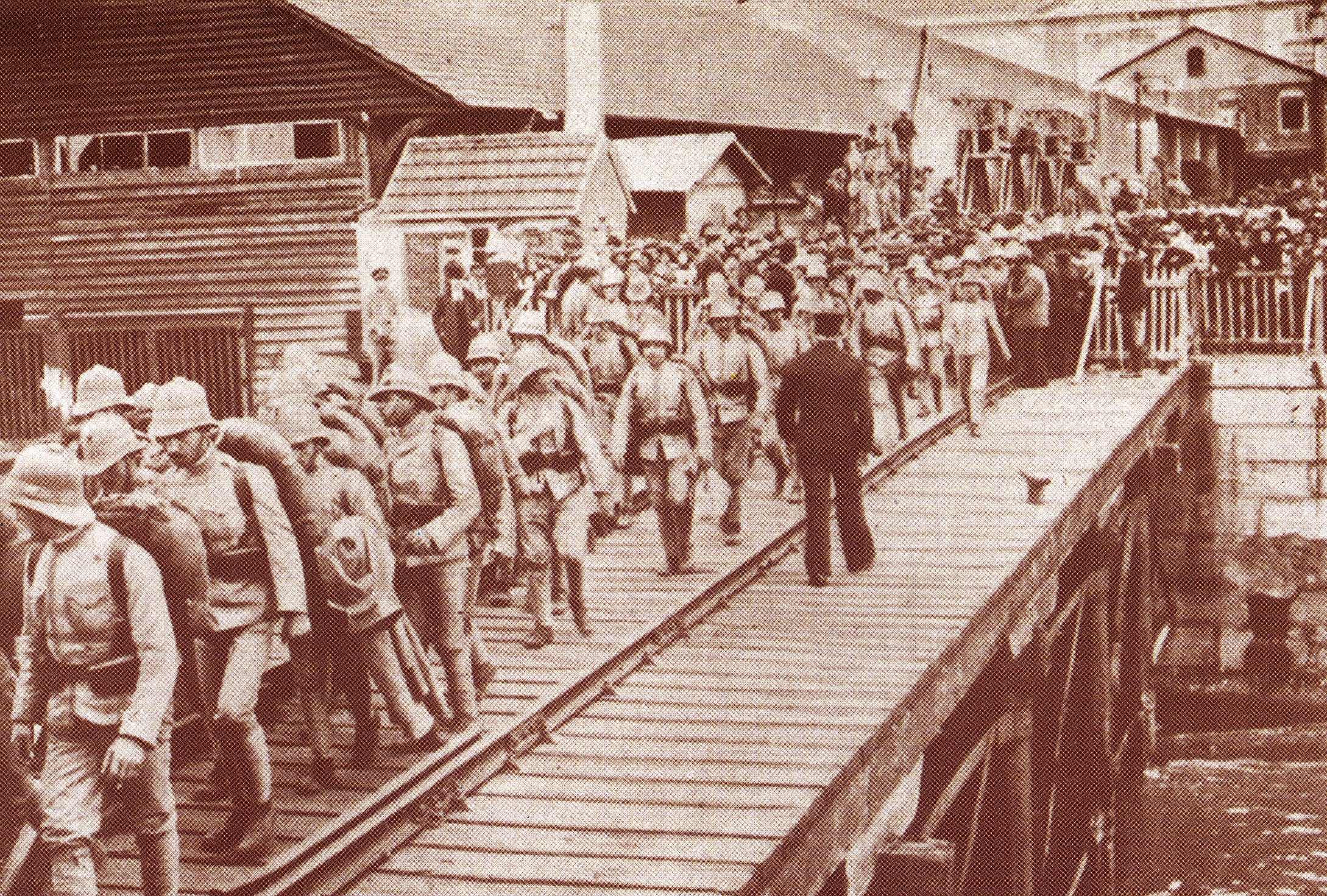
Portuguese troops embarking to Angola

- July: Breakdown in negotiations between Germany and Britain regarding revision of the Anglo-German Agreement of 1898 and the possible dismemberment of Portuguese colonies in Africa; in such an event, most of the land would have fallen to Germany. An Angola-Bund ("Angola League" to promote a German takeover) had been founded in 1912.
- August to September: Skirmishes occurred between German and Portuguese colonial troops in Africa, and the Germans instigated tribal revolts.
  - Maziua raid (24 August): A small German force attacked a Portuguese outpost at Maziua in Portuguese Mozambique, resulting in the first Portuguese casualties of World War I. The German central government accepted full responsibility, and offered an official apology.
- September: The Portuguese government sent reinforcements to the southern border of Angola. After war broke out, the border between German South West Africa and Angola remained open. The Germans hoped to supply food and possibly even arms through it. However, the Portuguese colonial government was hostile and tried to stop all trade. A few German nationals in Angola were interned.
- October: 1,600 troops arrive in Portuguese Angola and 1,527 troops arrived in Mozambique from Portugal, transported by British ships.

== 1915 ==
- November: 1,527 troops arrived in Mozambique, commanded by Moura Mendes. The second force was tasked with recapturing the Kionga Triangle from the Germans.

== 1916 ==
When Portugal complied with a British request to confiscate German ships interned in Portuguese ports, Germany reacted by declaring war on Portugal, thus forcing the Portuguese into the war.

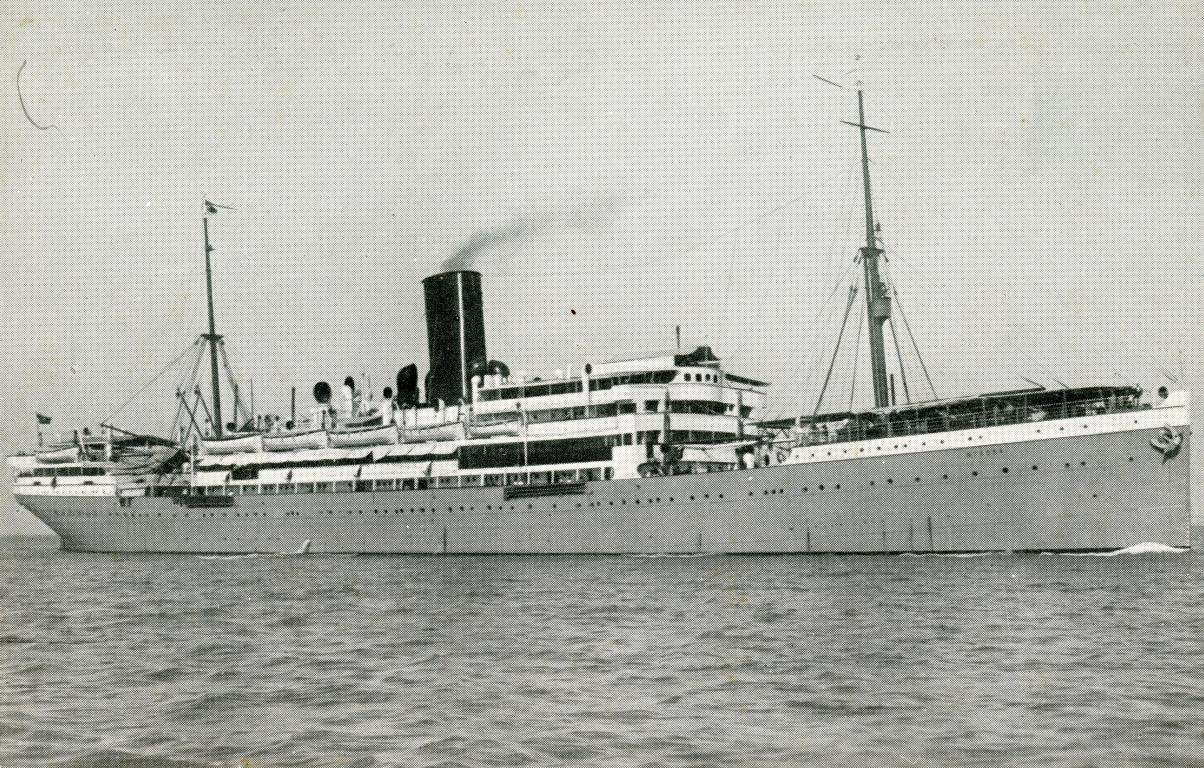
Norddeutscher Lloyd's Bülow

- February 23: (See: Portuguese seizure of German and Austrian ships) Following a British request, the commander of the Portuguese Navy division in Lisbon seized 36 German and Austro-Hungarian ships in Lisbon. On each ship a Portuguese crew was put aboard, and the flag of Portugal was raised. The Prime Minister of Portugal, Afonso Costa, denied that this was an act of war, and the Portuguese Ambassador in Berlin was instructed to assure the German government that Portugal would respect the rights of German shipowners. Portugal stated that it had requisitioned the ships "in the public interest", for the "necessities of the nation's economic situation". Portugal had not confiscated the ships, and they would be converted for "transport and other purposes". An explosive device was discovered in the boiler room of the Norddeutscher Lloyd ship Bülow, which was designed to detonate if the ship were moved. The Portuguese prevented it from being detonated, but her machinery was damaged.

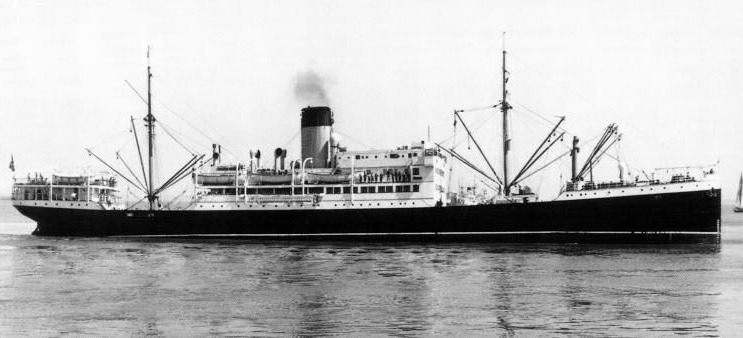
Portugal seized Hamburg America Line's Westerwald and converted her into the troopship Lima

- February 25: In other Portuguese ports there were another 80 German and Austro-Hungarian ships, adding up to a total tonnage of more than 150,000 GRT. On 25 February Portugal seized eight German ships in São Vicente, Cape Verde, and announced that it intended to requisition German and Austro-Hungarian ships in other ports in Portugal and in the Portuguese Empire.
- February 28: a German diplomatic note to Portugal protested that the seizure of the ships violated German treaty rights.
- March 3: By this date Portugal had seized all German ships in Mormugão in Goa.
- March 9: Germany declared war on Portugal. The Portuguese government started to organise the participation of its troops on the Western Front. Shortly afterward, Portugal began closing its consulates in the Ottoman Empire. (The Ottomans had no representation in Portugal.)
- March 15: Austria-Hungary declared war on Portugal.
- June 9: Finance Minister Afonso Costa took part in an Allied Economic Conference in which the Allies decided that Germany must return the territories of Alsace-Lorraine to France (occupied since 1871) and Kionga in Mozambique to Portugal (occupied since 1894) as a condition for peace.
- July 15: The British government formally invited Portugal to take part in the military operations of the Allies.
- July 22: The Portuguese Expeditionary Corps (Corpo Expedicionário Português, CEP), with 30,000 soldiers, was established in Tancos, Portugal, under the command of General Norton de Matos.
- August 7: The Portuguese Parliament accepted the participation of Portugal in the war, following the invitation of the British government. The Portuguese war effort reached 55,000 infantry soldiers, plus 1,000 artillerymen, to be sent to France, 4,000 soldiers per month, to man 12 kilometres (7.5 mi) of battlefront. Only the first two divisions reached France. At the same time, Portugal fielded forces in its African colonies: in Mozambique to defend the colony from German colonial forces, and in the south of Angola against native unrest instigated by the Germans.
- December 3: SM U-38, captained by Max Valentiner, entered Funchal harbour in Madeira and torpedoed and sank three ships: CS Dacia (1,856 GRT), Kanguroo (2,493 GRT) and Surprise (680 GRT). The commander of the French gunboat Surprise and 34 of her crew (7 Portuguese) were killed in the attack. Dacia, a British cable layer, which had previously undertaken war work off the coast of Casablanca and Dakar, was in the process of diverting the German South American cable into Brest, France. After the attack, the Germans bombarded Funchal for two hours from a range of about 2 nautical miles (4 km). Batteries on Madeira returned fire and eventually forced the Germans to withdraw.
- December 26: The French government asked Portugal to send artillery crews to France to operate 20 to 30 heavy artillery batteries.

== 1917 ==
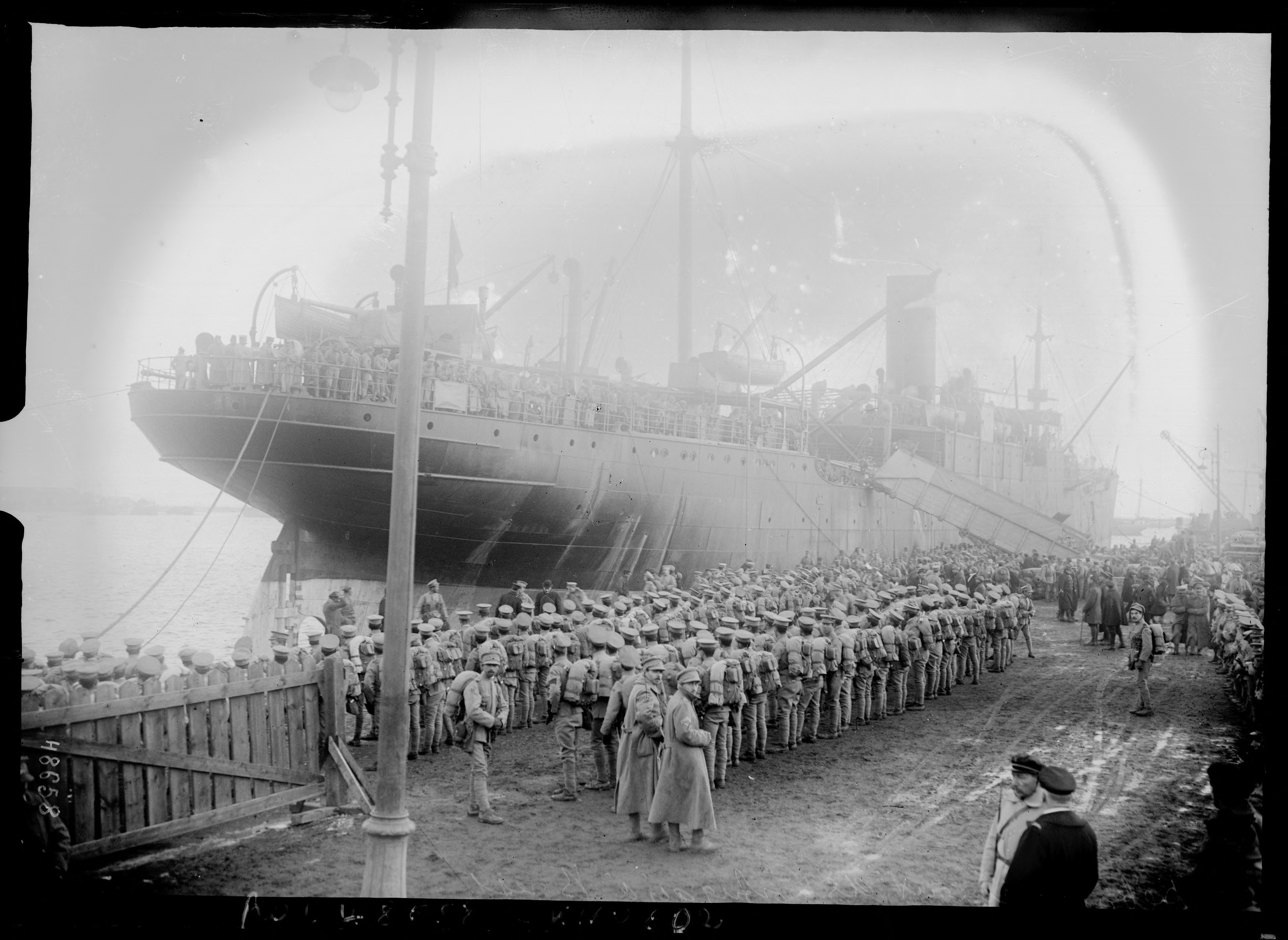
Portuguese troops disembarking at Brest.

- A few Portuguese troops were sent to the New Forest in Britain, to help with a timber shortage in collaboration with the Canadian Forestry Corps. The stone chimney of their cookhouse is preserved as a monument to them, known as the Portuguese Fireplace.
- January 3: A convention with Britain regulated Portuguese participation in the Western Front. Portuguese troops of the CEP were to be integrated in the BEF (British Expeditionary Force).
- January 7: The Independent Heavy Artillery Corps (Corpo de Artilharia Pesada Independente, CAPI) was created to respond to the French request for artillery crews. Under the Portuguese Superior Command, this unit was to operate 25 heavy artillery batteries.
- February 2: The first Portuguese troops arrived at the port of Brest in Brittany, France.
- February 23: The second contingent of the CEP leaves for France.
- April 4: The Portuguese troops arrive at the front. The first Portuguese casualty was Private António Gonçalves Curado, killed in action.
- May 30: The First Infantry Brigade of the CEP First Division occupied a sector at the battle front.
- June 4: Germans attacked the sector defended by the First Brigade.
- June 16: Second Infantry Brigade occupied another sector on the battle front.
- July 4: U-155 bombarded Ponta Delgada, Azores and killed four people. United States Navy collier USS Orion responded with 3-inch gunfire, causing U-155 to withdraw.
- July 10: CEP First Division assumed responsibility of its part of the Portuguese sector on the battle front. It was subordinated to the XI Corps of the British Army under the command of General Richard Haking. CEP Third Infantry Brigade occupied a sector on the front.
- September 23: The Fourth Brigade, known as the Brigade of Minho (Brigada do Minho), part of the Second Division, reached the front.
- October 17: The first Portuguese CAPI artillery soldiers, representing Portugal's direct support to the French war effort, arrived in France. They were designated by the French as the Corps d'artillerie lourde portugais (CALP).
- November 5: Portuguese command assumed responsibility for its sector in the front. Until then, it had been under the command of General Henry Horne's British First Army.
- Late 1917: General Paul von Lettow-Vorbeck's German colonial force entered Mozambique from nearby German East Africa after a series of long-running battles with numerically superior British forces.
- December 12: two German U-boats, U-156 and U-157 (captained by Max Valentiner), again bombarded Funchal. The attack lasted about 30 minutes, and forty 120 mm (4.7 in) and 150 mm (5.9 in) shells were fired. There were three fatalities and 17 wounded, and a number of houses and Santa Clara Church were hit.
- December 17: U-156 stopped and scuttled the Portuguese ship Açoriano (a wooden three-masted schooner) southeast of the Azores.
- December 26: U-157 (captained by Max Valentiner) sank the Portuguese ship Lidia in the Azores.

== 1918 ==
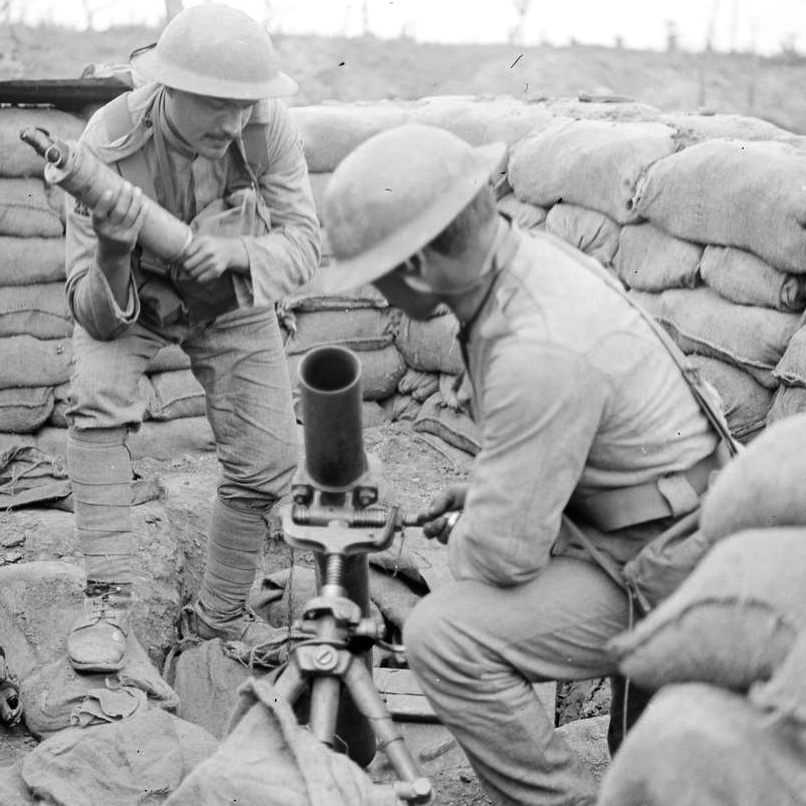
Portuguese troops loading a Stokes Mortar.

- February 17: SM U-157 (captained by Max Valentiner) sank the Portuguese ship Estrella de Bissao off the coast of South Africa.
- March 16: The Portuguese artillery batteries entered action.
- March 27: A German offensive prevented Portuguese soldiers from being released from combat. As a third Portuguese Division was never sent to France, the Portuguese Army received no reinforcements at all. Portuguese soldiers had to serve in the battle front for long periods, and were thus among the most exhausted men in the front.
- April 6: The conditions of the Portuguese soldiers became so difficult that the British finally decided to release them. The CEP was supposed to be reorganised, the First Division going to the rear as a reserve force and the Second Division becoming part of the Eleventh Corps of the British Army, under General Haking's command. Haking visited the Portuguese troops and decided to send the Second Division to the rear from April 9, but it never happened. The Germans attacked the British lines, forcing them to retreat about 60 kilometres (37 mi). Instead of being released, Portuguese troops had to fight off the German offensive on their sector.

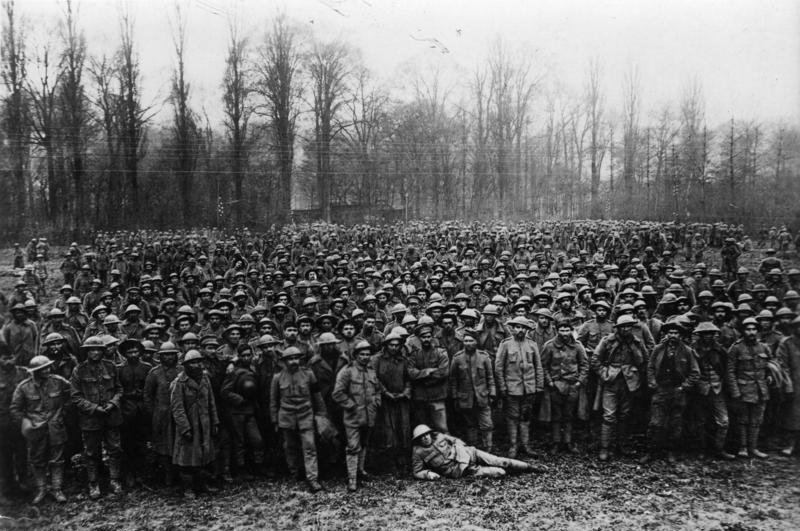
Portuguese prisoners-of-war in 1918

- April 9: The Battle of La Lys, as it became known in Portugal, or Operation Georgette or the Battle of Estaires to the British, started with a heavy artillery barrage from the Germans, followed by a German offensive with intensive use of poison gas. The German Sixth Army deployed eight divisions (about 100,000 men), supported by intensive artillery fire. Against the force, the Portuguese had 20,000 soldiers and 88 guns. As a result, the Second Division was decimated in the battle. The CEP lost 327 officers and 7,098 soldiers, about 35 percent of its effective fighting capacity. The survivors were sent to the rear, some of the units being integrated into the British Army later on.

During this battle, one of the most courageous acts in Portuguese military history was perpetrated, as Private Aníbal Milhais (also known as "Soldado Milhões" ["A Soldier as good as a million others" in his commanding officer's words]) defended the retreating Allied forces with nothing but his machine gun, allowing them to fall back and regroup. He defeated two German regiments and forced the remaining German forces to go around him. They found it impossible to defeat what they believed to be a heavily armed post. Once he ran out of bullets, he escaped the battlefield. He got lost along the way, and had nothing to eat for three days but the sweet almonds his family had sent him from Portugal. Lost and exhausted, he rescued a British major from drowning in a swamp. The major led him to the Allied camp, and told of Milhais's deeds.

- July: General Tomás António Garcia Rosado was appointed as the new Commanding Chief of the remaining CEP.
- July: The German force under General Lettow-Vorbeck captured Namacurra in Portuguese East Africa and seized important arms and supplies. Similar smaller successes against Portuguese outposts had already helped resupply his force.
- July 4: CEP First Division was subordinated to the British Fifth Army commanded by General William Birdwood.
- August 25: General Garcia Rosado assumed command of the CEP in France. U-157 sank the Portuguese ship Gloria, 50 kilometres (30 mi) from Porto Santo Island, Madeira.
- September 22: U-157 sank the Portuguese ship Gaia near the Azores.
- October 14: In the action of 14 October 1918, U-139 commanded by Lothar von Arnauld de la Perière sank the Portuguese patrol boat NRP Augusto Castilho commanded by Carvalho Araújo, after several hours of fighting.
- November 11: Germany accepted the armistice proposed by the Allies. The war ended.

The war caused Portugal 8,145 dead, 13,751 wounded and 12,318 prisoners or missing. At sea, 96 Portuguese ships were sunk (100,193 tons) and 5 Portuguese ships damaged (7,485 tons) by German submarines.

== After the war ==
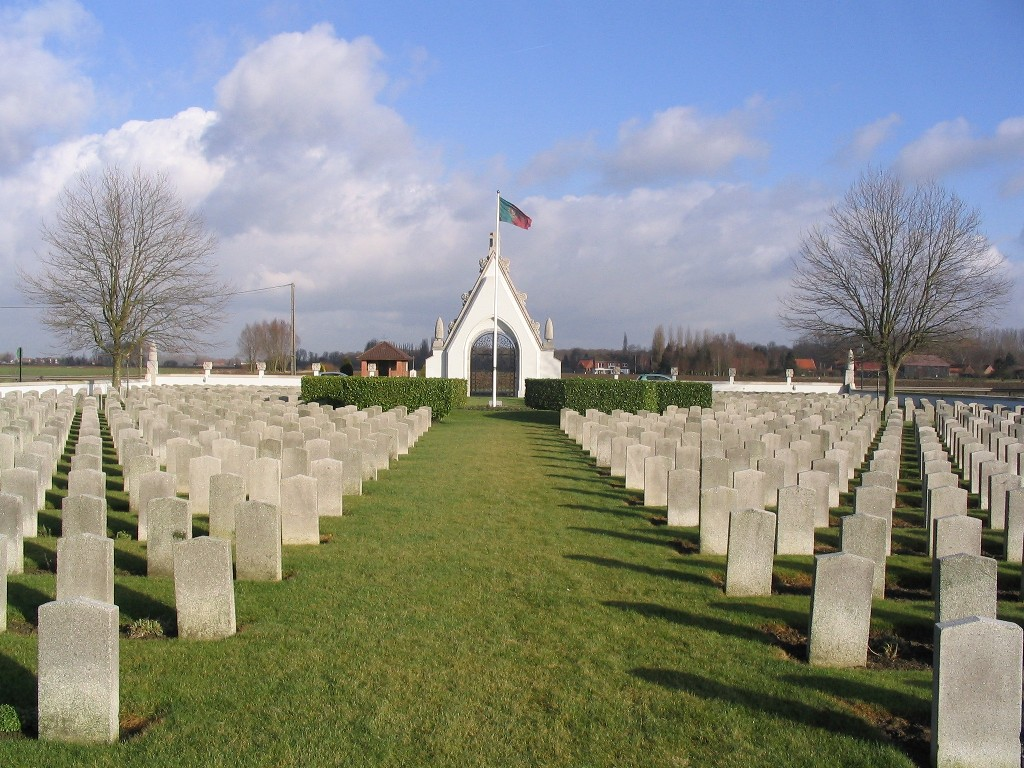
Portuguese Military Cemetery, Richebourg, France

=== 1919 ===
- January 19: Professor Egas Moniz led the Portuguese delegation at the Peace Conference in Versailles, France. In the Treaty of Versailles, Germany ceded the port of Kionga, associated with German East Africa (now mainland Tanzania), to Portugal. This was the only territory gained by Portugal for taking part in World War I on the side of the victorious Allies.

=== 1921 ===
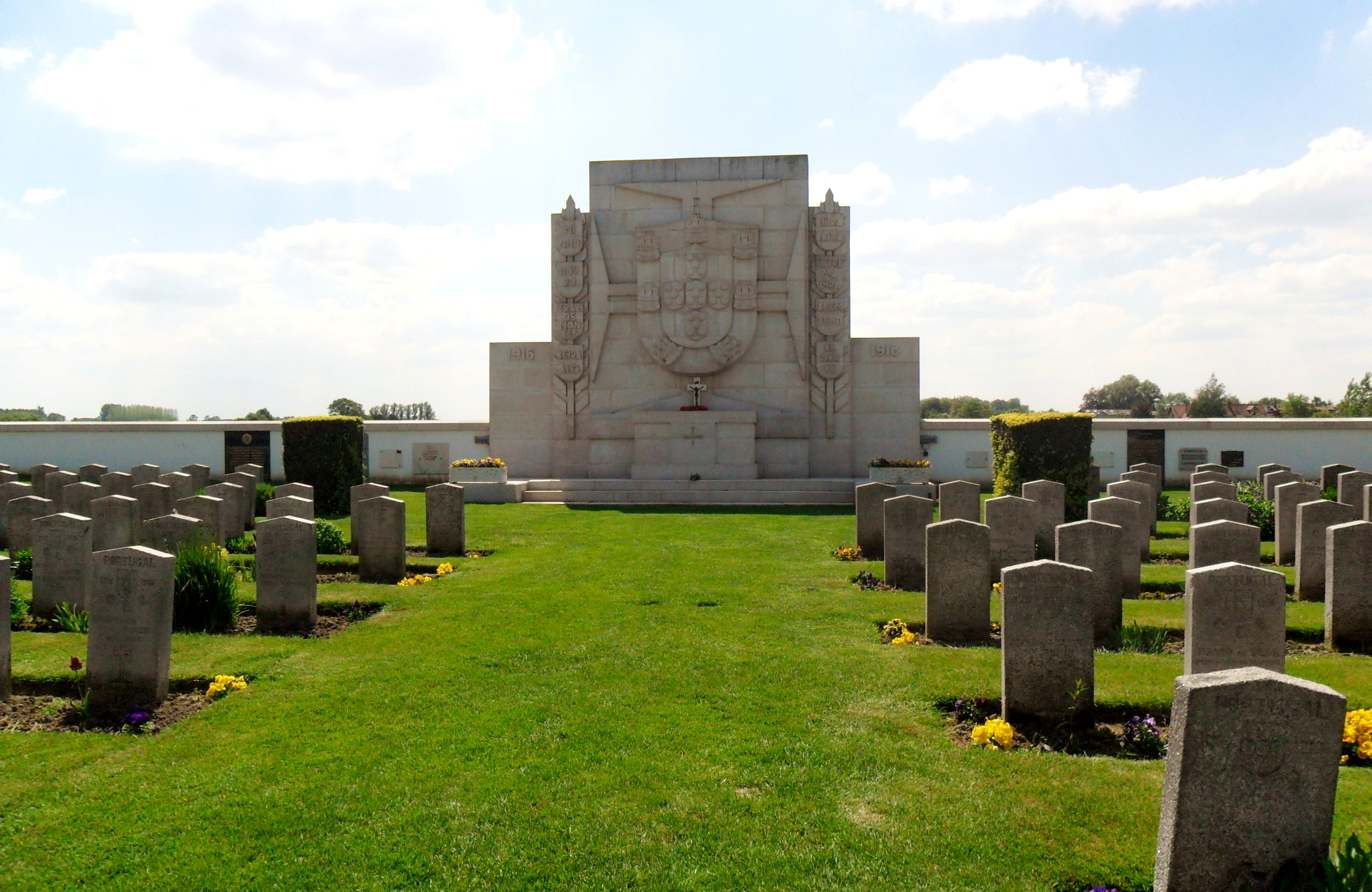
Portuguese Military Cemetery, Richebourg, France

- November 19: Charles I, the last emperor of Austria-Hungary, went into exile on the Portuguese island of Madeira, where he remained until his death on April 1, 1922. In 1917 he had secretly tried to enter peace negotiations with France. Although his foreign minister Ottokar Czernin was interested in negotiating only a general peace that would include Germany as well, Charles himself, in negotiations with the French with his brother-in-law Prince Sixtus of Bourbon-Parma, an officer in the Belgian army, as an intermediary, went much farther in suggesting his willingness to make a separate peace. When news of the overture leaked in April 1918, Charles denied involvement until French Prime Minister Georges Clemenceau published letters signed by Charles. That led to Czernin's resignation and forced Austria-Hungary into an even more dependent position with respect to its German ally. Determined to prevent a restoration attempt, the Council of Allied Powers agreed on Madeira as a place of exile for the former emperor because it was isolated in the Atlantic and easily guarded.

== See also ==
- Portugal during World War II
