= German submarine U-141 =

U-141 may refer to one of the following German submarines:

- SM U-141, a Type U 139 submarine launched in 1918 and that served in the First World War until surrendered on 26 November 1918; broken up at Upnor in 1923
  - During the First World War, Germany also had this submarine with a similar name:
    - SM UB-141, a Type UB III submarine laid down but unfinished at the end of the war; broken up on the slip in 1919
- German submarine U-141 (1940), a Type IID submarine that served in the Second World War until scuttled on 2 May 1945; wreck broken up at later date
