= Periere =

Periere is a French last name.

- Péreire brothers, 19th century French financiers
- Friedrich von Arnauld de la Perière, a German pilot and General
- Lothar von Arnauld de la Perière, a German naval officer
