= NRP Augusto de Castilho =

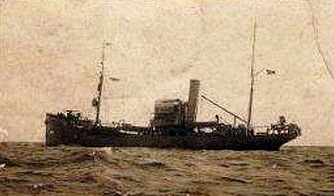
- NRP Augusto de Castilho, stern view

History

Portugal
- Name: Augusto de Castilho
- Builder: Cochrane & Sons Shipbuilders, Selby
- Launched: 1909
- Fate: Sunk in battle, 13 October 1918

General characteristics
- Class & type: Naval trawler
- Displacement: 801 tonnes (788 long tons)
- Length: 48.76 m (160.0 ft)
- Installed power: 704 shp (525 kW)
- Propulsion: Steam
- Speed: 9 knots (17 km/h; 10 mph)
- Complement: 42
- Armament: 1 × 65 mm Hotchkiss gun; 1 × 47 mm Hotchkiss gun

NRP Augusto de Castilho was a warship in service of the Portuguese Navy during World War I. It was sunk in combat while escorting the steamer São Miguel, originating the last Portuguese casualties of that conflict.

== Civilian service ==
Originally a steam-powered fishing vessel named Elite. The vessel was requisitioned by the Portuguese government to serve as a patrol boat during World War I.

== Naval service ==
On 23 March 1918 Augusto de Castilho, commanded by Lieutenant Augustus de Almeida Teixeira, was convoying the transport ship Loanda when a submarine was spotted. The Portuguese patrol ship opened fire at about 500 metres (1,600 ft) at the unidentified submarine, which dived promptly. On 21 August 1918, commanded by Lieutenant Fernando de Oliveira Pinto, Augusto de Castilho attacked a large German submarine with gunfire that disappeared quickly.

On 13 October while escorting the passenger ship São Miguel, Augusto de Castilho, under the command of First Lieutenant Carvalho Araújo, was sighted by the German submarine SM U-139. The submarine, commanded by Lothar von Arnauld de la Perière, tried to attack the passenger ship but failed due to the intervention of Augusto de Castilho. The Portuguese patrol ship was armed with two Hotchkiss gun pieces, a 65 mm caliber gun at the bow and a 47 mm caliber gun at stern, while U-139 was armed with two 150 mm naval guns and six torpedo tubes. The Portuguese warship was sunk after a fierce two-hour battle with the loss of four crewmembers, among them Carvalho Araújo.

== See also ==
- Portuguese Expeditionary Corps
