= Carvalho Araújo =

Portuguese Navy officer and colonial administrator

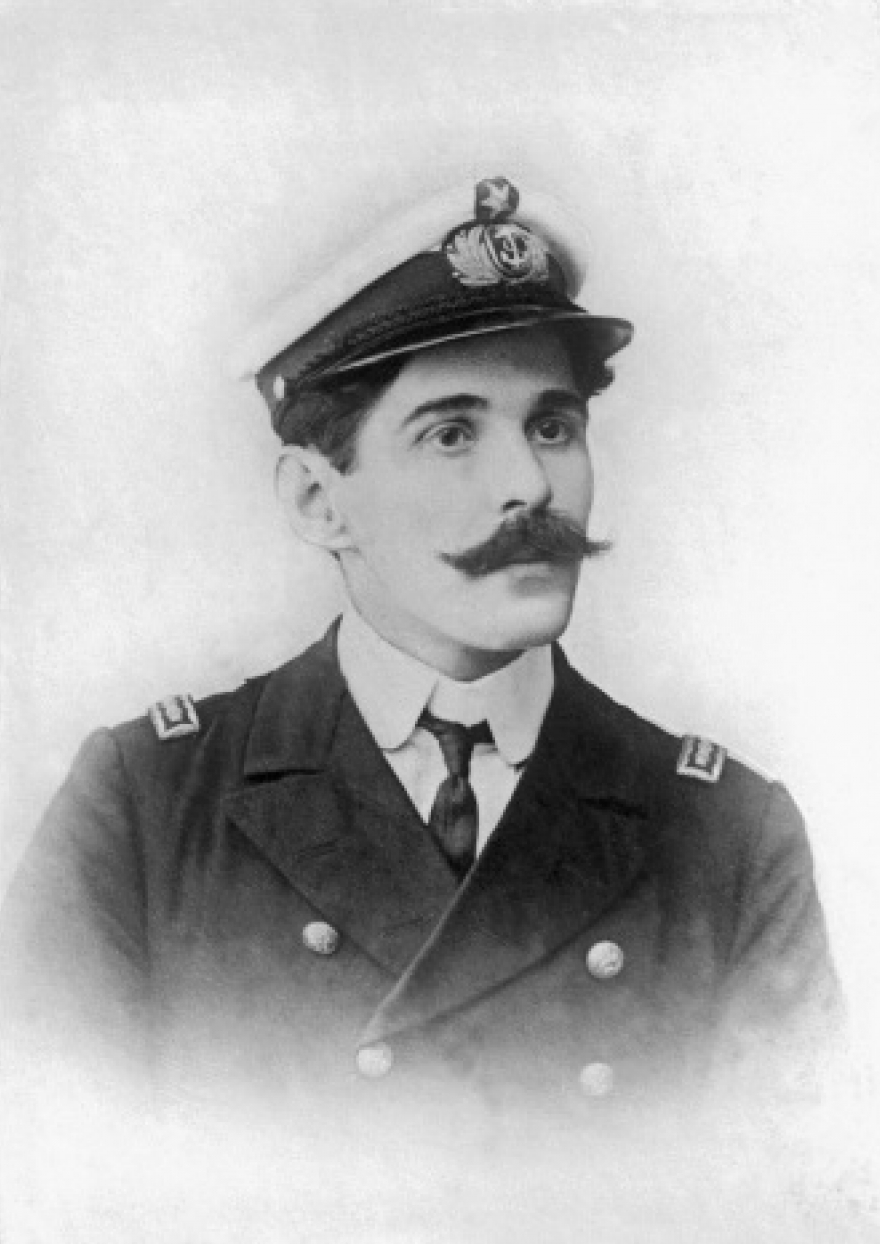
- Born: 18 May 1881; Porto, Portugal
- Died: 14 October 1918 (aged 37); Atlantic Ocean
- Military career
- Allegiance: Kingdom of Portugal; First Portuguese Republic
- Branch: Portuguese Navy
- Service years: 1899–1918
- Rank: Captain-Lieutenant (posthumous)
- Commands: NRP Augusto Castilho
- Conflicts: World War I; Action of 14 October 1918 †
- Awards: Copper Medal of Philanthropy and Charity ("socorros e naufrágios"); Exemplary Behaviour Silver Medal; Silver Medal commemorative of the campaigns of the Portuguese Army in Southern Angola (1914–1915); Order of the Tower and Sword, 2nd class (posthumous); 1st class War Cross (Silver Medal, posthumous).

José Botelho de Carvalho Araújo (18 May 1881 – 14 October 1918) was a Portuguese Navy officer and colonial administrator who died in action in World War I battling German U-boat SM U-139, commanded by submarine ace Lothar von Arnauld de la Perière.

== Life ==
Son of José de Carvalho Araújo Júnior and Margarida Ferreira Botelho de Araújo, he was born in the northern city of Porto at the parish of São Nicolau, while his parents were visiting the city. Two months later, his parents returned to Vila Real in Trás os Montes where they lived.

After completing his studies at the Academia Politécnica do Porto, he enlisted in the Portuguese Navy in 1899.

He served on several ships: the frigate Dom Afonso, the corvette Duque da Terceira, the cruisers Vasco da Gama, Adamastor and São Rafael, the gunboats Zambeze, Liberal, Diu and Lúrio, the tugboat Bérrio and the transport ship Salvador Correia.

A strong supporter of the republican ideals, he was elected deputy after the proclamation of the Portuguese Republic and governor of the Inhambane district in the Portuguese colony of Mozambique.

He died in action on 14 October 1918, at the command of the Portuguese naval trawler NRP Augusto Castilho while successfully protecting the cargo ship São Miguel from the attack of the German U-boat SM U-139, commanded by submarine ace Lothar von Arnauld de la Perière. The German U-boat engaged the São Miguel on the surface with her 15 cm SK L/45 deck gun, but was immediately confronted by Augusto Castilho, which set a smoke screen to deceive the Germans. A two-hour fierce battle ensued, that ended with the sinking of the Portuguese trawler and the loss of four of the crew, among them First Lieutenant Carvalho Araújo. São Miguel managed to slip away, eventually reaching the port of Ponta Delgada in the Azores.

== Navy career ==
- 1903 – Midshipman
- 1905 – Lieutenant
- 1915 – First Lieutenant
- 1918 – Captain-Lieutenant (posthumous rank)
