= João Ferreira =

João Ferreira may refer to:

- Bigode (João Ferreira, 1922–2003), Brazilian footballer
- João Augusto Ferreira de Almeida (1873–1917), executed Portuguese soldier
- João Ferreira (politician) (born 1978), Portuguese politician
- João Ferreira (hurdler) (born 1986), Portuguese athlete
- João Ferreira (footballer) (born 2001), Portuguese footballer
