= Action of 14 October 1918 =

WWI submarine attack on Portuguese ships

- Part of World War I Atlantic U-boat Campaign
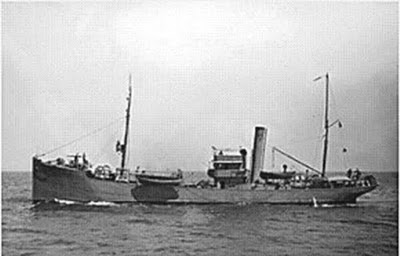
- Portuguese Navy ship NRP Augusto de Castilho
Date	14 October 1918
Location	Atlantic Ocean, 200 miles from Ponta Delgada, Azores
Result	Portuguese naval trawler is sunk but accomplishes mission of protecting the civilian steamer

Belligerents
Portugal	German Empire

Commanders and leaders
Carvalho Araújo †	(German Empire) Lothar von Arnauld de la Perière

Strength
1 naval trawler 1 civilian steamer	1 Submarine

Casualties and losses
Naval trawler sunk with 6 dead and several wounded	Submarine damaged, unknown human casualties

The action of 14 October was a naval engagement of the First World War when the Imperial German Navy submarine SM U-139 attacked the Portuguese civilian steamer São Miguel and the Portuguese Navy naval trawler NRP Augusto de Castilho in the Atlantic Ocean on 14 October 1918.

== Background ==
On the island of Madeira, the Portuguese patrol boat NRP Augusto de Castilho under the command of the First Lieutenant Carvalho Araújo received the mission of escorting the Portuguese civilian steamer São Miguel, which was property of the Empresa Insulana de Navegação and was sailing from the Port of Funchal in Madeira to the port of Ponta Delgada on the Azores archipelago, with 206 passengers and several tons of cargo on board.

NRP Augusto de Castilho, originally the fishing trawler Elite, built in 1909, had been requisitioned by the Portuguese government and transferred to the service of the Portuguese Navy which adapted it to serve as an escort ship following Portugal's entering into the war in 1916. The ship was equipped with two small Hotchkiss cannon, one of 65 mm on the bow and another of 47 mm on the stern.

== Action ==
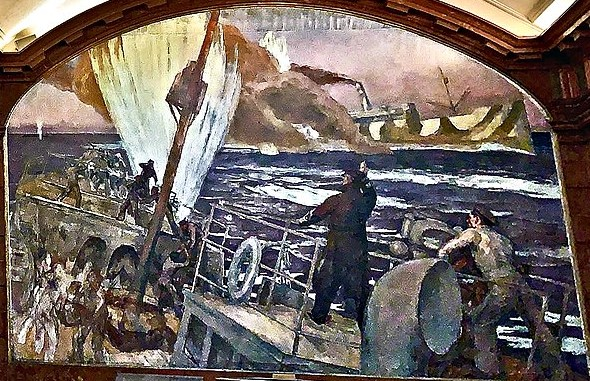
Painting of the battle

After leaving Funchal at sunset on 13 October, São Miguel came under fire at 06:15 AM on 14 October from the German submarine U-139, one of the more and better equipped submarines of the Imperial German Navy, armed with two powerful 150 mm cannon and six torpedo tubes, and under the command of Lothar von Arnauld de la Perière. In order to protect São Miguel, and after using all the smoke canisters available for creating a smoke curtain while repeatedly firing the stern cannon, Araújo gave orders for NRP Augusto de Castilho to turn to port, describing half a circle, and advance towards the German U-139, taking gunfire from the submarine, thus giving São Miguel time to escape at full speed.

After two hours of fierce but one-sided fighting, and with several fatal casualties on deck, the guns damaged, without ammunition, and having lost the telegraph and the ship's engine, the Portuguese ship surrendered by lowering the national flag and raising a white flag. However, the German submarine continued firing, hitting the patrol ship with a direct shot which killed Araújo and injured Midshipman Armando Ferraz for a second time. After receiving orders from the Midshipman to abandon ship, the Portuguese survivors were able to enter in two life boats. The ship was then boarded and sunk by the Germans with explosive charges.

== Aftermath ==
One of the life boats arrived at the island of Santa Maria Island after 48 hours with 29 of the survivors, with one of the injured sailors having died during their journey. The other life boat, with 12 survivors onboard arrived at the island of São Miguel Island, on 17 October.

The action was U-139's last and as a few weeks later the submarine surrendered to France on 24 November 1918.

== See also ==
- History of Portugal
- Portuguese First Republic
- Battle of the Lys (1918)
- Portuguese Expeditionary Corps
