= Capital punishment in Portugal =

Europe holds the greatest concentration of abolitionist states (blue). Map current as of 2022 Abolished for all offences Abolished in practice Retains capital punishment

Capital punishment in Portugal has been abolished since 1976. Portugal was a pioneer in the abolition of capital punishment, having abolished initially in 1867. No executions have been carried out since 1916, and no executions for civil offences have been carried out since 1846, with the formal abolition of capital punishment for civil wrong occurring in 1867. The death penalty in Portugal was carried out by hanging.

== History ==
During the medieval ages, the method used was hanging (for commoners), or beheading for nobles. During the Inquisition, the method was strangulation (by garrote), or burning at the stake. Later, around the 15th century, during the Manueline and Philippine Ordinances, it was determined as hanging, typically short drop; during WW1, the method was by firing squad. Portugal was the first country in the world to begin the process to abolish the death penalty, abolishing it in stages. For political crimes capital punishment was abolished in 1852, for all crimes except the military in 1867, and for all crimes in 1911. In 1916, Portugal entered in World War I and it was re-established for military crimes in wartime with a foreign country in the theatre of war.

With the new Constitution in 1976, capital punishment was again abolished for all crimes.

The last execution in Portugal took place in Lagos in 1846. The execution of a soldier of the Portuguese Expeditionary Corps carried out in France during World War I was poorly documented until recently. Soldier João Augusto Ferreira de Almeida underwent an execution by firing squad on 16 September 1917. He was issued a "moral rehabilitation" by the Council of Ministers and the President of Portugal, also the Supreme Commander of the Armed Forces in 2017, which was the 100th anniversary of his execution and 150th anniversary of the end of capital punishment for civil crimes in Portugal. The action was purely symbolic, and not a reappreciation of the facts of the case, an exoneration, or a pardon. This was merely the "rehabilitation of the memory of a soldier convicted to a sentence contrary to human rights and the values and principles that have been long ingrained in Portuguese society."

== Public opinion ==
In the 2008 European Values Study (EVS), 51.6 percent of respondents in Portugal said the death penalty can never be justified, while only 1.5% said it can be always justified.

== Politics ==
Today, most political circles are opposed to the idea of reintroducing the death penalty, although it has support from some members of the Chega, a far right, anti-immigration and nationalist political party. In a 2020 Chega party referendum, 44 percent voted in favor of death penalty for crimes such as terrorism or child abuse.
