= Type U 139 submarine =

German World War I U-boat class

Class overview
- Builders: Germaniawerft, Kiel
- Operators: Imperial German Navy
- Completed: 3

General characteristics
- Displacement: 1,930 t (1,900 long tons) surfaced; 2,483 t (2,444 long tons) submerged
- Length: 92.00 m (301 ft 10 in) (o/a); 71.50 m (234 ft 7 in) (pressure hull)
- Beam: 9.12 m (29 ft 11 in) (o/a); 5.75 m (18 ft 10 in) (pressure hull)
- Height: 11.20 m (36 ft 9 in)
- Draught: 5.27 m (17 ft 3 in)
- Installed power: 2 × diesel engines, 3,300 PS (2,400 kW; 3,300 shp) surfaced; 1,780 PS (1,310 kW; 1,760 shp) submerged
- Propulsion: 2 shafts; 2.10 m (6 ft 11 in) propellers
- Speed: 15.8 knots (29.3 km/h; 18.2 mph) surfaced; 7.6 knots (14.1 km/h; 8.7 mph) submerged
- Range: 17,750 nautical miles (32,870 km; 20,430 mi) at 8 knots (15 km/h; 9.2 mph) surfaced; 53 nautical miles (98 km; 61 mi) at 4.5 knots (8.3 km/h; 5.2 mph) submerged
- Test depth: 75 m (246 ft)
- Boats & landing craft carried: 1 cutter
- Complement: 6 officers, 56 men (1+20 as prize crew)
- Armament: 6 × 50 cm (19.7 in) torpedo tubes (4 bow, 2 stern); 24 G6 torpedoes; 2 × 15 cm (5.9 in) SK L/45 deck guns with 980 rounds; 2 × 8.8 cm (3.5 in) SK L/30 deck guns with 200 rounds

U-139, originally designated "Project 46", was a class of large, long-range U-boats built during World War I by the Kaiserliche Marine.

== Description ==
Three large U-cruisers, designated Type 139, were ordered from Germaniawerft of Kiel, in August 1916. Displacing nearly 2,000 tons, and with a surface speed of 15 knots (28 km/h; 17 mph), they were armed with 24 torpedoes and two 15 cm deck guns, and had a cruising range of around 17,000 nautical miles (31,000 km; 20,000 mi). They carried a large enough complement to furnish captured vessels with prize crews and their intended purpose was to capture or destroy merchant ships on the surface; their large-calibre deck guns and comparatively high speed allowed them to engage even armed merchant vessels.

Unlike the earlier Type U-151 submarines (originally designed as merchant submarines to evade naval blockades), the Type 139 was designed from the outset for combat service. Four bow and two stern torpedo tubes were fitted, but the main armament was the two 15 cm deck guns, which could be laid on target by a rangefinder on the aft section of the bridge. The conning tower's command centre was protected by 90 mm (3.5 in) of armour against the guns typically carried by enemy merchant ships, while the pressure hull was thicker than usual at 25 mm (0.98 in), so as to increase diving depth. The superstructure was also raised by 2 m (6 ft 7 in) so that a shell hitting it would not penetrate the pressure hull.

A Type 139 U-boat cost 8.7 million Marks at the time, the 15 cm guns accounting for around 7% of the cost. Three submarines of this type, U-139, U-140, and U-141, were ordered.

The later "Project 46(a)" specified even more powerful U-cruisers, of a similar displacement to the Type 139 boats, but with an increased surface speed of 18 knots (33 km/h; 21 mph), and with two 88 mm deck guns in addition to the two 150 mm guns.

An even larger U-cruiser was proposed under "Project 47", but never reached construction; it would have displaced 2,500 tons, had a top speed of 21 knots (39 km/h; 24 mph), and been armed with four 150 mm guns as well as six torpedo tubes, two of which would have fired to the side.

== Service ==
The Type 139 submarines were dispatched on long-range missions, south across the Equator, and to the west across the Atlantic, operating independently.

Lothar von Arnauld de la Perière commanded U-139, the first of the class, and named the submarine Kapitänleutnant Schweiger, after Walther Schwieger, who had sunk RMS Lusitania in 1915. Under von Arnauld, U-139 sank four ships from May 1918, and sank the last ship to fall to a Type 139 U-boat in World War I on 14 October 1918 the NRP Augusto de Castilho, a Portuguese armed mine hunting ship.

== List of Type U 139 submarines ==
Three Type U 139 submarines were built, all of which were commissioned into the Kaiserliche Marine.

- U-139 (Kapitänleutnant Schwieger)
- U-140 (Kapitänleutnant Kophamel)
- U-141

== Bibliography ==
- Compton-Hall, Richard (2004) [1991]. Submarines at War, 1914–18. Penzance: Periscope Publishing. ISBN 978-1-904381-21-1. OCLC 57639764.
- Gröner, Erich; Jung, Dieter; Maass, Martin (1991). U-boats and Mine Warfare Vessels. German Warships 1815–1945. Vol. 2. Translated by Thomas, Keith; Magowan, Rachel. London: Conway Maritime Press. ISBN 0-85177-593-4.
