= Portuguese Independent Heavy Artillery Corps =

Corpo de Artilharia Pesada Independente Corps d'artillerie lourde portugais Portuguese Independent Heavy Artillery Corps
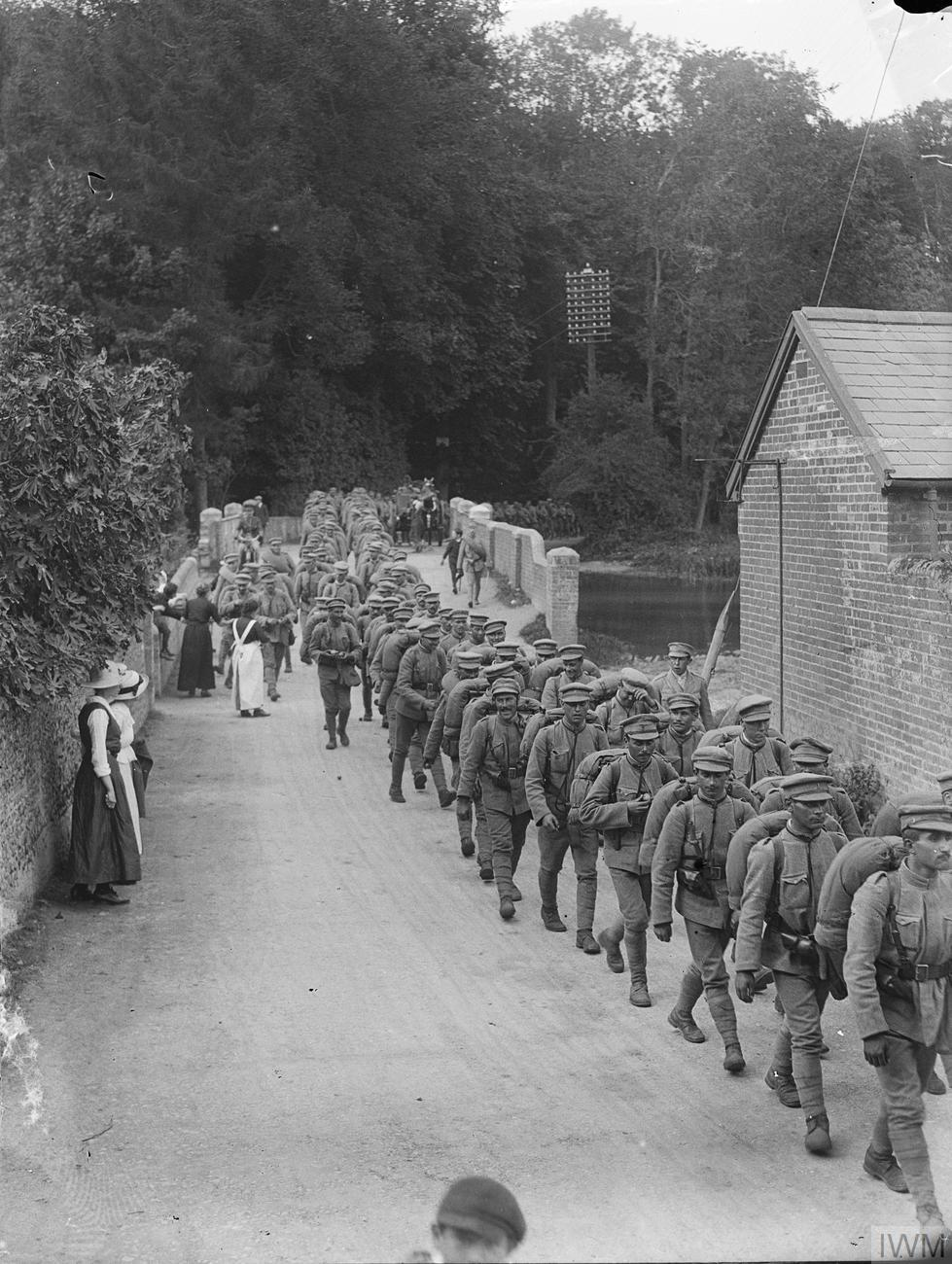
- Portuguese troops passing through the village of Twyford. Portuguese CAP (Corpo de Artilharia Pesada) at Hazeley Down Camp, near Winchester, taken in September, 1917.
- Active: 1917–1918
- Country: Portugal
- Allegiance: Portuguese Army
- Branch: Heavy artillery
- Type: Regiment
- Size: 1600
- Training base: Bailleul-sur-Thérain, France
- Equipment: 320 mm, 240 mm and 190 mm railways guns
- Engagements: World War I: Western Front

Commanders
- Commanding officer (May 17, 1917 to January 15, 1918): Colonel João Clímaco Homem Teles
- Commanding officer (January 15, 1918 to November 30, 1918): Colonel Tristão da Câmara Pestana

The Portuguese Independent Heavy Artillery Corps (Corpo de Artilharia Pesada Indepedente in Portuguese, Corps d'artillerie lourde portugais in French), or the CAPI, was a Portuguese railway heavy artillery unit that operated on the Western Front, during World War I.

The CAPI was created in response to a request from France for artillery support. It was independent from the much larger and better known Portuguese Expeditionary Corps, which also fought on the Western Front. The unit operated 320-millimetre (12.6 in), 240-mm and 190-mm railway guns, which were supplied by Britain, and operated under the control of the French Army. Most of the CAPI's personnel came from the Portuguese Army foot artillery branch, which in Portugal was responsible for manning the heavy guns of the coastal and garrison batteries. Other personnel came from the naval artillery.

== Organization ==
The CAPI was made up of:

- Headquarters and staff;
- Three mixed groups (battalions);
- Depot battery.

Each group consisted of three batteries, one of 320-mm guns, while the other two were equipped with either 190-mm or 240-mm guns.

== See also ==
- Portugal in World War I
