= Portuguese seizure of Central Powers' ships =

Primary catalyst of Portuguese entry into WWI

Portuguese seizure of German and Austro-Hungarian ships (1916)
- Part of World War I
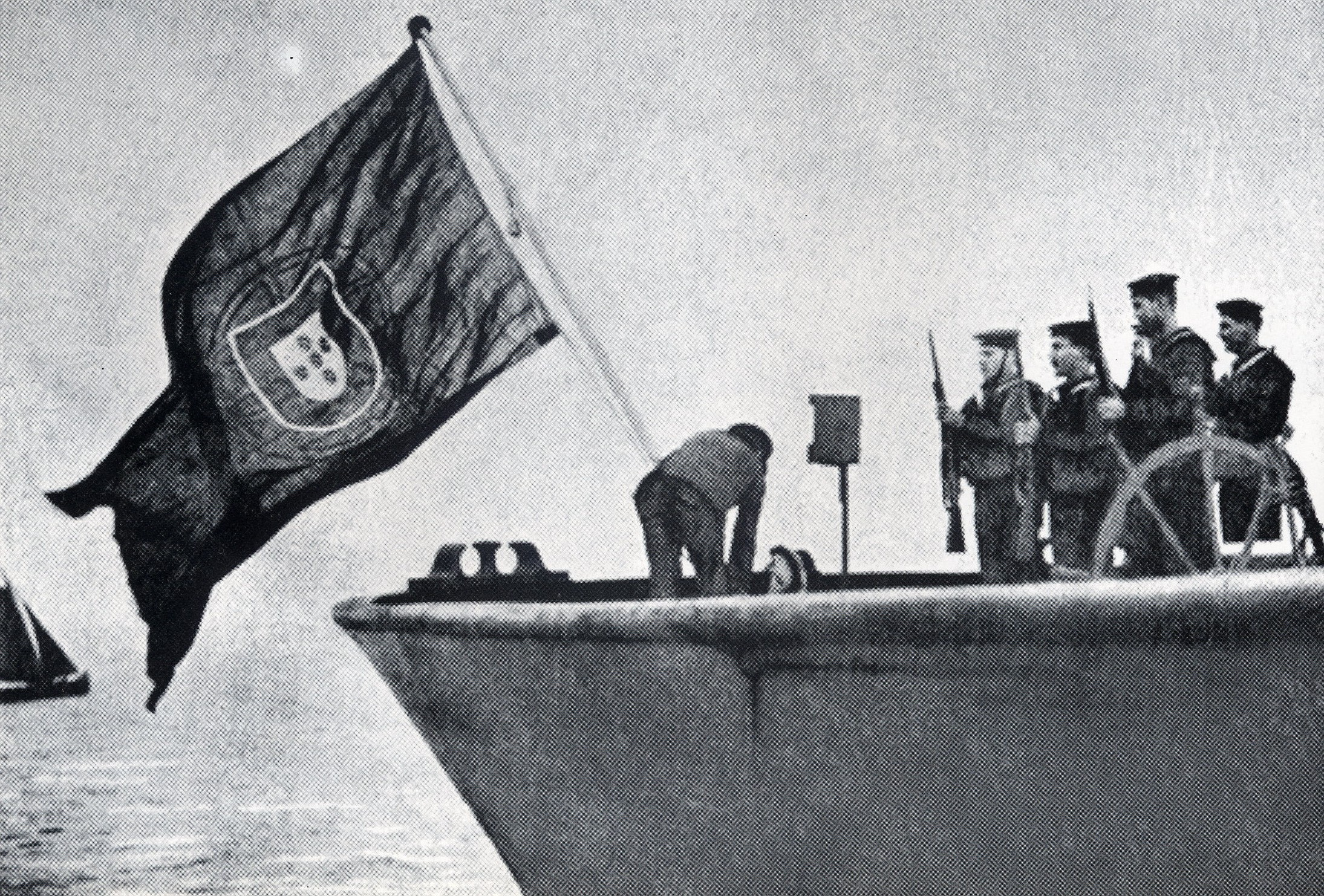
- Raising of the Portuguese flag on a German steamship by the Portuguese Navy
Date	23 February – 9 March 1916
Location	Portugal and its possessions (Note: The Central Powers had 75 ships anchored in Portuguese controlled ports, including Lisbon, Porto, Setúbal, Madeira, Cape Verde, Azores, Angola, Mozambique, and Portuguese India.)
Result	Portuguese victory: Germany and Austria-Hungary declare war on Portugal; Portugal formally joins the Allied powers

Belligerents
(First Portuguese Republic) Portugal	German Empire; Austria-Hungary

Commanders and leaders
(First Portuguese Republic) Leote do Rego (First Portuguese Republic) Bobela da Mota	(German Empire) Ludolf Carstens (POW) (Austria-Hungary) Bechtinger Telesforo (POW) …and others (Note: In Mormugão, the following commanders were captured: C. Wreesmann; Ludolf Carstens; Wilheim Sieghold; L. Kasch; Paul Hans Heinrich Voss; Bechtinger Telesforo; Other captives: Dr. Georg Schaede; H. Keel)

Strength
9 ships (Note: The Portuguese naval division consisted of 3 cruisers, 2 destroyers, 2 torpedoes, 1 submarine and 1 steamer.)	75 ships (Note: 73 German steamers and 2 Austro-Hungarian vessels.)

Casualties and losses
Unknown	72 ships captured 177 imprisoned

The Portuguese seizure of Central Powers' ships in 1916 was a naval operation resulting in the confiscation of 72 Austro-Hungarian and German ships by the First Portuguese Republic. Led by Captain Jaime Daniel Leote do Rego, these actions marked Portugal's entry into World War I.

== Background ==
Portugal experienced little internal violence after becoming a republic in 1910 and when World War I broke out in 1914, the nation was not immediately drawn into the conflict. However, its old alliance with Britain made it likely that, if involved, Portugal would support the Allied powers.

Despite not being officially at war, German and Portuguese forces frequently clashed at the border of Angola, but diplomatic ties remained in place.

On 17 February 1916, the British sent the Portuguese Government a formal request to, on behalf of the alliance, seize all German ships anchored on Portuguese ports.

== Seizures ==
=== Lisbon ===
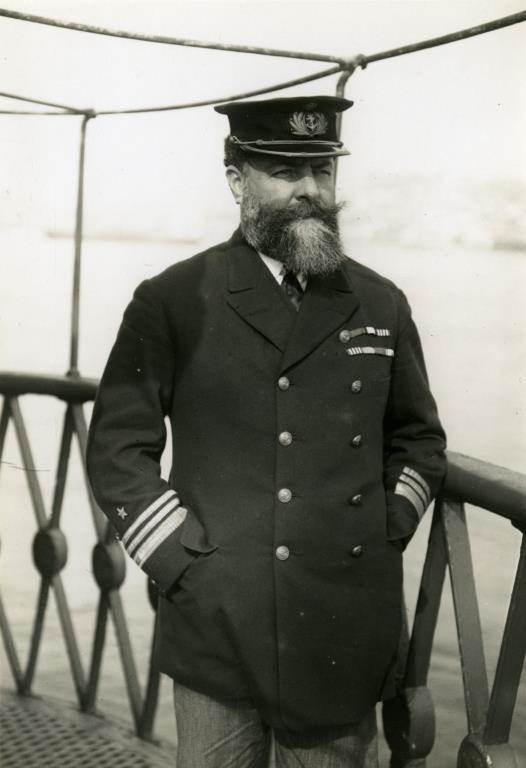
Then-Frigate Captain Jaime Daniel Leote do Rego

The situation changed on 23 February 1916, when then-Frigate Captain Jaime Daniel Leote do Rego led the seizure of 36 German and Austro-Hungarian ships anchored in the Tagus River, Lisbon. Rego, as commander of the naval division, organized the teams and assigned the military who carried out the seizure of the merchant ships anchored. At the same day, an Exchange Lisbon telegram claimed:

Captain Leote Rego, commander of the naval division, this afternoon at 4 o'clock, took forcible possession of 36 German and Austrian ships in the Tagus. When the Portuguese flag was hoisted the warships saluted with 21 guns.

At around 17:50, Vasco da Gama fired the 21-gun salute as Portuguese forces lowered the German flags and raised the national flag, officially placing the ships under Portuguese control.

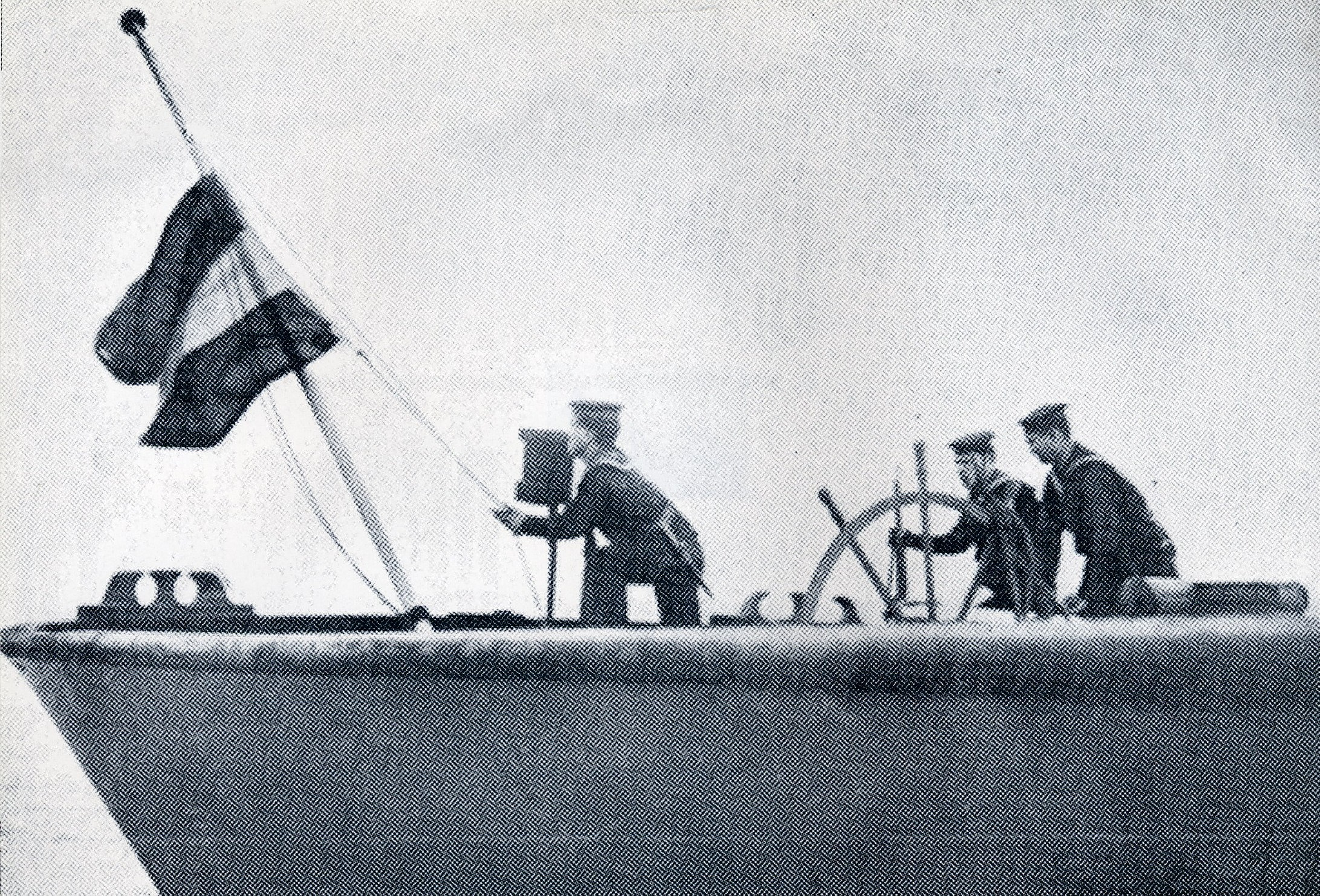
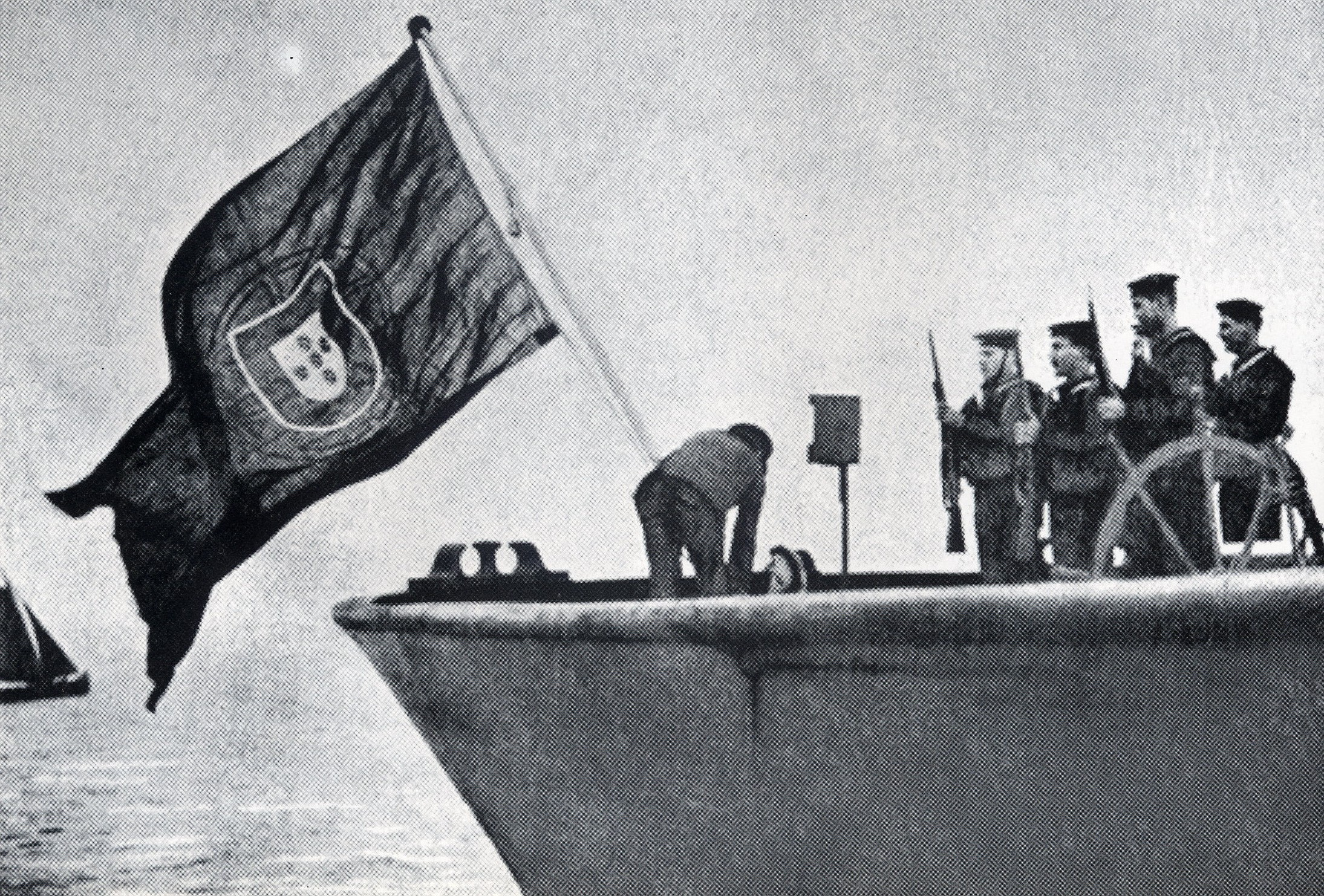
Raising of the Portuguese flag on a German steamship by the Portuguese Navy

=== Portuguese possessions ===
This action was followed by other seizures in Portuguese colonies and island possessions.

==== Cape Verde ====
On 25 February, Portugal seized eight German ships at São Vicente, Cape Verde, and announced that it intended to requisition German and Austro-Hungarian ships in other ports in Portugal and the Portuguese Empire. On 28 February, a German diplomatic note to Portugal protested that the seizure of the ships violated German treaty rights.

==== Mormugão, Goa ====
On 28 February, the Portuguese seized 5 German ships anchored in Mormugão, Goa. A total of 110 Germans were captured and interned in camps at Bicholim and Aguada fort.

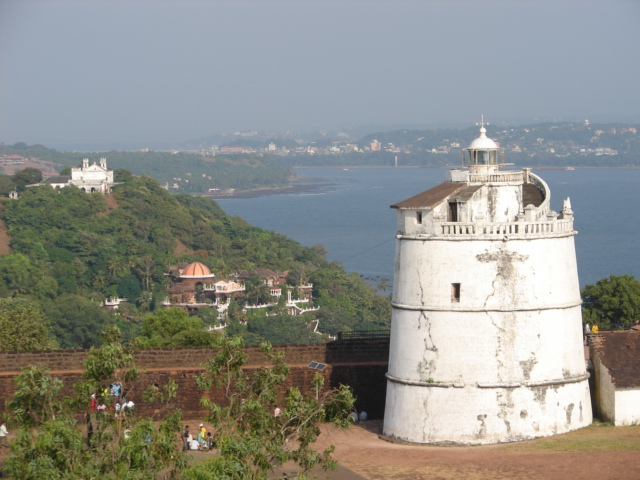
Fort Aguada, Goa

By 3 March, Portugal had seized all German ships at Mormugão. Later, on 10 July, Portugal also seized the Austro-Hungarian ship Vorwärts and detained 67 men. In total 177 men were made prisoners.

=== Outcome ===
By 9 March, 72 ships had been taken, two of them Austro-Hungarian. The seizures also secured Portugal a £2 million loan from Britain, as well as British protection.

== Aftermath ==
These actions were denied to be acts of war by Portuguese prime minister Afonso Costa, however, on 9 March 1916, Germany declared war on Portugal, followed by the severance of diplomatic relations with Austria-Hungary on 15 March 1916.

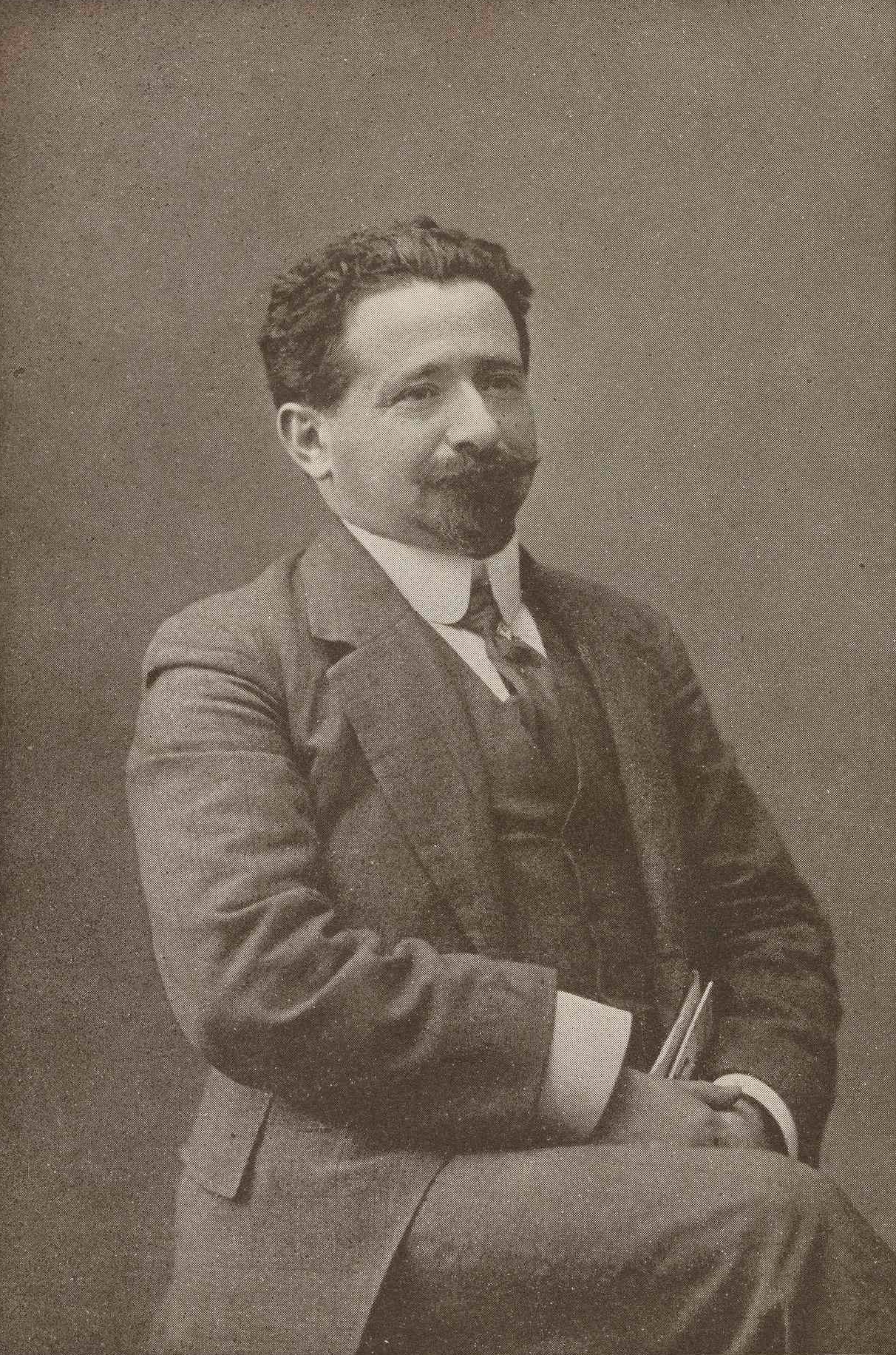
Prime Minister Afonso Costa, c. 1910

Afterward, Portugal sent troops to fight on the Western Front alongside French and British forces, and combat between Portuguese and German troops continued in both East and West Africa.

Of the seized ships, only 20 were retained by Portugal, 35% of total tonnage, while the rest were distributed to Britain, France, Italy, and Belgium. These vessels helped boost Portugal's merchant navy, but 38% were sunk by German submarines or lost in maritime disasters.

== Bibliography ==
- Castro Brandão, Miguel (2022). "War at Sea-Portugal, Navigation and Maritime Commerce during World War One". Essays in Economic & Business History. 39: 169–187.
- Baptista Valentim, Carlos Manuel (2018). "Jaime Daniel Leotte do Rego. O Comandante da Divisão Naval de Defesa e Instrução". Academia. pp. 56–58.
- Ward Parmelee, Katherine (1918). "The Flag of Portugal in History and Legend". The Romanic Review. 9 (1): 291–303.
