= SM U-141 =

World War I cruiser submarine (1918–1923)

History

German Empire
- Name: U-141
- Ordered: 1 August 1916
- Builder: Germaniawerft, Kiel
- Yard number: 302
- Launched: 9 January 1918
- Commissioned: 24 June 1918
- Fate: Surrendered 26 November 1918; sold for scrap 10 February 1923; broken up at Upnor.

General characteristics
- Class & type: Type U 139 submarine
- Displacement: 1,930 t (1,900 long tons) surfaced; 2,483 t (2,444 long tons) submerged
- Length: 92.00 m (301 ft 10 in) (o/a); 71.50 m (234 ft 7 in) (pressure hull)
- Beam: 9.12 m (29 ft 11 in) (o/a); 5.75 m (18 ft 10 in) (pressure hull)
- Height: 5.27 m (17 ft 3 in)
- Draught: 11.20 m (36 ft 9 in)
- Installed power: 2 × 3,500 PS (2,574 kW; 3,452 shp); 2 × 450 PS (331 kW; 444 shp) surfaced; 2 × 1,780 PS (1,309 kW; 1,756 shp) submerged
- Propulsion: 2 shafts, 2 × 2.10 m (6 ft 11 in) propellers
- Speed: 15.8 knots (29.3 km/h; 18.2 mph) surfaced; 7.6 knots (14.1 km/h; 8.7 mph) submerged
- Range: 17,750 nmi (32,870 km; 20,430 mi) at 8 knots (15 km/h; 9.2 mph) surfaced; 53 nmi (98 km; 61 mi) at 4.5 knots (8.3 km/h; 5.2 mph) submerged
- Test depth: 75 m (246 ft 1 in)
- Complement: 6 (1) officers, 56 (20) enlisted – (prize crew)
- Armament: 6 × 50 cm (19.7 in) torpedo tubes (four bow, two stern); 19-24 torpedoes; 2 × 15 cm (5.9 in) SK L/45 deck guns; 2 × 8.8 cm (3.5 in) SK L/30 deck guns

Service record
- Part of: U-Kreuzer Flotilla; Unknown start – 11 November 1918
- Commanders: Kptlt. Constantin Kolbe; 24 June – 11 November 1918
- Operations: none
- Victories: none

SM U-141 (Note: "SM" stands for "Seiner Majestät" (in English, "His Majesty's"); combined with the U for Unterseeboot would be translated as "His Majesty's Submarine".) was a Type U 139 submarine serving in the Imperial German Navy in World War I. U-141 was engaged in the naval warfare and took part in the First Battle of the Atlantic.

== Bibliography ==
- Gröner, Erich; Jung, Dieter; Maass, Martin (1991). U-boats and Mine Warfare Vessels. German Warships 1815–1945. Vol. 2. Translated by Thomas, Keith; Magowan, Rachel. London: Conway Maritime Press. ISBN 0-85177-593-4.
