= Portuguese Military Cemetery, Richebourg =

WWI cemetery in Pas-de-Calais, France

Richebourg-L'Avoue Portuguese National Cemetery
- Portugal
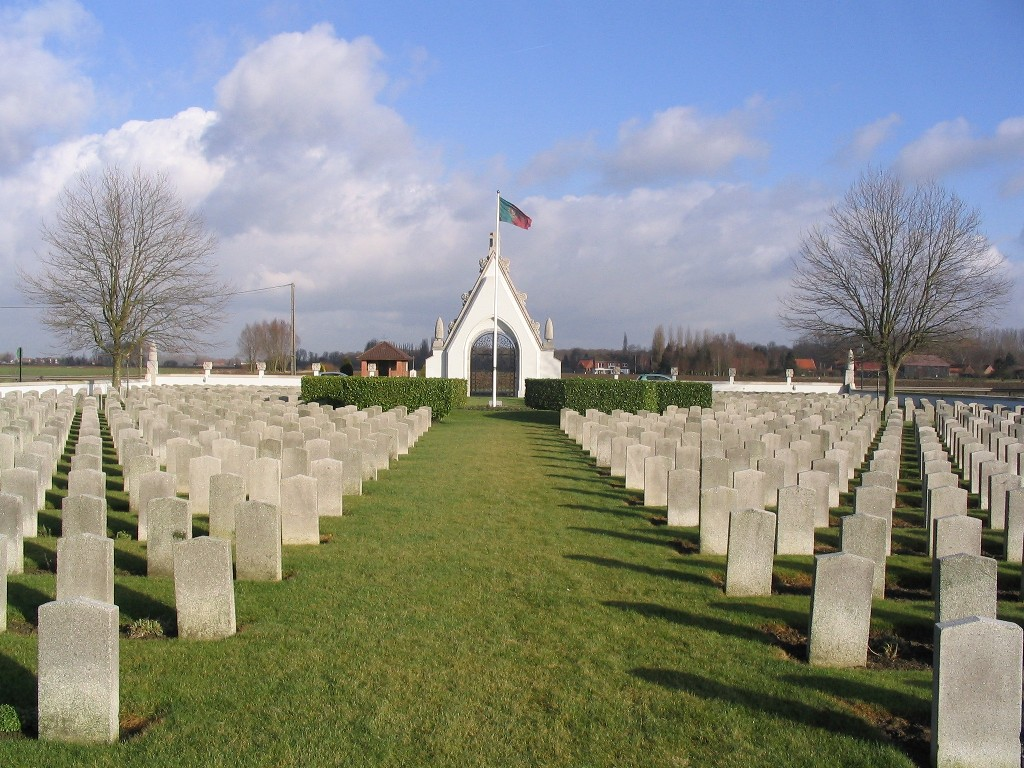
- Used for those deceased
- Established: 1923
- Location: 50.5736°N 2.7759°E near Richebourg, Pas-de-Calais, France
- Total burials: 1,831

Burials by nation
- Portugal

Burials by war
- World War I

UNESCO World Heritage Site
- Official name: Funerary and memory sites of the First World War (Western Front)
- Type: Cultural
- Criteria: i, ii, vi
- Designated: 2023 (45th session)
- Reference no.: 1567-PC02

The Portuguese Military Cemetery in Richebourg, Pas-de-Calais, France, is the burial site of 1,831 casualties of the Portuguese Expeditionary Corps in World War I. It is the only Portuguese military cemetery in France. The cemetery was built between 1924 and 1928 and a great number of its dead were killed in the Battle of the Lys in April 1918. A total of 238 are unidentified. Other burials were moved to the site from the rest of France, Belgium and German prisoner of war camps. In 1939, it was expanded from 1,500 graves to its present capacity.

In 2014, the cemetery was one of several across France and Belgium listed to be nominated to be UNESCO World Cultural Heritage sites.

President of France Emmanuel Macron and President of Portugal Marcelo Rebelo de Sousa led a ceremony of 2,000 invitees at the cemetery on the centenary of the start of the Battle of the Lys, 9 April 2018. The site was also visited by Portuguese president Jorge Sampaio (2004) and prime minister Pedro Passos Coelho (2014).

== Notable burials ==
- João Augusto Ferreira de Almeida (1894–1917), deserter, only Portuguese execution in World War I and last person executed by Portugal
