= João Augusto Ferreira de Almeida =

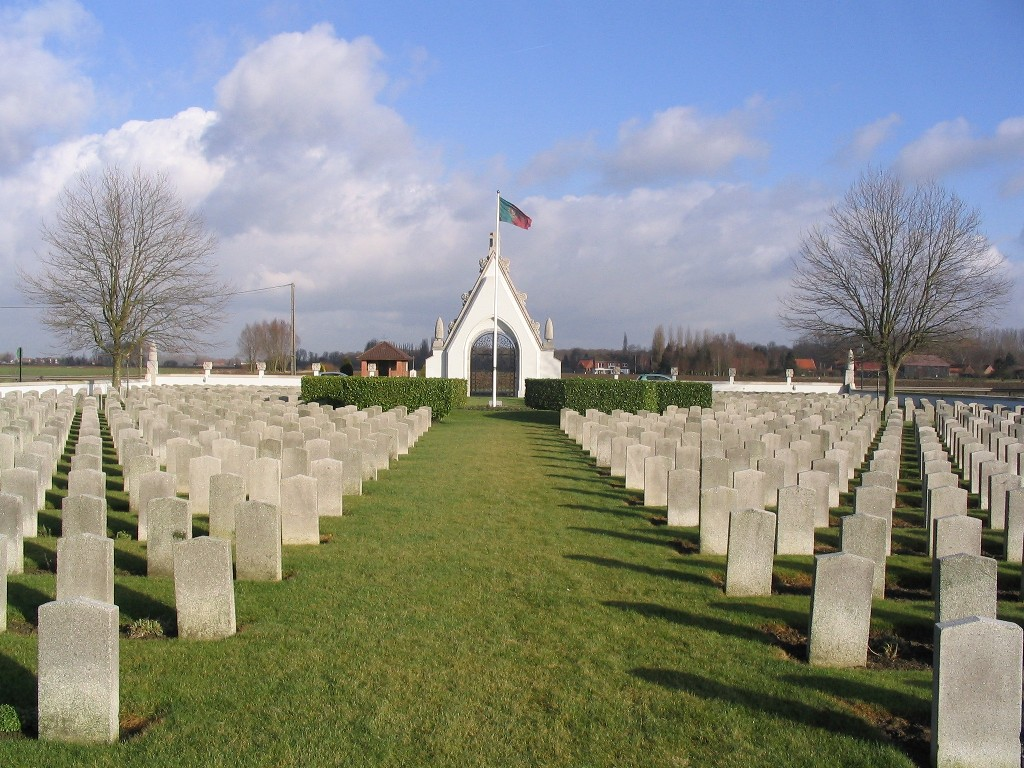
Ferreira de Almeida is buried with all other Portuguese casualties of the First World War at the Portuguese Military Cemetery in Richebourg

João Augusto Ferreira de Almeida (3 April 1894 — 16 September 1917) was a soldier in the Portuguese Expeditionary Corps of the First World War. After six months of combat, he was convicted of desertion by a court martial and executed by firing squad.

He was the only Portuguese soldier to be executed in the war, and the last person executed by Portugal. The death penalty for civilian crimes had been abolished in 1867 and in the military in 1911, but reinstated in 1916 for military crimes abroad during the theatre of war.

== Biography ==
Ferreira de Almeida was born in Foz do Douro, Porto to a father who was an organist and a mother who was a servant. He himself worked as a chauffeur to Adolfo Höfle, a wealthy German resident of the city.

In March 1917, he was sent from Lisbon to Brest, France as part of the 14th infantry battalion of the Portuguese Expeditionary Corps. In July, he was transferred to the 23rd, and also given a 60-day prison term for being absent without leave with the unit's water car, having driven 60 kilometres away to Wavrans. Days later, he disobeyed higher orders. On 29 July, he offered money to fellow soldiers to take him over enemy lines, where he would share maps of Allied positions with the Germans.

In August 1917, Ferreira de Almeida faced a court martial and the penalty of death and dishonourable discharge. His defence appealed that the latter punishment was abolished in 1911, so the trial was annulled until the following month. The defence claimed that he was mentally ill, but this was never submitted to judges. On 12 September he was sentenced to death, and shot four days later by a platoon of eleven men. One, Sergeant Teófilo Antunes Saraiva, did not shoot and was investigated for disobeying orders; it was found that the safety lock on his gun was defective.

== Legacy ==
Ferreira de Almeida was initially buried in the cemetery of local Laventie, Pas-de-Calais, but was eventually interred with all other Portuguese casualties at the Portuguese Military Cemetery in nearby Richebourg.

On the centenary of the execution and 150th anniversary of the abolition of the death penalty for civilian crimes, President of Portugal Marcelo Rebelo de Sousa released an official statement requesting the "moral rehabilitation" of Ferreira de Almeida, who had been given a "punishment contrary to human rights". The statement was not an official pardon.
