= Friedrich von Arnauld de la Perière =

German aviator (1888–1969)

Friedrich von Arnauld de la Perière (17 June 1888 in Breslau – 12 October 1969 in Friedrichshafen) was a German aviator and Generalleutnant of the Luftwaffe.

He dropped the first bombs on England in World War I.

== Websites ==
- http://www.balsi.de/Homepage-Generale/Luftwaffe/A/Arnauld-de-la-Periere-Friedrich-von.htm
