= SM U-139 =

German WWI submarine

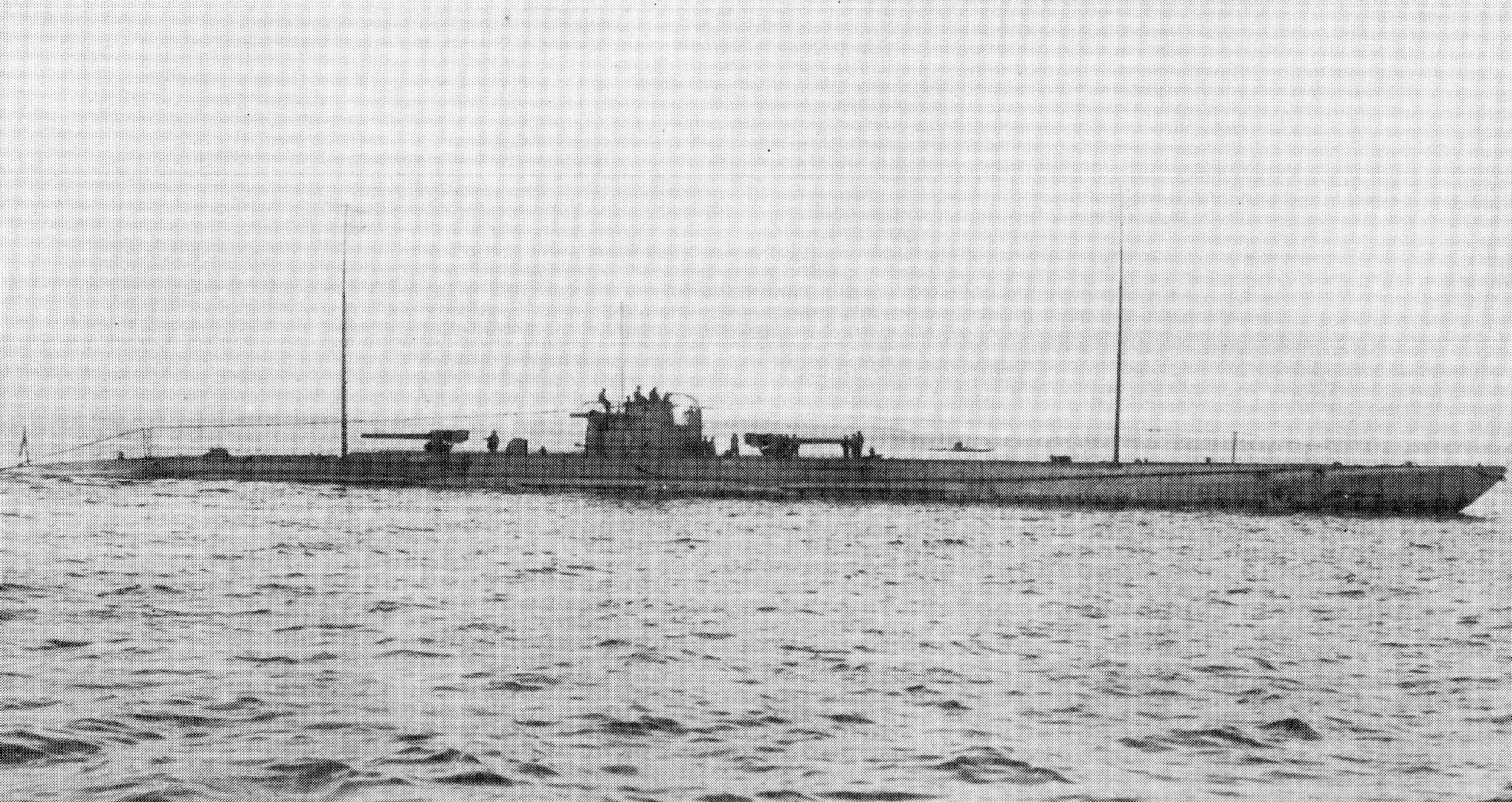
- German U-boat U-139

History

German Empire
- Name: U-139
- Ordered: 1 August 1916
- Builder: Germaniawerft, Kiel
- Yard number: 300
- Launched: 3 December 1917
- Commissioned: 18 May 1918
- Renamed: Halbronn
- Fate: Surrendered to France on 24 November 1918

France
- Name: Halbronn
- Acquired: 24 November 1918
- Decommissioned: 24 July 1935
- Fate: Broken up

General characteristics
- Class & type: Type U 139 submarine
- Displacement: 1,930 t (1,900 long tons) surfaced; 2,483 t (2,444 long tons) submerged
- Length: 92.00 m (301 ft 10 in) (o/a); 71.50 m (234 ft 7 in) (pressure hull)
- Beam: 9.12 m (29 ft 11 in) (o/a); 5.75 m (18 ft 10 in) (pressure hull)
- Height: 5.27 m (17 ft 3 in)
- Draught: 11.20 m (36 ft 9 in)
- Installed power: 2 × 3,300 PS (2,427 kW; 3,255 shp); 2 × 450 PS (331 kW; 444 shp) surfaced; 2 × 1,780 PS (1,309 kW; 1,756 shp) submerged
- Propulsion: 2 shafts, 2 × 2.10 m (6 ft 11 in) propellers
- Speed: 15.3 knots (28.3 km/h; 17.6 mph) surfaced; 7.6 knots (14.1 km/h; 8.7 mph) submerged
- Range: 12,630 nmi (23,390 km; 14,530 mi) at 8 knots (15 km/h; 9.2 mph) surfaced; 53 nmi (98 km; 61 mi) at 4.5 knots (8.3 km/h; 5.2 mph) submerged
- Test depth: 75 m (246 ft 1 in)
- Complement: 6 (1) officers, 56 (20) enlisted – (prize crew)
- Armament: 6 × 50 cm (19.7 in) torpedo tubes (four bow, two stern); 19-24 torpedoes; 2 × 15 cm (5.9 in) SK L/45 deck guns

Service record
- Part of: U-Kreuzer Flotilla; Unknown start – 11 November 1918
- Commanders: Kptlt. Lothar von Arnauld de la Perière; 18 May – 11 November 1918
- Operations: 1 patrol
- Victories: 3 merchant ships sunk (6,301 GRT); 1 auxiliary warship sunk (487 GRT); 1 auxiliary warship damaged (2,502 GRT)

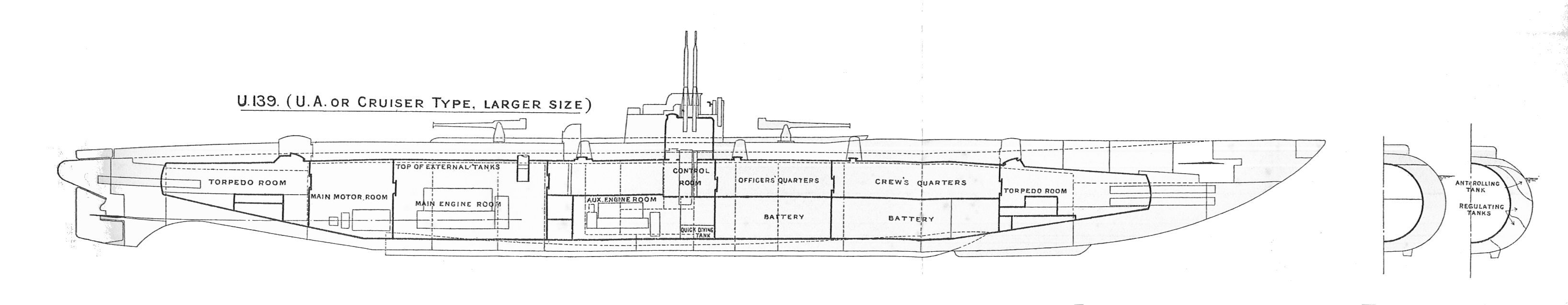
U-139 Side Profile

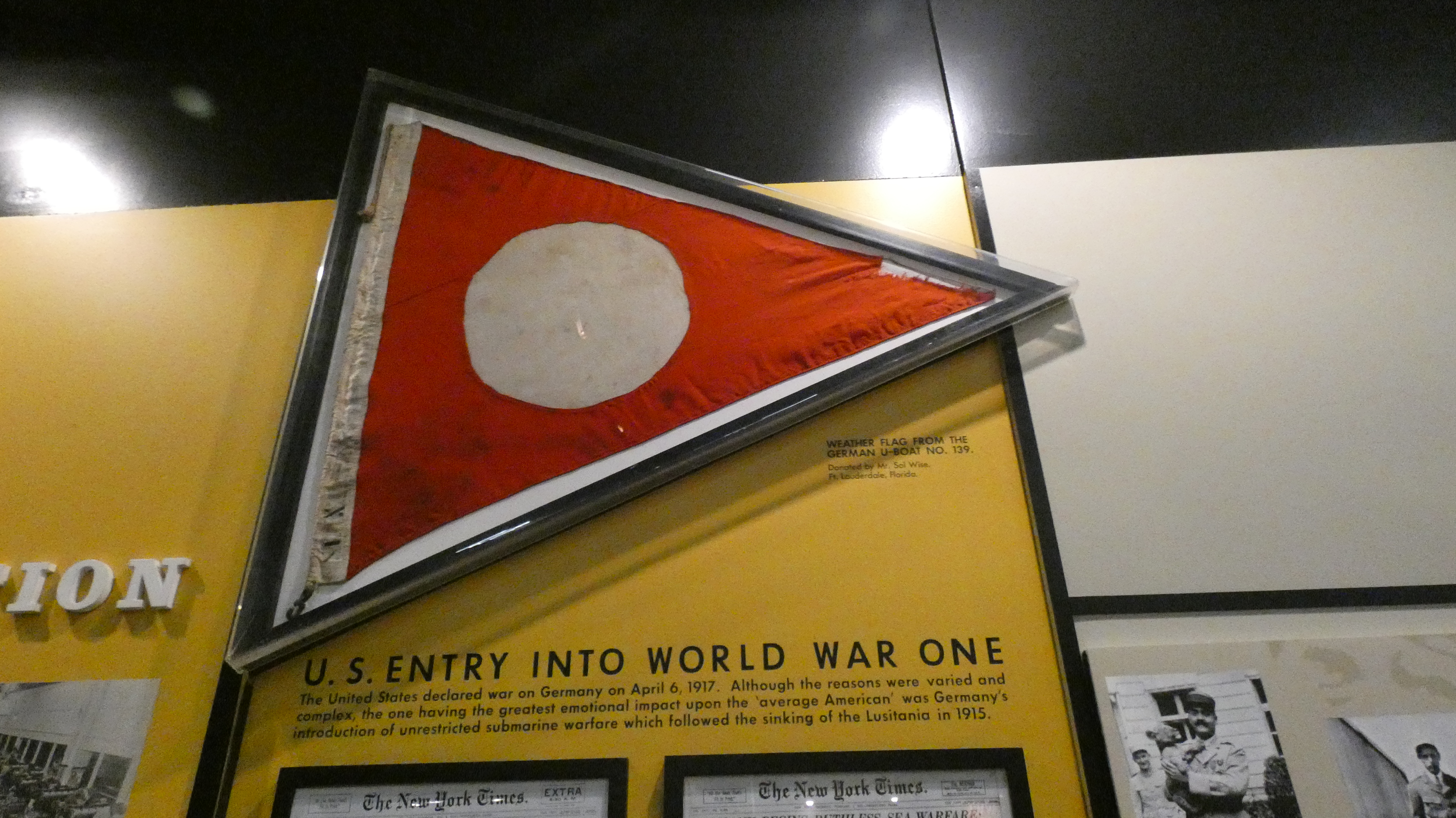
Weather flag of SM U-139 at the National Museum of the United States Air Force.

SM U-139 was the lead ship of her class of cruiser submarines serving in the Imperial German Navy in World War I. She was commissioned on 18 May 1918 under the command of Lothar von Arnauld de la Perière, who named the submarine Kapitänleutnant Schwieger, after Walther Schwieger, who had sunk the Lusitania in 1915. She only sailed on one war patrol, during which she sank four ships. U-139 surrendered to France on 24 November 1918 and shortly afterwards became French submarine Halbronn (until 24 July 1935 when she was broken up).

== Action of 14 October 1918 ==
On the 14 October 1918, U-139 attacked the Portuguese civilian steamer SS São Miguel, which was being escorted by the Portuguese Navy small naval trawler NRP Augusto de Castilho in the Atlantic Ocean. Augusto Castilho covered the escape of São Miguel by engaging U-139 for several hours, until being destroyed.

== Summary of raiding history ==
Date	Name	Nationality	Tonnage (Note: Merchant ship tonnages are in gross register tons. Military vessels are listed by tons displacement.)	Fate
1 October 1918	Bylands	United Kingdom	3,309	Sunk
1 October 1918	Manin	Kingdom of Italy	2,691	Sunk
1 October 1918	HMS Perth	Royal Navy	2,502	Damaged
2 October 1918	Rio Cavado	Portugal	301	Sunk
14 October 1918	Augusto De Castilho	Portuguese Navy	487	Sunk

== Bibliography ==
- Gröner, Erich; Jung, Dieter; Maass, Martin (1991). U-boats and Mine Warfare Vessels. German Warships 1815–1945. Vol. 2. Translated by Thomas, Keith; Magowan, Rachel. London: Conway Maritime Press. ISBN 0-85177-593-4.
