= Lothar von Arnauld de la Perière =

Vizeadmiral of the German Navy

Vizeadmiral Lothar von Arnauld de la Perière
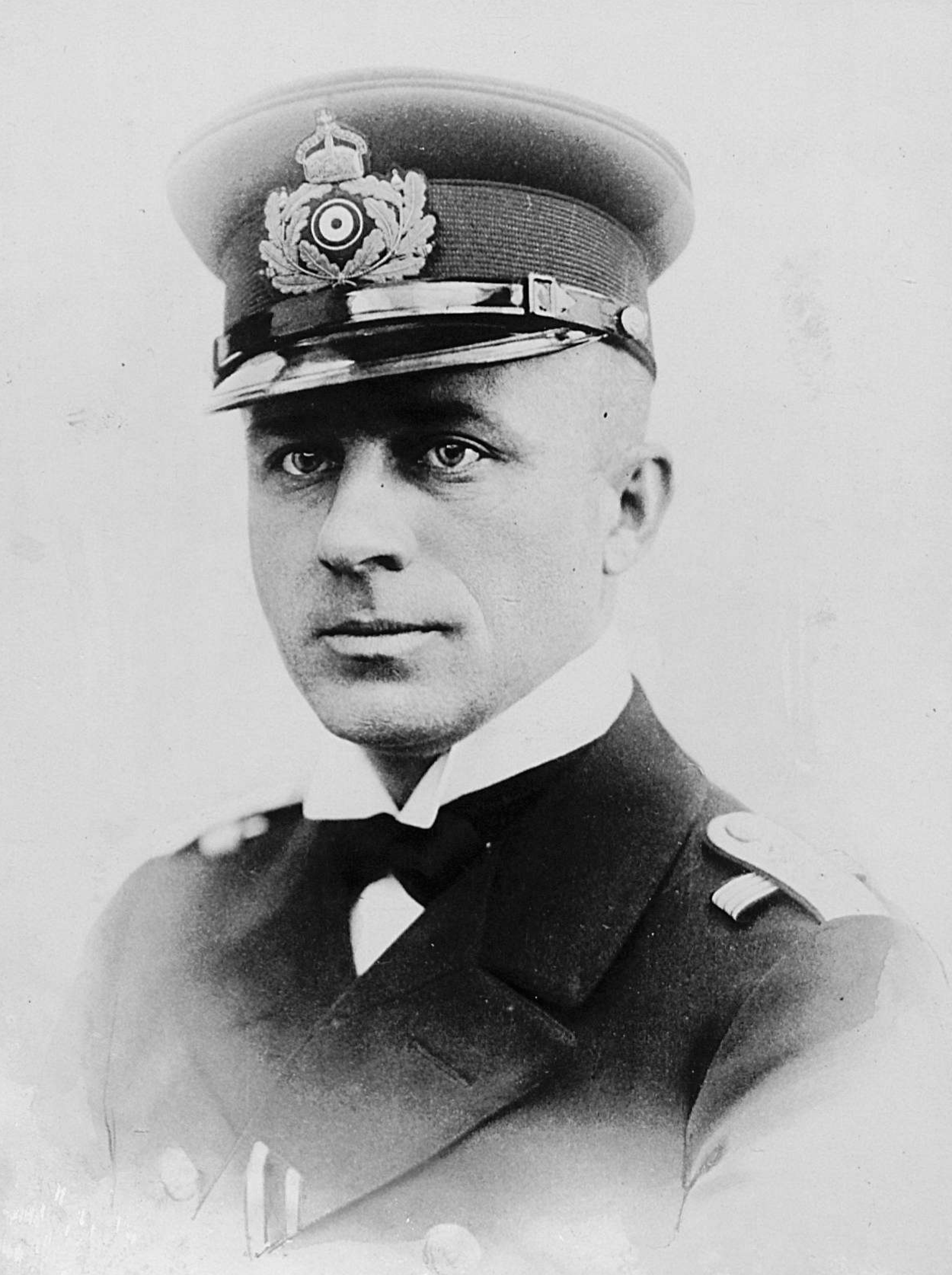
- Lothar von Arnauld de la Perière
- Born: 18 March 1886; Posen (today Poznań), German Empire
- Died: 24 February 1941 (aged 54); Le Bourget, France
- Burial place: Invalidenfriedhof Berlin
- Relatives: Friedrich von Arnauld de la Perière (brother)
- Military career
- Allegiance: German Empire; Weimar Republic; Nazi Germany
- Branch: Imperial German Navy; Reichsmarine; Kriegsmarine
- Service years: 1903–31, 1939–41
- Rank: Vizeadmiral
- Commands: U-35; U-139; Emden
- Conflicts: World War I; World War II
- Awards: Pour le Mérite; Iron Cross First and Second Class; House Order of Hohenzollern

Vizeadmiral Lothar von Arnauld de la Perière (German: [ˈloːtaʁ fɔn ʔaʁˈnoː də la peˈʁi̯ɛːɐ̯]; 18 March 1886 – 24 February 1941), born in Posen, Prussia, and of French-German descent, was a German U-boat commander during World War I. With 194 ships and 453,716 gross register tons (GRT) sunk, he is the most successful submarine captain ever. His victories came in the Mediterranean, almost always using his 8.8 cm deck gun. During his career, he fired 74 torpedoes, hitting 39 times.

Arnauld de la Perière remained in the German Navy (Reichsmarine) after the war ended. During World War II, he was recalled to active duty as a rear admiral, and was killed when his plane crashed on takeoff close to Le Bourget Airport near Paris in 1941.

== First World War ==
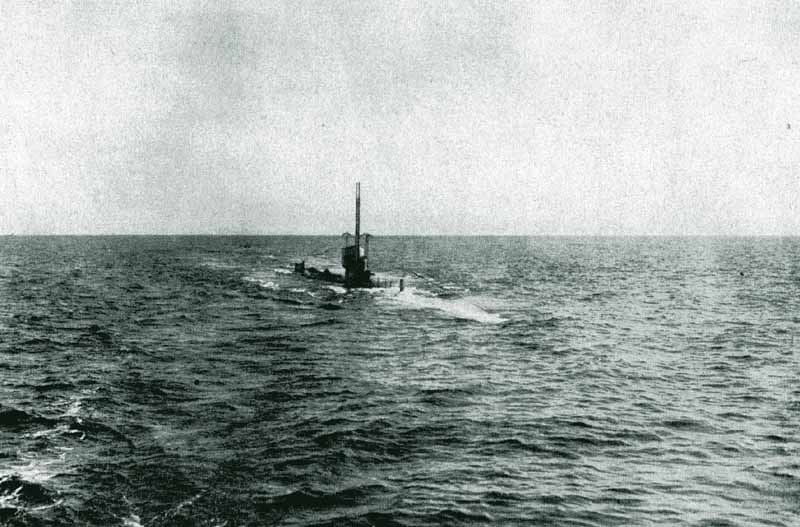
U-35 in the Mediterranean Sea

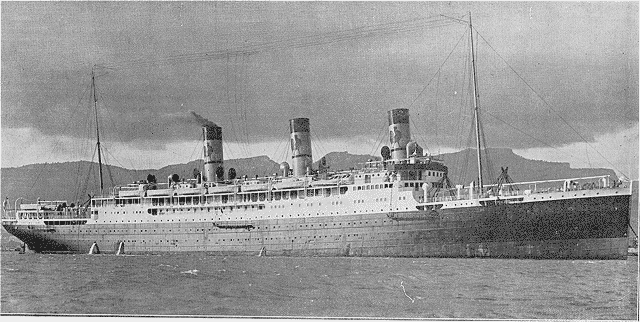
Troopship Gallia

Arnauld de la Perière entered the Kaiserliche Marine in 1903. After serving on the battleships SMS Kurfürst Friedrich Wilhelm, Schlesien and Schleswig-Holstein, he served as torpedo officer on the light cruiser SMS Emden from 1911 to 1913.

At the outbreak of the First World War, Arnauld de la Perière served as an adjutant to admiral Hugo von Pohl in Berlin. On mobilization, he was transferred to an active post where he served in the Marine-Luftschiff-Abteilung. In 1915, Arnauld de la Perière transferred to the U-boat command. After a course in Pula, he was given command of the U-35 in November 1915. He made 14 voyages with the U-35 during which he sank 189 merchant vessels and two gunboats for a total of 446,708 GRT. One of his victories was the French troop carrier SS Gallia, which sank with great loss of life. Transferred to the U-139 in May 1918, he sank a further five ships with a combined tonnage of 7,008 GRT. His record number of sunken tonnage and number of sunken ships is unsurpassed since then. For his service, he was awarded the Iron Cross, second and first class, and the Pour le Mérite in 1916.

Unusually among U-boat captains of the First World War, de la Perière was admired and respected by his opponents, in part because he preferred using his U-boat's deck gun to its torpedoes; he was well-known for an incident near the end of the war in which he attacked a convoy not by stealth but by remaining on the surface and fighting a gunnery duel with the escorting warship. He also had a reputation for treating non-combatant sailors well and for risking his own boat to save sailors in the water.

== Interbellum ==
After the war, Arnauld de la Perière stayed in a vastly reduced German Navy. During the 1920s, he served as navigation officer on the old pre-dreadnoughts SMS Hannover and SMS Elsass. From 24 September 1928 to 10 October 1930, he commanded the light cruiser Emden. Promoted to captain in 1931, he was put on the retired list. He then taught at the Turkish Naval Academy from 1932 to 1938.

== Second World War ==
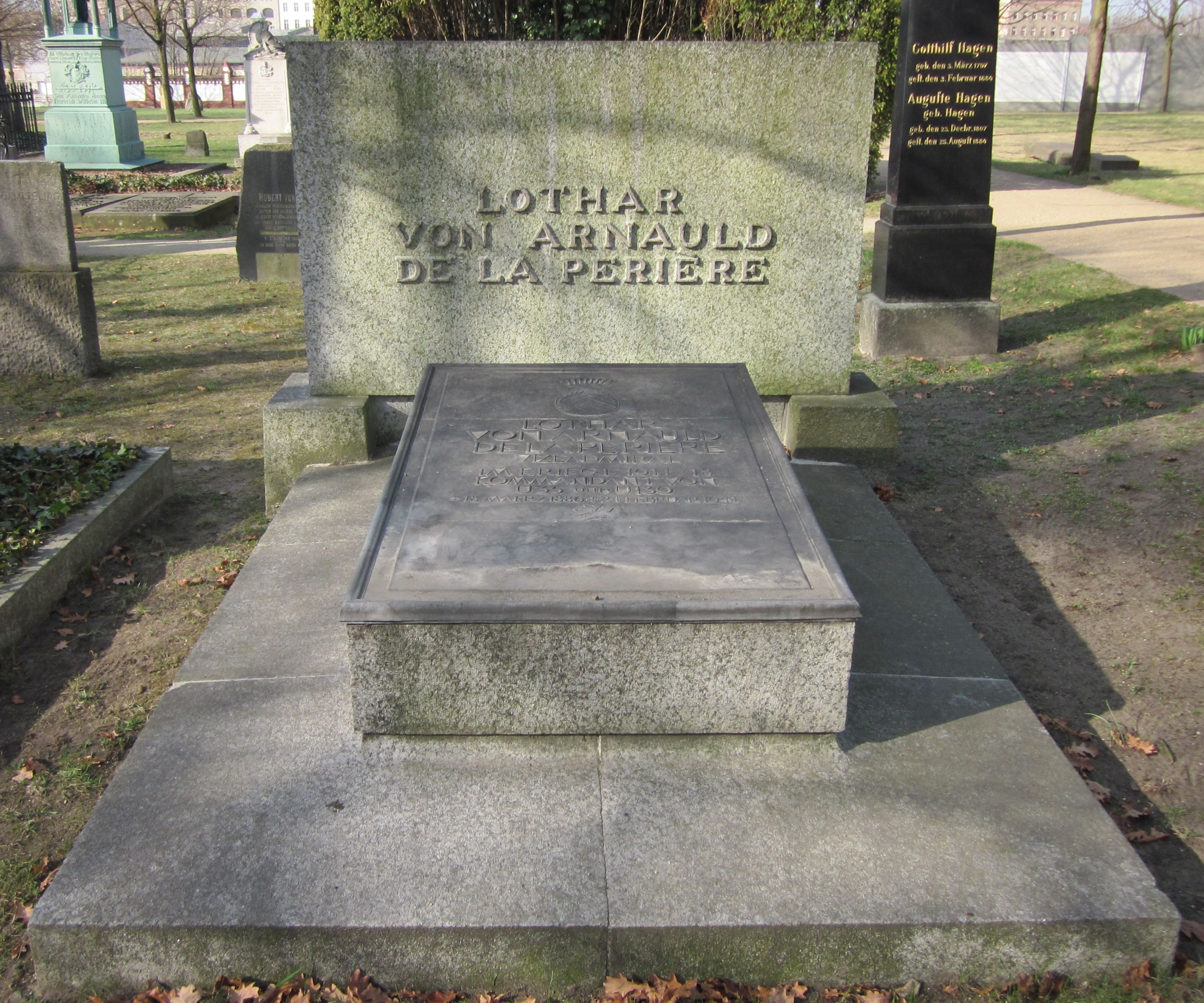
Grave in the Invalidenfriedhof in Berlin

At the start of World War II, Arnauld de la Perière was again called up for active duty. Until March 1940, he served as naval commandant in Danzig until he was sent to the Low Countries as naval commandant for Belgium and the Netherlands. Promoted to Konteradmiral Arnauld de la Perière was made naval commandant in Brittany and later for the entire western French seacoast. He was promoted to Vizeadmiral on 1 February 1941. Transferred to take up command of Navy Group South, he was killed on 24 February 1941 when his plane crashed on takeoff near Le Bourget Airport. He is buried in Berlin at the Invalidenfriedhof.

== Awards ==
- Pour le Mérite (11 October 1916)
- Iron Cross (1914), 1st and 2nd classes
- Knight's Cross of the Royal House Order of Hohenzollern with swords
- Order of the Crown, 4th class
- U-boat War Badge (1918)
- Service Award Cross
- Hanseatic Cross Hamburg
- Knight's Cross of the Imperial Austrian Order of Leopold with war decoration
- Order of the Iron Crown, 3rd class with War Decoration (Austria-Hungary)
- Military Merit Cross, 3rd class with War Decoration (Austria-Hungary)
- Silver Liakat Medal with swords
- Gallipoli Star (Ottoman Empire)
