= Coat of arms of the Azores =

- Armiger: Azores Autonomous Region
- Adopted: 10 April 1979
- Crest: A goshawk issuant azure, beaked and langued gules, charged with nine mullets of five points or
- Shield: Argent a goshawk displayed azure, beaked and membered gules, on a bordure of the last nine mullets of five points or
- Supporters: Two bulls sable, collared and chained or, dexter sustaining a banner of the Order of Christ, with lance azure, tip and guard or, and sinister sustaining a banner gules, a dove displayed argent, with lance azure, tip and guard or
- Motto: Portuguese: Antes morrer livres que em paz sujeitos.

The coat of arms of the Azores is nine gold stars superimposed on a red bordure, representing the nine islands of the archipelago. The bordure surrounds a silver shield on which a blue goshawk is displayed with wings elevated and with red feet, beak, and tongue. The crest is a closed helm in gold lined with red, surmounted by a wreath and mantling of silver and blue, topped by another blue eagle on which are superimposed the same nine gold stars.

The shield is supported by two chained black bulls, above a scroll containing the motto Antes morrer livres que em paz sujeitos (English: Rather die free than in peace be subjugated). The supporters each hold a flagpole. Their collars, chains, and hooves are gold, their horns silver. The flags bear Christian symbols. The flag dexter, that is, on the viewer's left, is the red cross of the Portuguese Order of Christ on a white field. The flag sinister, that is, on the viewer's right, is a white dove superimposed on gold rays in the shape of a cross - the emblem of the Holy Spirit - on a red field, both flags bordered in gold.

Early Portuguese visitors mistook the local variety of buzzard, Buteo buteo rothschildi, for goshawks (Accipiter gentilis) and the Portuguese word for "goshawk", açor (pl. açores), is the root of the islands' name. Goshawks also remain a common motif in Azorean heraldry and vexillology.

== Blazon ==
The coat of arms was officially adopted by the Regional Decree n.º 4/79/A, published in the Diary of the Republic n.º 84/1979. It is blazoned in the article 3 as follows:

a) Shield: Argent, a goshawk displayed azure, beaked, langued, taloned and armed gules, a bordure gules, charged with nine mullets of five points or;

b) Helm: affronté, or, lined gules;

c) Crest: a goshawk issuant azure, beaked and langued gules, charged with nine mullets of five points or;

d) Mantling: azure and argent;

e) Supporters: two bulls sable, collared and chained or, dexter sustaining a banner of the Order of Christ, with lance azure, tip and guard or, and sinister sustaining a banner gules, a dove displayed argent, with lance azure, tip and guard or;

f) Motto: "Antes morrer livres que em paz sujeitos", translating roughly to "[We would] rather die free than [live] subjugated in peace".

== See also ==
- Coat of arms of Portugal
- Goshawk
- Flag of the Azores
- Hymn of the Azores
