= Autonomous regions of Portugal =

Autonomous administrative division of Portugal

Autonomous region
- Category: 1st-level administrative division
- Location: Portugal
- Created by: Constitution
- Created: 1976
- Number: 2
- Populations: 246,746 (Azores); 267,785 (Madeira)
- Areas: 2,333 km^{2} (Azores); 801 km^{2} (Madeira)
- Government: Regional Assembly Regional Government Representative of the Republic
- Subdivisions: Municipalities; Civil Parishes

The two autonomous regions of Portugal from 1999 (Portuguese: regiões autónomas de Portugal) are the Azores (Região Autónoma dos Açores) and Madeira (Região Autónoma da Madeira). Together with Continental Portugal (Portugal Continental), they form the Portuguese Republic.

== History ==
The autonomous regions were established in 1976 in the aftermath of the Carnation Revolution, which saw Portugal end its colonial empire. Some areas, such as the Azores, Madeira and Macau, were deemed either impractical to decolonise or too close in ties to Continental Portugal to make independent. However, due to their distinct geography, economy, social and cultural situation, as well as historical aspirations of autonomy in Madeira and the Azores, the autonomous regions were formed. When formed in 1976, there were two autonomous regions - the Azores and Madeira. Macau, on the southwestern coast of China, remained a Portuguse colony, with a higher degree of autonomy when compared to the Azores and Madeira, until it was handed over to China in 1999 after 442 years of Portuguese control.

== Constitution ==
Although the regions are politically and administratively autonomous, the Portuguese constitution specifies both a regional and national connection, obliging their administrations to maintain democratic principles and promote regional interests, while still reinforcing national unity. The third clause of article 255 of the Portuguese Constitution specifically points to maintenance of national integrity and sovereignty of the Portuguese State.

== Administration ==
As defined by the Portuguese constitution and other laws, an autonomous region possesses its own political and administrative statute and has its own government. The branches of Government are the regional executive (Governo Regional) and the legislative assembly (known as the Assembleia Legislativa Regional). The assembly is elected by universal suffrage, using the D'Hondt method of proportional representation.

Originally, the sovereignty of the Portuguese Republic was represented in each autonomous region by the Minister of the Republic (Ministro da República), proposed by the Government of the Republic and appointed by the President of the Republic. After the sixth amendment to the Portuguese Constitution was passed in 2006, the Minister of the Republic was replaced by a less-powerful Representative of the Republic (Representante da República) who is appointed by the President, after listening to the Government, but otherwise it is a presidential prerogative.

The president of the regional executive (the Presidente do Governo Regional) is appointed by the Representative of the Republic according to the results of the election to the legislative assemblies.

Current Presidents of the Regional Executive:

- Azores – José Manuel Bolieiro (Social Democratic Party);
- Madeira – Miguel Albuquerque (Social Democratic Party).

== Powers ==
Flag of the Azores

Flag of Madeira

The competences of the autonomous regions are defined in the Constitution and the respective Statutes. Looking at the Constitution (Article 227), the powers of the autonomous regions are, in particular, to:

- Approving legislative acts in the form of regional legislative decrees;
- Approving regulations on national and regional legislation;
- Exercising their own executive power;
- Exercising their own tax power, within certain limits;
- Creating, extinguishing and exercising tutelage over local authorities;
- Defining illicit acts of mere social order and respective sanctions.

With regard to regional legislation, it should be emphasised that the first three subparagraphs of Article 227 of the Portuguese Constitution are not applicable to local authorities. The Legislative Assemblies of the Autonomous Regions are competent to:

- Legislate on matters contained in the Political-Administrative Statutes, in matters not reserved to sovereign bodies;
- Legislate on matters authorised by the Assembly of the Republic under certain terms and develop for the regional scope the principles or general bases of the legal regimes contained in laws that are limited to them.

=== Specific competences of the Autonomous Regions ===
- Demographic policy, emigration and the status of residents;
- Control over local authorities and their territorial demarcation;
- Guidance, direction, coordination and supervision of public services and institutes and nationalized or public companies nationalized or public companies that carry out their activities exclusively or predominantly in the predominantly in the region and in other cases where the regional interest justifies it;
- Maritime and air transport and infrastructures, including stopovers and tariffs;
- Administration of ports and airports, including port and airport taxes and charges between islands and
- Port and airport administration, including port and airport taxes and charges between islands and between islands and abroad;
- Fisheries and aquaculture;
- Agriculture, forestry, livestock;
- Legal regime and exploitation of land, including rural leasing;
- Soil policy, land use planning and ecological balance;
- Water, mineral and thermal resources;
- Local energy production;
- Health and social security;
- Labor, employment and vocational training;
- Pre-school, basic, secondary, higher and special education;
- Classification, protection and enhancement of cultural heritage;
- Museums, libraries and archives;
- Public shows and entertainment;
- Sports;
- Tourism and hotels;
- Handicrafts and folklore;
- Expropriation, for public utility, of assets located in the Region, as well as requisition
- Public works and social equipment;
- National Electoral Commission
- Housing and urban planning;
- Social communication;
- Internal and external trade and supplies;
- Foreign direct investment and technology transfer;
- Mobilization of savings generated in the region with a view to financing investments made in the region;
- Industrial development;
- Adapting the tax system to the regional economic reality;
- Granting tax benefits;
- Coordination of the Regional Civil Protection Service with the relevant national entities;
- Regional statistics;
- Forests, parks and nature reserves;
- Roads, traffic and land transportation;
- Waterfront;
- Enhancement of human resources and quality of life;
- Environmental protection and ecological balance;
- Protection of nature and natural resources, as well as public, animal and plant health.
- Organization of the regional administration and the services within it, including those of central administration;
- Maintenance of public order;
- Inter-regional cooperation and dialogue under the terms of Article 227(1)(u) of the Constitution of the Constitution;
- Construction, installation or use of military bases, as well as related infrastructure and related equipment;
- Construction, installation or use of infrastructures for observation purposes, study and scientific research;
- Other matters that exclusively concern the Region or that take on a particular particular configuration.

=== Revenue ===
The following shall constitute revenue of the Autonomous Regions:

- Income from its assets;
- All taxes, fees, fines, penalties and additional charges levied in its territory, including stamp duty;
- Taxes levied on goods destined for the Region and paid outside its territory, including VAT;
- Other taxes that should belong to it, under the terms of this Statute and the law, namely according to the place where the taxable event occurs;
- Benefits arising from international treaties and agreements directly concerning the Region, as defined in Article 1 of these Bylaws;
- Proceeds from loans;
- Financial support from the State, namely that to which the Region is entitled, in accordance with the principle of national solidarity;
- Proceeds from the issue of stamps and coins of numismatic interest;
- Support from the European Communities;
- Revenues from privatisations in accordance with the provisions of the framework law provided for in Article 85(1) of the Constitution.

== See also ==
- Legislative Assembly of Azores
- Legislative Assembly of Madeira
