= Flag of the Azores =

Portuguese regional flag

Azores
- Use: Civil and state flag
- Proportion: 2:3
- Adopted: 10 April 1979; 47 years ago
- Design: Blue and white bands, superimposed by golden goshawk and surmounted by nine stars with traditional Portuguese shield in the left corner.

The flag of the Azores (Portuguese: bandeira dos Açores) is the regional flag of the Portuguese Autonomous Region of the Azores. It is a rectangular bicolour with a field unevenly divided into blue on the hoist, and white on the fly.

It was adopted on 10 April 1979 by the Regional Assembly of the Azores, being based on the national flag of Portugal used between 1830 and 1910.

== Design ==
The flag construction follows the same proportions and other features of those present in the Flag of Portugal.

Its length is equal to 1.5 times its width, corresponding with an aspect ratio of 2:3.

The field is vertically divided into two colours: blue on the hoist side, and white on the fly, with blue spanning 40% of the length and white spanning the remaining 60%.

Positioned over the border between the blue and the white fields are nine five-sided golden stars in a semi-circular arch over a naturalistic designed golden goshawk, with its wings extended. The top left canton of the flag contains the Portuguese coat of arms.

== History ==
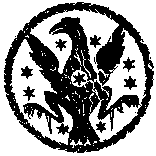
Early 19th century seal of the Azores

The 1830-1910 flag of Portugal, first raised on Terceira Island

Flag used by the 1876 autonomist movement

Flag of the 1975 Azores Liberation Front

The Azores and its flag are deeply connected to the historical Flag of Portugal used between 1830 and 1910.

In 1828, the Azorean island of Terceira was taken by the Portuguese Liberals in an event that triggered the Liberal Wars, a civil conflict that opposed the Liberal party headed by the ex-King Peter IV (Emperor Peter I of Brazil) to the Miguelite party headed by his brother King Michael I. The city of Angra at the Terceira, became then the provisional capital of the Regency Council headed by the prominent count of Vila Flor (future first duke of Terceira), governing in the name of the Queen Mary II, daughter of Peter IV.

By decree of 18 October 1830, the Regency Council established a new National Flag, whose field would be blue and white, with the Portuguese Coat of arms in the center. The blue and white had already been adopted as the national colours of Portugal in 1821, with the justification that those were the heraldic colours of the nation since Count Henry of Portugal. At that time they were however only applied to the national cockade and not to the flag, which remained white with the Portuguese coat of arms in the center. The first example of the new blue and white flag was embroidered by Mary II herself and raised for the first time at the Fortress of Angra. Initially, the new flag spread across the Azores islands, which were the only parts of the Portuguese territory then controlled by the Liberals. The new Portuguese flag was so born with a close connection to the Azores.

Eventually, the Liberal Wars ended in 1834 with a victory of the Liberals, who at that time already controlled most of Portugal. The blue and white flag was the national flag of Portugal during the period of Constitutional Monarchy. In the late 19th century, some political movements reclaiming increased Azorean autonomy adopted a flag with a goshawk and nine stars, with colours consistent with the Portuguese national flag of the time.

The national monarchy was overturned by the 5 October 1910 revolution and replaced by the First Portuguese Republic, with its red and green national flag. Following the Carnation Revolution, the 1976 Constitution of Portugal established the present Autonomous Region of the Azores. In 1979, the Regional Assembly of the Azores established the symbols of the region, including the Regional Flag. The new flag was inspired by the autonomist flags of the late 19th century.

== Symbolism ==
Blue and white were traditional colours used by the Portuguese nation and also represent the Portuguese Constitutional Monarchy borne in the Azores.

The nine stars symbolize the archipelago's nine islands.

The name of the archipelago comes from the Portuguese word açor, meaning goshawk, because it was supposed to be a common bird at the time of the discovery. However these birds never existed on the islands, they actually were a local subspecies of the buzzard (Buteo buteo), that was erroneously identified as goshawks by the first explorers.

The shield of Portugal present in the top left corner of the flag represents the Portuguese patriotism of the Azorean people.

== Protocol ==
In the Autonomous Region of the Azores, the Flag of the Azores takes precedence immediately after the Flag of Portugal. So, in the region, it takes precedence above all the remaining flags, including the European one which in mainland Portugal is usually given precedence immediately after the Portuguese flag.

The Azorean flag is to be raised in all public buildings and official ceremonies in the region, together with the Portuguese flag.

When two flagpoles exist, the Portuguese flag occupies the right one and the Azorean flag the left one. With three flagpoles, the Portuguese flag occupies the central one and the Azorean flag the one on the right. With more than three flagpoles, the Portuguese flag occupies the first on the right and the Azorean flag the following.

== See also ==
- Coat of arms of the Azores
- Hymn of the Azores
