= Coats of arms of Portuguese colonies =

Coat of arms of Portugal and its colonies at the headquarters of the Banco Nacional Ultramarino.

The coats of arms of the Portuguese Empire's colonies were all of a uniform style following 1935. (Note: published in the Diário do Govêrno) Two of them had, however, been using provisional coats of arms of the same style shortly prior to this.

== Gallery ==
This gallery include the lesser coats of arms. The years given are for the coats of arms.

Angola
(1935–1975)
Purpure, an elephant and a zebra both Or.

Cape Verde
(1935–1975)
Vert, on a sea wavy Argent and Vert a caravel proper.

Macau
(1935–1999)
Azure, a dragon Or armed and langued Gules holding between the paws an escutcheon charged with five plates in saltire.

Mozambique
(1935–1975)
Argent, a sheaf of arrows Vert tied together with a ribbon Gules.

Portuguese Guinea
(1935–1974)
Sable, a sceptre topped with a moor's head all Or.

Portuguese India
(1935–1961)
Or, a tower Gules ensigned by a St. Catherine's wheel Sable.

Portuguese Timor
(1935–1975)
Gyronny of 8, Sable and Argent, on a cross fleury countercharged an escutcheon Azure charged with five plates in saltire.

São Tomé and Príncipe
(1935–1975)
Gules, a waterwheel Or issuant therefrom drops of water Azure.

=== Full coats of arms ===
Angola
(1935–1951)

Angola
(1951–1975)

Cape Verde
(1935–1951)

Cape Verde
(1951–1975)

Macau
(1935–1951)

Macau
(1951–1976)

Macau
(1976–1999)

Mozambique
(1935–1951)

Mozambique
(1951–1975)

Portuguese Guinea
(1935–1951)

Portuguese Guinea
(1951–1974)

Portuguese India
(1935–1951)

Portuguese India
(1951–1961)

Portuguese Timor
(1935–1951)

Portuguese Timor
(1951–1975)

São Tomé and Príncipe
(1935–1951)

São Tomé and Príncipe
(1951–1975)

== See also ==
- Coat of arms of Portugal
- Portuguese heraldry
