= Coat of arms of Portugal =

Versions
- Version without laurels (for use on the national flag, naval Jack and some governmental flags)

- Version with the Camões verse "This is my blissful beloved Fatherland" on the scroll, for use on military colours and passports
- Armiger: Portuguese Republic
- Adopted: 30 June 1911
- Shield: Argent, five escutcheons in cross azure each charged with as many plates in saltire, all within a bordure gules charged with seven golden triple-towered castles
- Other elements: Behind the shield, an armillary sphere between two laurel branches embowed Or bound together in base by a ribbon vert and gules.

The coat of arms of Portugal also referred to, in Portugal, as the quinas is the main heraldic insignia of Portugal. It is used by the military and the government, including the courts.

There are three versions of the coat of arms. One is used on the national flag and the naval Jack, another is used on regimental colours of military units and on passports, and the third was intended to be used in seals, coins and other emblems. The shield, present on all three versions of the arms, is based on the royal arms used by the monarchy since the Middle Ages. The present model was de facto adopted on 1 December 1910, and de jure on 19 June 1911, specifications were published on 30 June 1911.

== Design ==
The present model of the coat of arms of Portugal was designed by the painter Columbano, a member of the commission appointed on 15 October 1910 to present the project for a new National Flag, following the establishing of the Portuguese republic on 5 October 1910. The models chosen by the commission were approved by the Provisional Government of the Republic on 29 November 1910, confirmed by the Constituent Assembly through the decree of 19 June 1911, with its details being specified in the Diário do Governo (official journal) no. 150 on 30 June 1911.

Three versions of the coat of arms were established, intended for different types of use. As its central element, all three include the shield of the traditional Portuguese arms placed over a golden armillary sphere.

The basic version consists of only the Portuguese shield over the armillary sphere. This version was intended for the National Flag and the naval jack. From 23 September 1911, this version was also used on the naval distinctive flags of the President of the Republic, ministers and other state authorities, the latter being also used on some governmental and state flags created afterwards. Occasionally, this version is unofficially referred to as the "lesser arms of Portugal".

The second version consists of the Portuguese shield over the armillary sphere, with this being surrounded by two branches of laurel, tied in the base with a white scroll with the Camões verse Esta é a ditosa Pátria minha amada ("This is my beloved merry homeland"). This version was intended to be used on the regimental colours of the military units.

Finally, the third version is similar to the second one but the scroll does not include the verse and is usually represented in red and green. This version was intended to be used in seals, coins and other emblems.

=== Charges ===
==== Quinas ====
Quinas in the Portuguese coats of arms.

Quina (plural quinas) is the Portuguese word for quincunx, meaning either five-twelfths or, more usually, a pattern of five parts.

After the official recognition of the Kingdom of Portugal as a kingdom in 1143 (it had been self-declared as so in 1139), silver bezants were added to the blue cross of the shield, symbolising coins and the right of the monarch to issue currency, as leader of a sovereign state. Eventually, and given the enormous dynamism of medieval heraldry, it is believed that the shield degraded and lost some elements in battle, eventually losing the cross format. This is how King Sancho I inherited the shield from his father, Afonso Henriques, with the cross replaced by escutcheons with the silver bezants. A traditional legend explains that these escutcheons represent the five moor kings defeated by King Afonso I of Portugal in the Battle of Ourique.

The number of silver bezants in each escutcheon varied extensively, with versions representing four up to eleven. In the late 14th century, however, the number of bezants was fixed in five. Late explanations interpret them as the five wounds of Jesus Christ and/or the thirty pieces of silver (with the five bezants in the middle escutcheon counted twice).

From the fixation of the number of bezants in five, the groups of the five escutcheons, each with five bezants of the Portuguese shield became popularly referred as quinas. By synecdoche, the term "Quinas" came to be used as an alternative designation of the coat of arms of Portugal and came even be used as a reference to anything that represents Portugal (e.g. the Flag of Portugal often referred as the "Flag of the Quinas").

==== Castles ====
A castle with the same design as the ones displayed in the coat of arms

The red bordure featuring golden castles (not towers, as some sources state) was added during the reign of Afonso III. Although the number of castles could vary between eight and fourteen, Sebastian I fixed them at seven definitively. They supposedly represent the Moorish castles conquered by Portugal during the Reconquista. Their origin is probably Castilian Afonso III was the second son of King Afonso II of Portugal and thus was not expected to inherit the throne, which first went to his elder brother King Sancho II of Portugal. Afonso III combined both the arms of his father and the arms of his mother Urraca of Castile, thus the Castilian red border with golden castles, around the Portuguese arms inherited from his father.

=== External devices: Supporters ===
==== Armillary sphere ====
The armillary sphere displayed in the coat of arms, note a red line indicating the cropped segment.

An important element of Portuguese heraldry since the 15th century, the armillary sphere was many times used in Portuguese naval and colonial flags, mainly in Brazil. It was a navigation instrument used to calculate distances and represents the importance of Portugal during the Age of Discovery, as well as the vastness of its colonial empire when the First Republic was implemented.

The use of the armillary predates the current flag by centuries. It was the personal emblem of King Manuel I. It was first added to the flag in 1815 as part of the flag of the United Kingdom of Portugal, Brazil and the Algarves.

The 1910 commission appointed by the government to study the symbols of the new republic suggested the armillary sphere as "the eternal standard of our adventurous spirit".

==== Laurel branches ====
The current design, adopted in 1910, of the coat of arms of Portugal incorporates a pair of laurel branches forming a wreath. It is the only element of the coat of arms with a non-native meaning as they were intended to represent the roman crown of laurel with the commission responsible for the new flag briefly referring to them as a "triumphal symbol". In some older renditions, the supporters are distinct.

== History ==
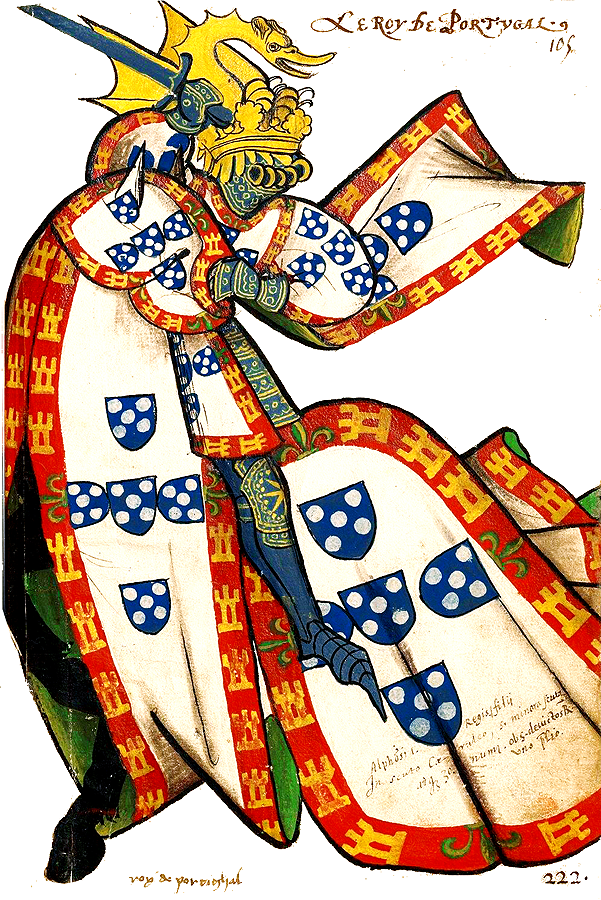
Equestrian arms of the King of Portugal, in the 15th-century armorial of the Order of the Golden Fleece.

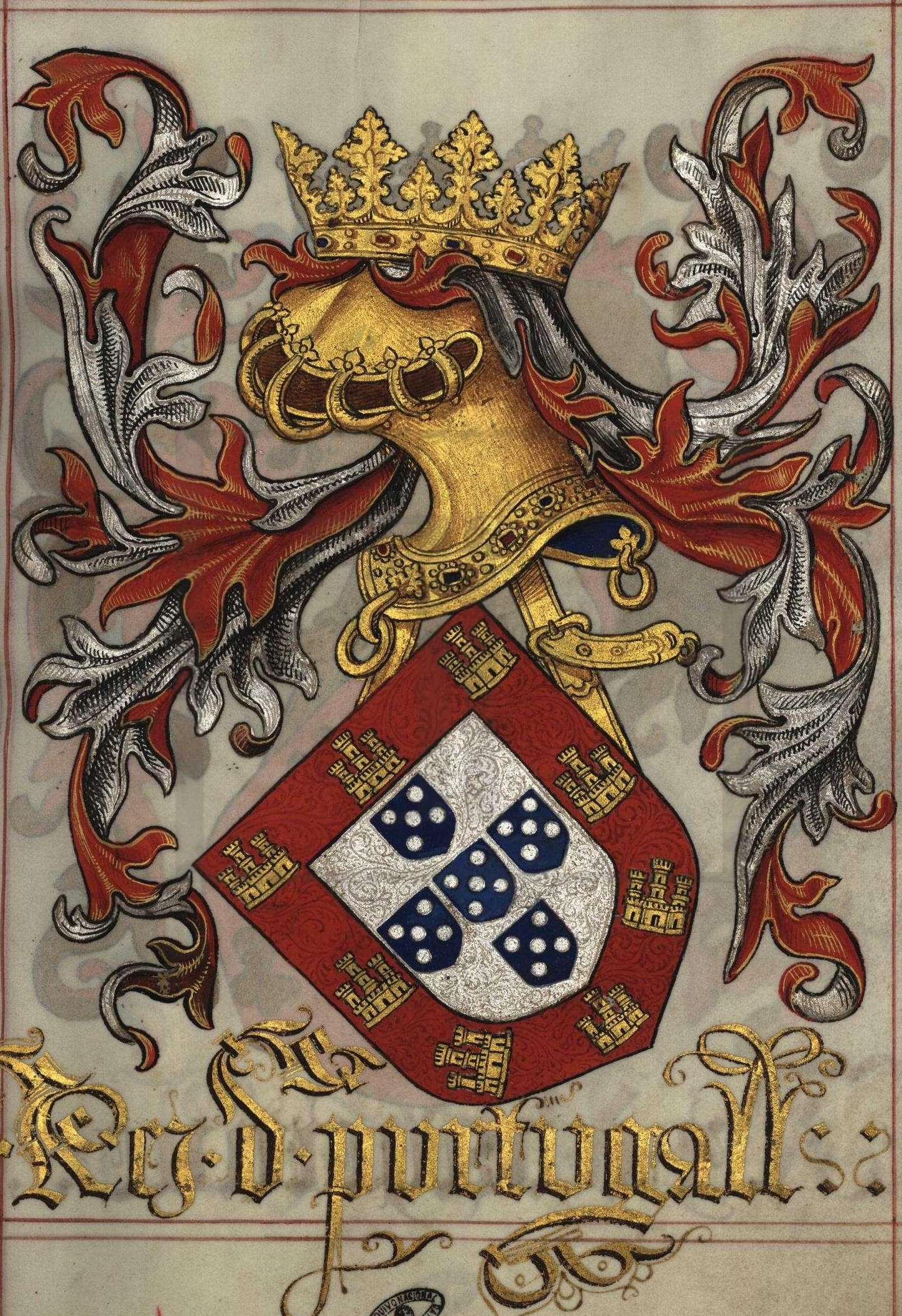
Arms of the King of Portugal in the Livro do Armeiro-Mor, armorial of the early 16th century

The national heraldry of Portugal evolved from the royal heraldry, with the royal coat of arms gradually coming to be considered a national coat of arms.

The Portuguese coat of arms itself is the result of almost a millennium of modifications and alterations. Starting with the cross azur on field argent, which constituted the putative shield of Henry, Count of Portugal in the 12th century, successive elements were added or taken, culminating with the complex heraldic design that was officially adopted in 1911 (after the Republican Revolution of 1910).

=== Evolution ===
The main and constant element of the coat of arms of Portugal is and has always been the Portuguese shield. This resulted from around 300 years of evolution, from the 12th to the 15th centuries.

The heraldic shield used by Afonso Henriques, who became the first King of Portugal, is believed to have been Argent, a cross azure (a blue cross on a white field), apparently the same as that used by his father, Count Henry.

The original shield evolved to Argent, five escutcheons crosswise the dexter and sinister ones pointing to the center azure each semée of plates (a field argent with five escutcheons azure forming a cross, the dexter and sinister ones pointing to the center, with each escutcheon semée of plates). This is the earliest verifiable form of the Portuguese shield. Apparently it was introduced during the reign of Afonso Henriques (Afonso I) and definitely was used during the reign of his successor King Sancho I (1185–1211), during the period in which heraldry came into widespread use throughout western Europe.

==== Inescutcheons ====
There are several legends which seek to explain the significance of the five escutcheons and of the plates. The escutcheons are said to represent either the Five Holy Wounds of Christ on the Cross, the five wounds suffered by Afonso Henriques in the Battle of Ourique or the five Moorish kings defeated by him in that battle. The plates are supposed to represent either the pieces of silver received by Judas Iscariot to betray Jesus or the sovereignty of the Portuguese Kings, symbolized by the right to issue their own money. A more mundane theory suggests that the heraldry represents merely the physical fabric of the battle-shield of Afonso Henriques, which may have comprised two blue leather bands nailed to a white base; after having been repeatedly hit in battle, most of the bands had become cut off, except for the five pieces on top of the clusters of nails. These remaining five pieces of blue leather with the bright heads of the nails showing through, are thus proposed as the origin of the five escutcheons azur, each semée of plates.

==== Bordure ====
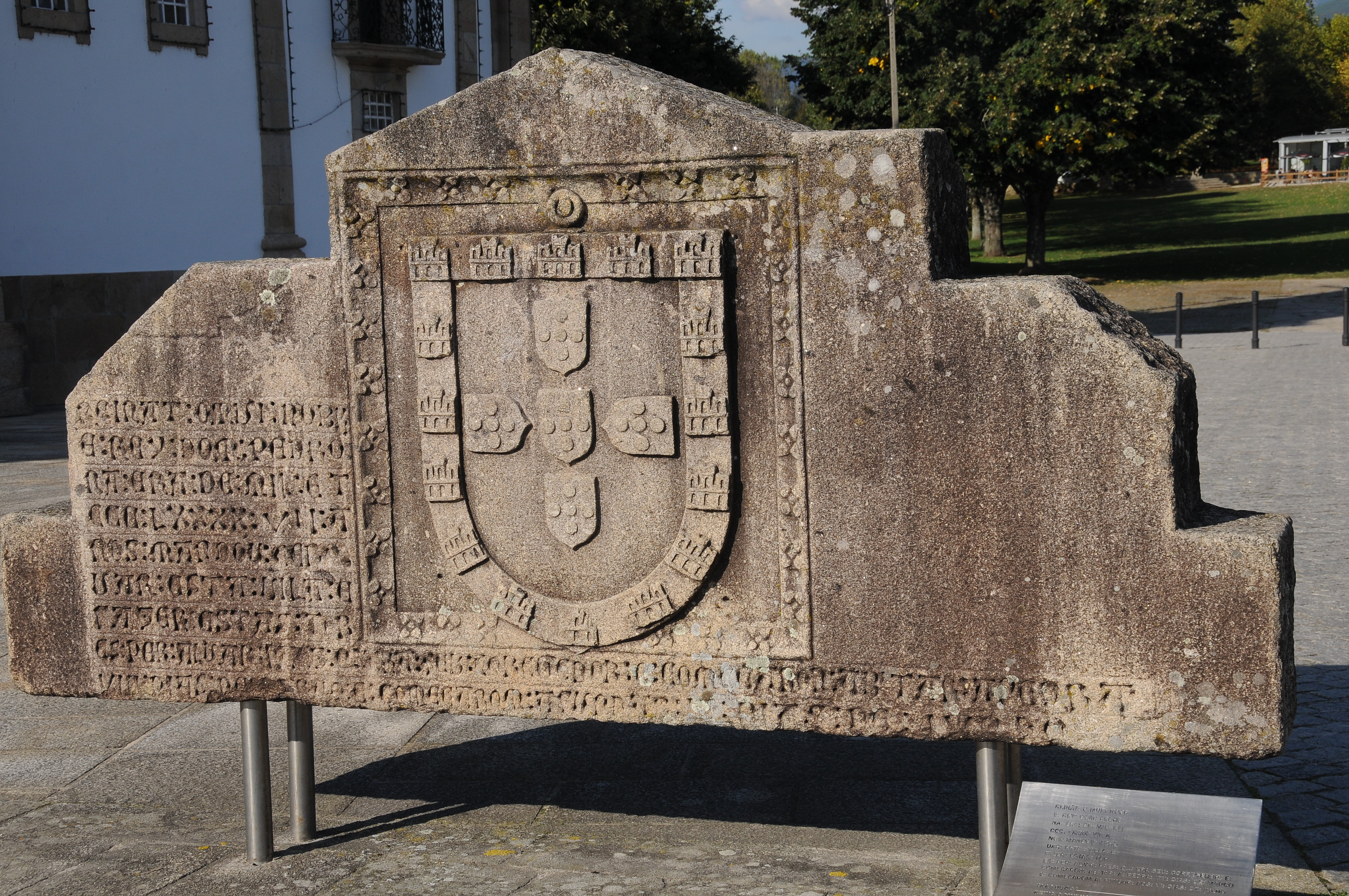
Portuguese shield in an early 14th-century commemorative stone at Ponte de Lima

When the future Afonso III of Portugal asserted his claim to the throne occupied by his brother Sancho II, he adopted as his coat of arms the Portuguese shield differenced by the addition of a bordure gules semée of castles or. When Afonso III eventually became King in 1247, he retained use of this differenced shield, instead of reverting to the original shield without the bordure. There are several theories which seek to explain the significance of the castles within the bordure, the most popular one being that they represent the last castles conquered in the Algarve from the Moors by that king, completing the Portuguese Reconquista. However, the most common presently accepted theory is that the bordure was merely a mark of cadency to signify that Afonso was not the head of the Royal family, the castles probably having been suggested as suitable elements from the arms of his mother Urraca of Castile. Later the number of castles within the bordure became fixed at seven, this being the version of the shield still in use today.

==== Cross of Aviz ====
During the 1383–1385 Portuguese interregnum, one of the emerging candidates to the throne was John, master of the Order of Aviz, an illegitimate son of King Peter I of Portugal. John was elected Regent and Defender of Kingdom in 1383 and acclaimed King of Portugal in 1385, as John I and during his reign the royal Portuguese shield was added to by the inclusion of the insignia of the Order of Aviz, namely a cross flory vert (a green cross with a fleur-de-lys at the end of each arm). This was effected in various ways: by insertion within the bordure, alternating with the castles; more commonly inserted within the shield, and occasionally shown outside the shield with the latter laying over it.

==== Escutcheons ====
Finally, in 1485, King John II ordered the correction of the Portuguese shield, eliminating features identified as heraldic errors. Thus the cross of the Order of Aviz was removed and the dexter and sinister escutcheons were set upright, lest left couchée they might be assumed to symbolize bastardy, which was not appropriate in the case of that monarch. Furthermore, the semée of plates on the field of each of the five escutcheons was fixed in number at five as a reference to the Five Holy Wounds of Christ, being the personal devotion of that monarch, and were arranged in saltire thus forming a quincunx. Thus, the arrangement of five escutcheons, each with five plates started to be known as quinas, signifying "groups of five", and by synecdoche, the Portuguese shield itself started to be referred as the quinas.

Evolution of the escutcheon
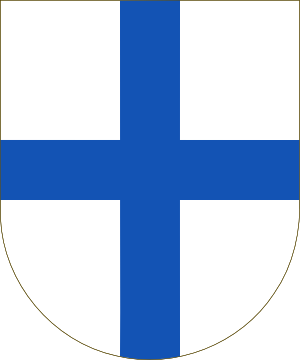
1095? – 1139?

1139? – 1247

1248–1385

1385–1481

1481–1911

1911-present

During some periods of effective or claimed Royal union of Portugal with other states, the Portuguese shield was used marshaled with the coats of arms of those states. Beatrice of Portugal, who claimed the Portuguese crown during the 1383-1385 interregnum, used the Portuguese arms in the II and III positions of the shield, marshaled with the arms of her husband King John I of Castile in the I and IV. King Afonso V of Portugal, who claimed the crown of Castile during the 1475–1479 period, used the Portuguese arms in the I and IV, marshaled with the arms of Castile and León in the II and III. During the period of the Iberian Union (1580–1640), the Portuguese shield was placed in the honour point of the complex coat of arms of the House of Habsburg. These marshaled coats of arms had, however, a very limited use, with the simple Portuguese coat of arms being used in the national context and the marshaled arms being only used when they intended to represent personally the monarch.

When the status of Brazil was raised from that of state to a constituent kingdom of the Portuguese Monarchy, giving origin to the United Kingdom of Portugal, Brazil and the Algarves, the Royal coat of arms was altered by the addition of an armillary sphere or over a field azur, these being the Brazilian arms. The new Royal achievement of arms consisted therefore of the Portuguese shield (representing Portugal and the Algarves) over the armillary sphere (representing Brazil), all topped by the Royal crown. Although displayed as a supporter of the Portuguese shield and not as part of it, it is controversial if the armillary sphere should be considered or not part of the main field of the new achievement. This achievement of arms was used in Portugal from 1815 to 1826 (despite Brazil having achieved independence in 1822, only when King John VI died in 1826 did Portugal revert to the use of the old coat of arms).

Following the overthrown of the monarchy in 1910, the new government decided to replace the national flag, and since the shield was kept in the new flag, the color tonalities of its components, something that was not established until then, where chosen in order to accommodate with the colors of the new national flag, the design of the castles was also standardized, another aspect of the shield that was not established previously, namely their visual representation, and that the doors, in the national flag, were to be represented as closed (displayed as yellow), while in the national colors were to be represented as open (displayed as blue). Until 1911 even though the design of the castles in the shield, and its overall visual aspects, differed from manufacturer to manufacturer, they were all represented with their doors being open.

=== External devices ===
Until the early 14th century, the achievement of arms of Portugal consisted solely in the shield, with no external elements surrounding it being represented.

A crown over the shield started to appear in some representations of the Portuguese coat of arms in the 14th century. Initially, a crude open crown was represented, this evolving to a crown similar to the present coronet of duke, so consisting of a circlet surmounted by leaves. The crown come to appear more and more in the representations of the coat of arms of Portugal, becoming virtually inseparable from the Portuguese shield. In most of the cases the crown was represented laying directly over the shield, although in the rare occasions in which the helmet was represented, the crown was placed over it. From the 16th century until the establishment of the republican coat of arms in 1910, the Royal crown was virtually present in all representations of the coat of arms of Portugal, being also the only constant external element of the shield. In the reign of King Sebastian (1557–1578), the open Royal crown was replaced by a crown closed with a single arch. This latter evolved to a crown with two arches. The final model of heraldic crown was adopted in the reign of Peter II (1683–1706), this being a crown closed with four arches, surmounted by a globe topped with a cross. At the same time, the previous crown with two arches became the crown of the Prince apparent heir of the Portuguese crown.

Evolution of the heraldic royal crown of Portugal
15th and early 16th centuries

Late 16th century

17th century

From the late 17th century

Other external elements surrounding the shield, started to be also represented in the Portuguese coat of arms from the 14th century, although none of them has reached the status of a constant element, as the Royal crown.

One of the most important of these elements was the heraldic crest, which at least from the reign of John I became a dragon, probably associated to the adoption of Saint George as the patron saint of Portugal. Until the 17th century, the dragon was represented in or, but since then, it started to be represented in vert. This change of color was probably due to the ascension to the throne, in 1640, of the House of Braganza, which had the green as its livery color, this also becoming the national color of Portugal. During the period of the House of Braganza, two dragons vert became frequently used as the supporters of the Portuguese Royal shield.

Other of the external elements was the helmet or with bars, that was frequently represented between the 14th and the 16th centuries, but rarely appearing in the achievement afterwards. Both the torse and the mantling that appeared in the helmet were represented in argent and gules during the reign of King Manuel I (1495–1521), these being his livery colors. In latter representations of the Royal achievement of arms, the torse and the mantling included the four colors of the Portuguese shield argent, gules, or and azur.

Supporters also were frequently represented in many artistic representations of the Portuguese coat of arms. The most frequently represented supporters until the 18th century were the angels. Usually two angels were represented, one in dexter and the other in sinister, but in some representations the shield is supported by a single angel. Occasionally, the supporter angel was represented using a tabard or surcoat with the Portuguese arms, what may indicate that he was not a generic angel but specifically the Guardian Angel of Portugal. From the reign of King Manuel I forward, it was common to represent the angels handling armillary spheres and crosses of the Order of Christ or handling flags with those badges. From the 18th century onwards, the dragons vert that served as the Portuguese crest became also the most often represented supporters in the achievement of arms of Portugal. In latter representations of the Portuguese coat of arms, the dragons dexter and sinister carry each one a flag with elements of the Portuguese shield, the dexter being argent with the five escutcheons and the sinister being gules with seven castles or.

In the reign of King Manuel I, his personal heraldic badge (the armillary sphere) and his insignia as master of the Order of Christ (the cross of this order) started be intensively represented, usually as elements surrounding the Portuguese shield. These two heraldic insignia were so intensively used that they evolved from being mere personal insignias of Manuel I to be considered national insignias, continuing to be used even after the end of the reign of this king. Occasionally, the armillary sphere was represented as the supporter of the Portuguese shield, in a similar composition to those that, centuries later, would be used in the arms of the United Kingdom of Portugal, Brazil and the Algarves and of the Portuguese Republic.

During the reign of Henry, a peculiar Royal achievement of arms was used, which included a red ecclesiastical hat (galero) and respective tassels, combined with the Royal crown, to reflect the cardinal standing of the King.

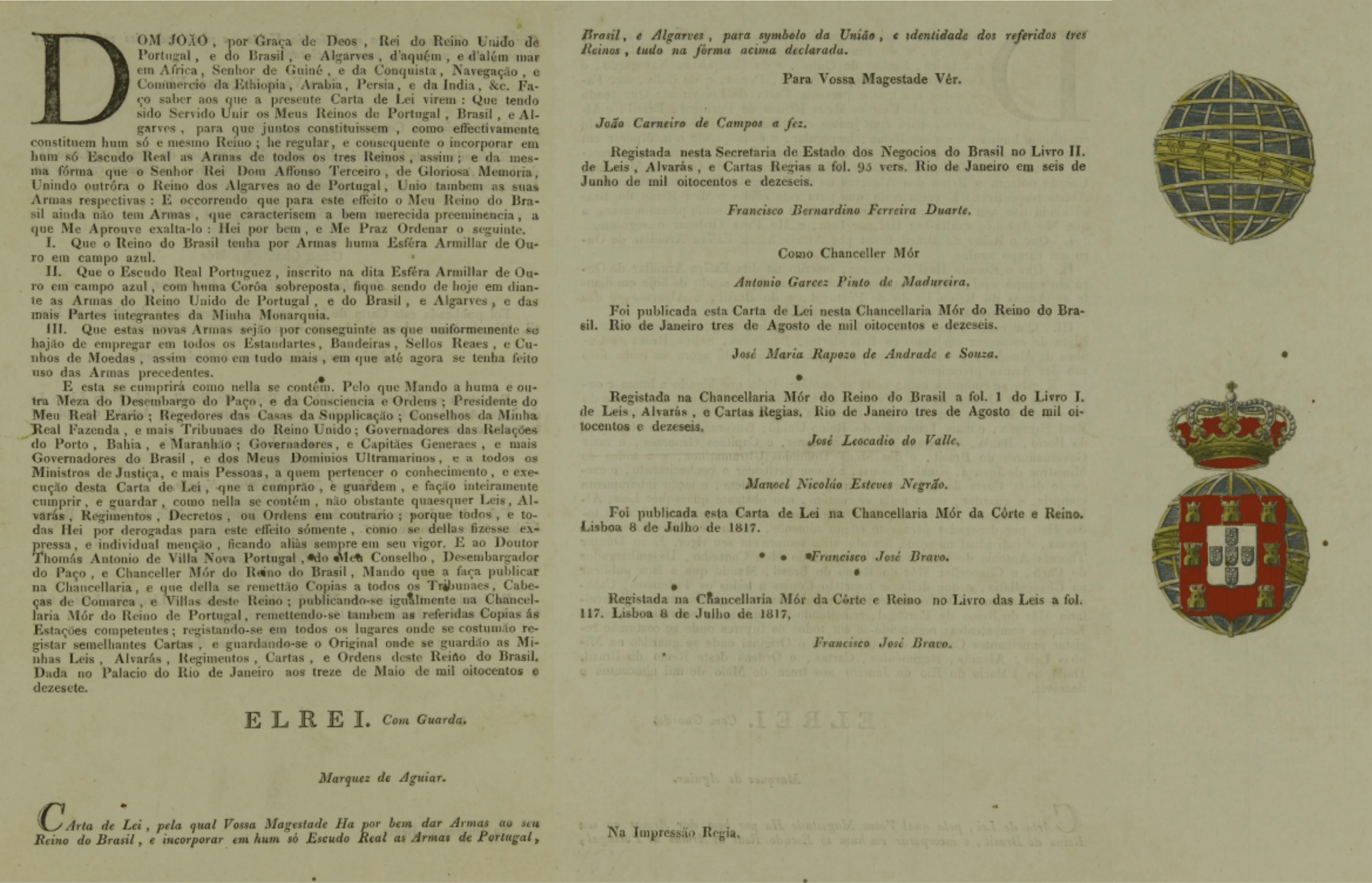
Royal charter which established the royal arms of the United Kingdom of Portugal, Brazil and the Algarves

During the 1815-1825 period, the Royal coat arms were changed to reflect the establishment of the United Kingdom of Portugal, Brazil and the Algarves, starting to include also the armillary sphere or over a field azur, which was adopted as the coat of arms of the newly created Kingdom of Brazil. The new achievement consisted so of the Portuguese shield (representing Portugal and the Algarve) over the armillary sphere (representing Brazil), all topped by the Royal crown. The armillary sphere appeared so as a kind of supporter of the shield, although it is controversial if it should be really considered a supporter or part of the main element of the arms.

From the second half of the 19th century, the Royal coat of arms became commonly represented with the shield covered by a pavilion purple lined ermine issuing from the Royal crown.

Historical supporters and other external elements adorning the Portuguese coat of arms
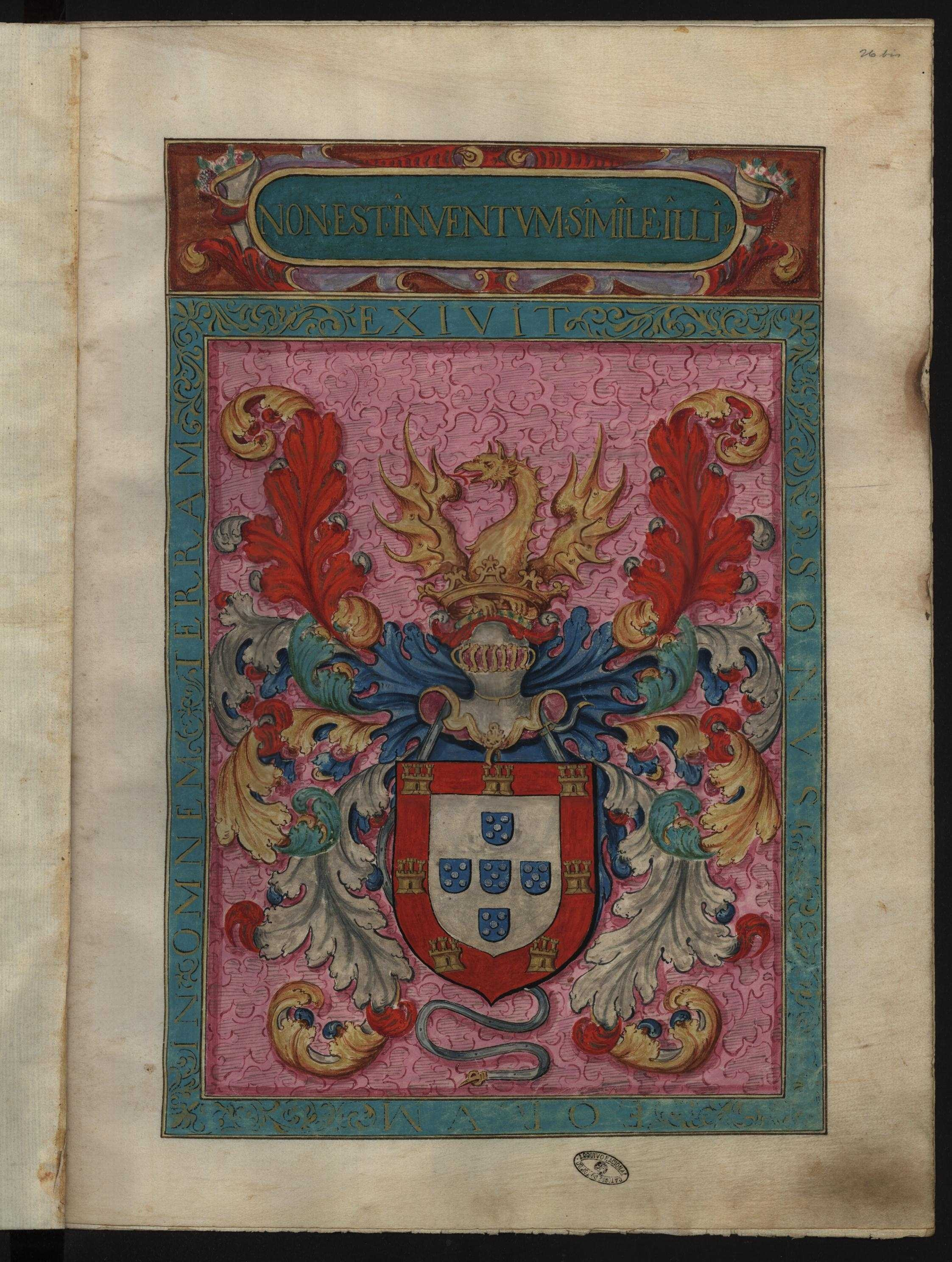
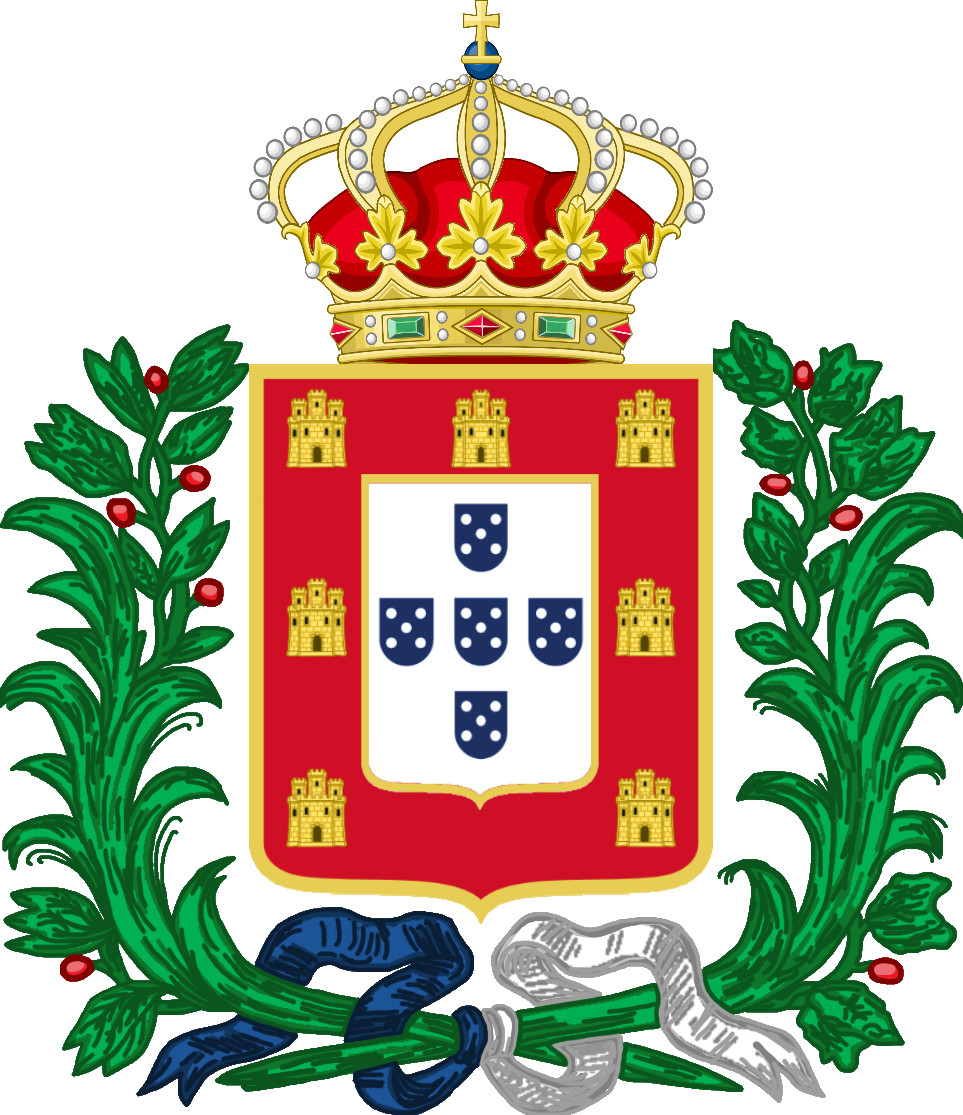
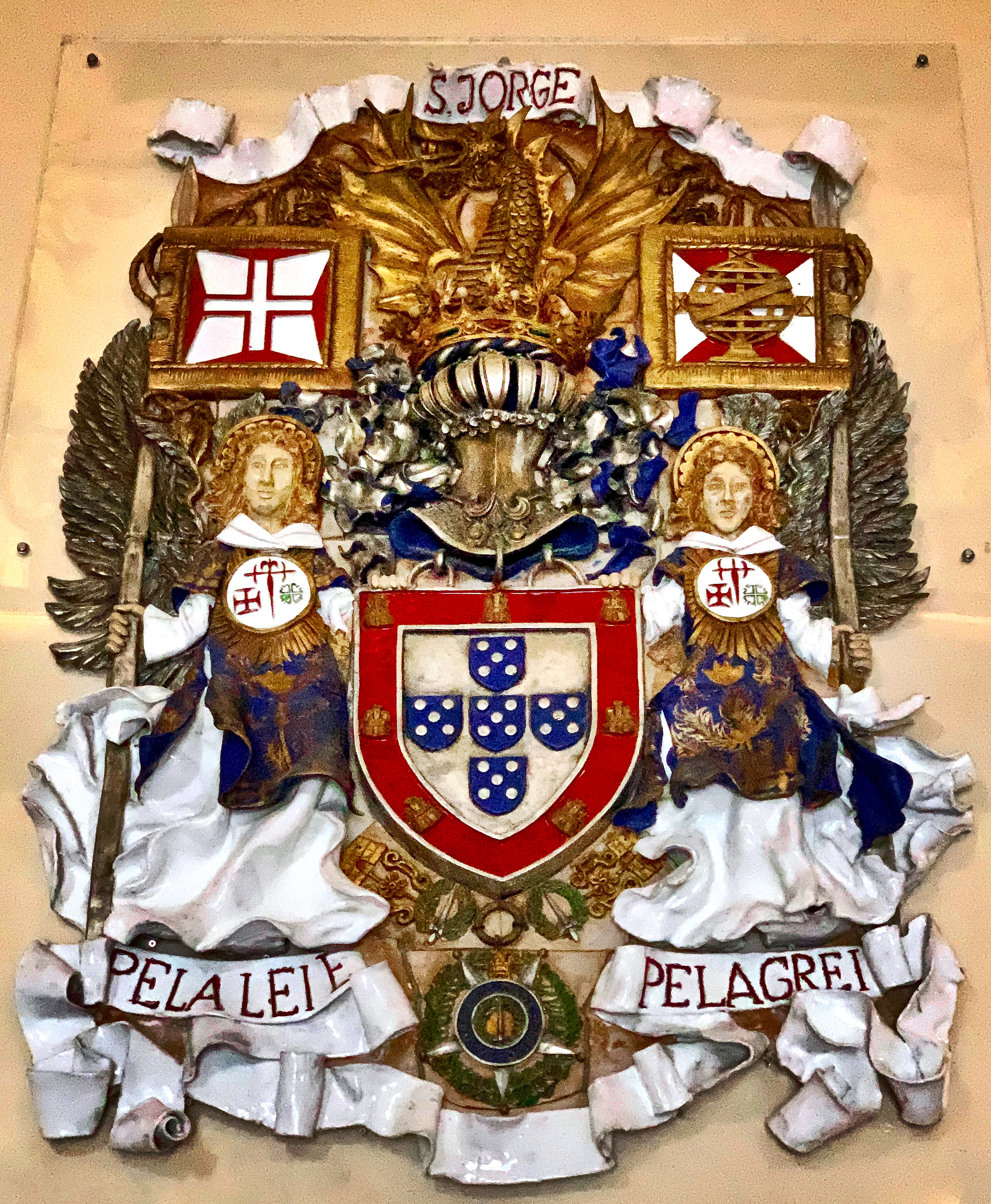
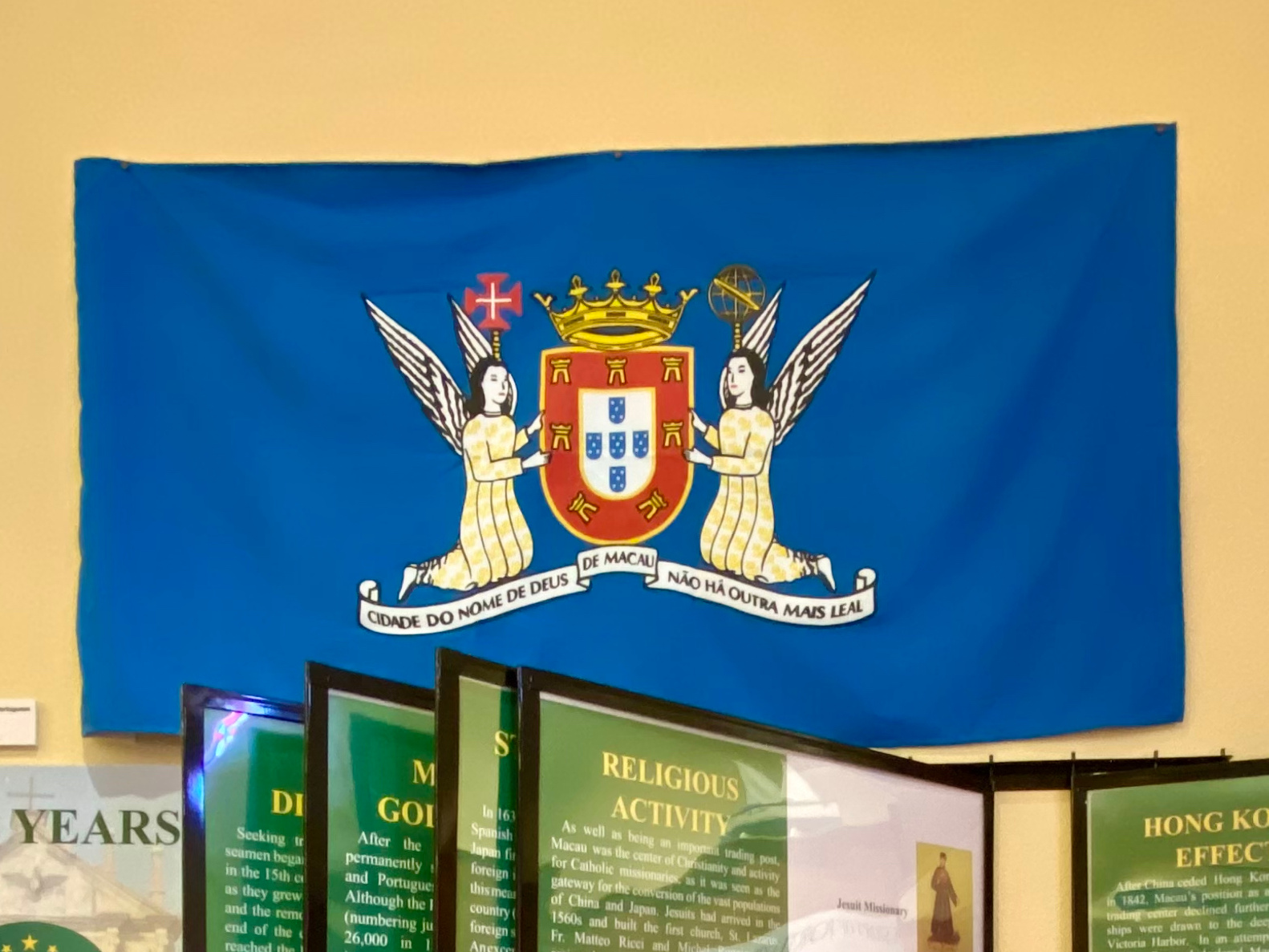
Dragon or crest, helmet or and mantling gules, or, azur and argent in a Thesouro da Nobreza armorial representation of the Portuguese achievement of arms
Angels as supporters of the 15th century shield (House of Aviz)
Cardinal hat on the top of the Portuguese arms used in the reign of King Henry
Green wyverns as supporters of an 18th-century model shield (House of Braganza)
The armillary sphere as supporter of the Portuguese shield in the Coat of arms of the United Kingdom of Portugal, Brazil and the Algarves
Achievement with green wyverns, banners and crest
Pavilion in a 19th-century model coat of arms
Royal Coat of arms surrounded by a laurel wreath, commonly used in coins and official documents
Cross of the Order of Christ as the supporter of the Portuguese arms in the badge of the Order of the Colonial Empire
Supporters wearing a tabard bearing the insignia of the Sash of the Three Orders and holding a banner of the cross of the Order of Christ and the standard of King Manuel I in a 20th-century model coat of arms (Estado Novo)
Supporters surmounted by Cross of the Order of Christ (sinister) and armillary sphere (dexter) in a 20th-century model coat of arms (Municipality of Macau)

== Notable depictions ==
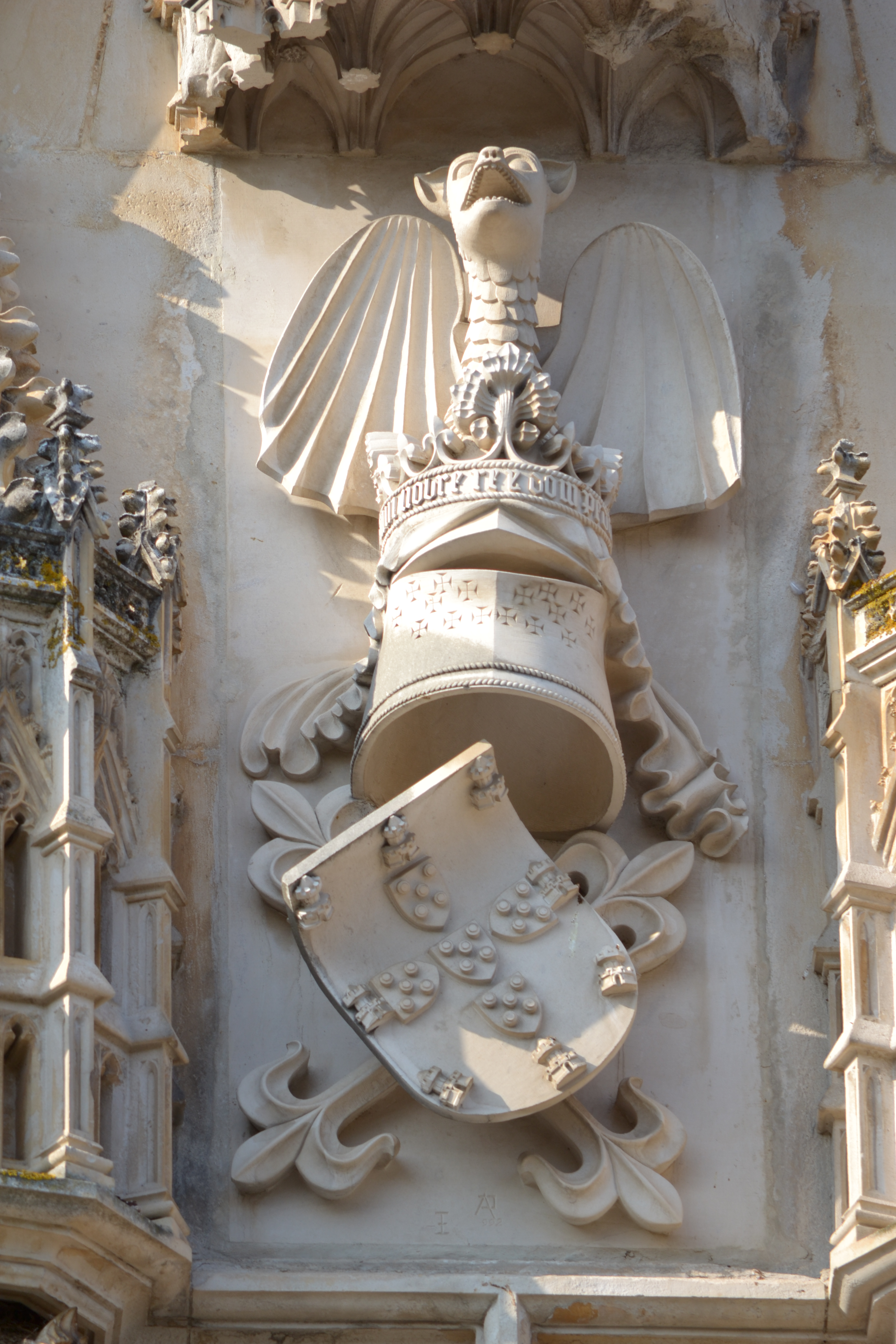
Portuguese coat of arms, with the Cross of the Order of Aviz as supporter and the dragon as crest, in a late 14th-century gate of the Batalha Monastery

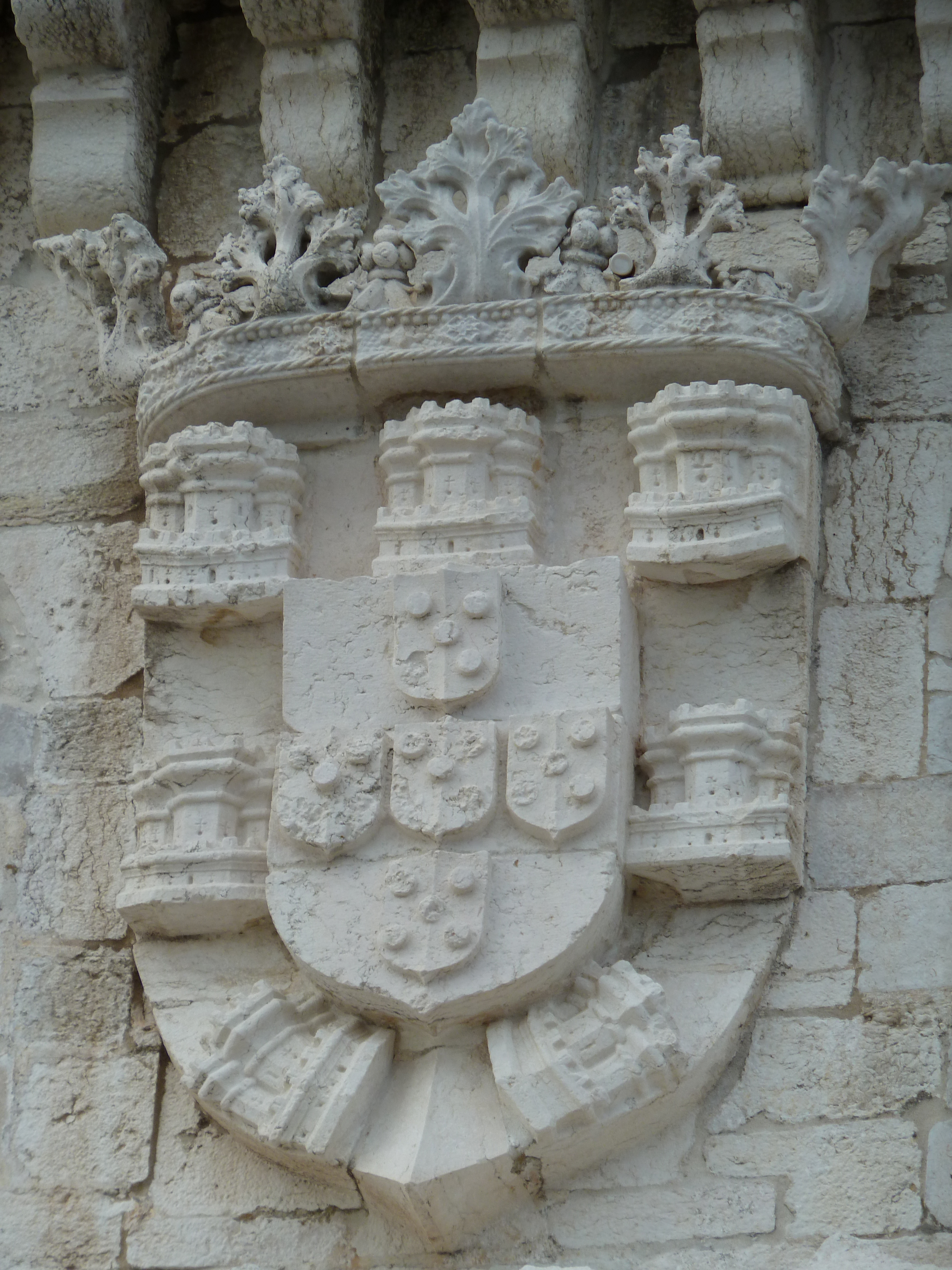
Manueline style coat of arms in the Belém Tower, Lisbon

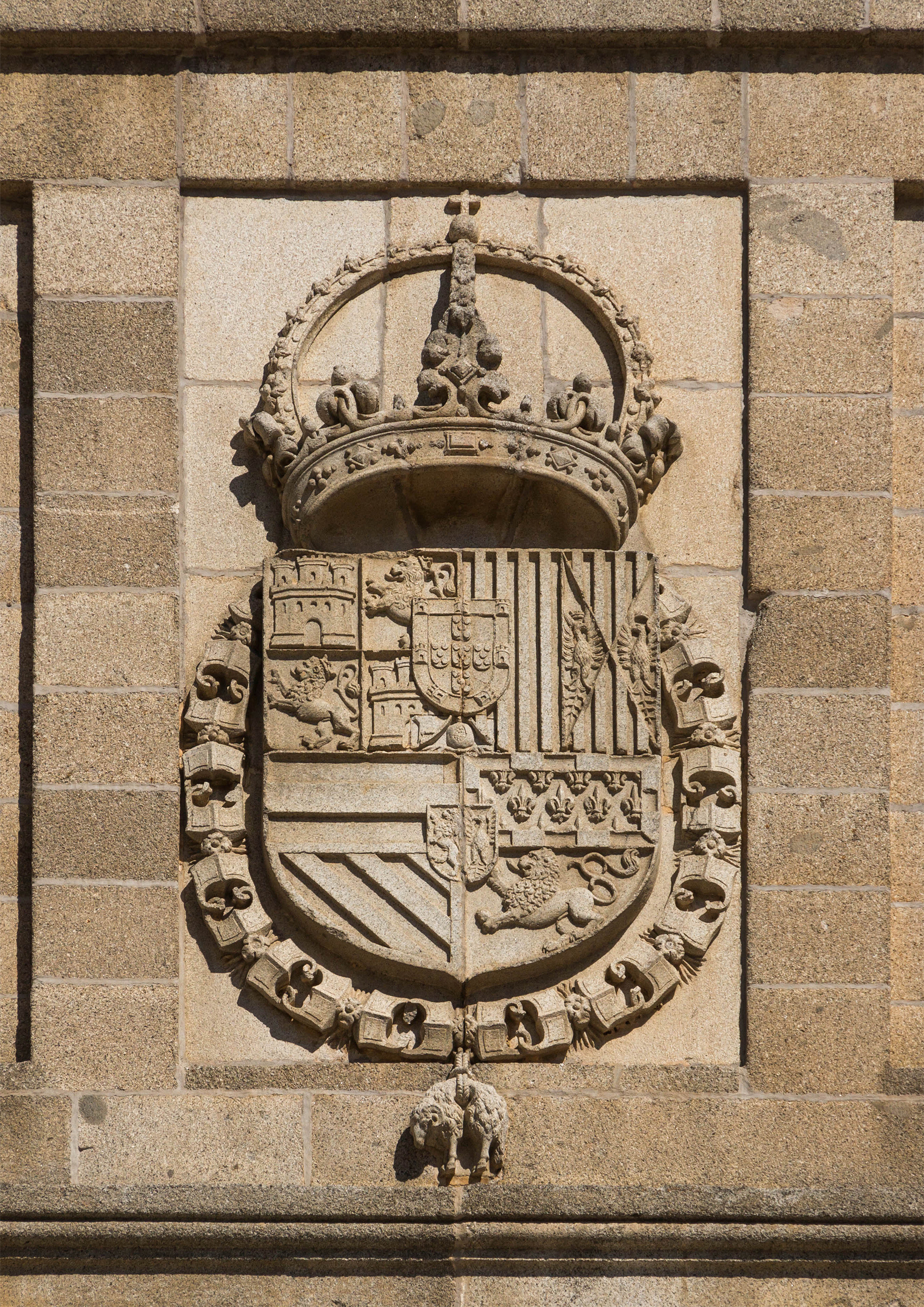
Relief achievement of arms of the House of Habsburg at the El Escorial, Spain, with the Portuguese shield in the honour point

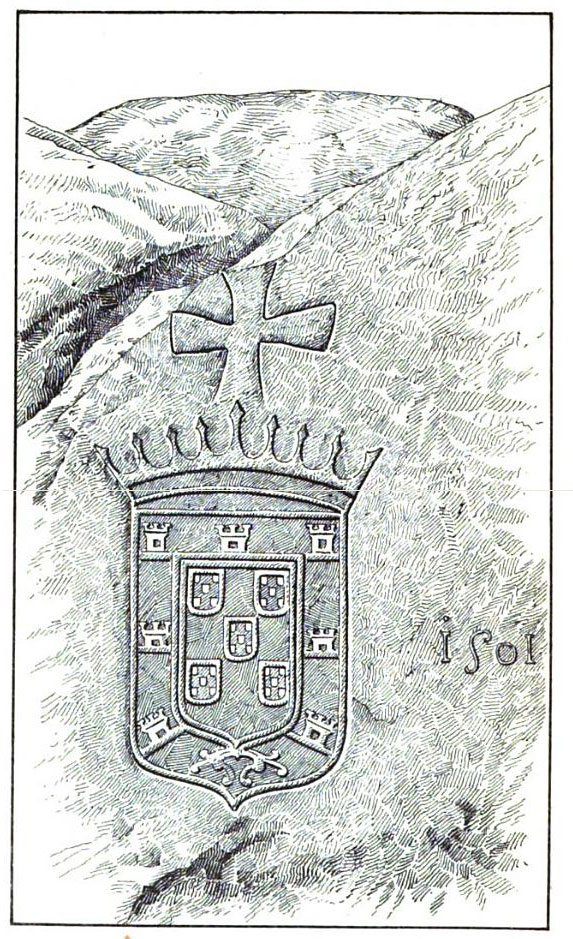
Lithograph of the Portuguese coat of arms carved on a boulder in Sri Lanka.

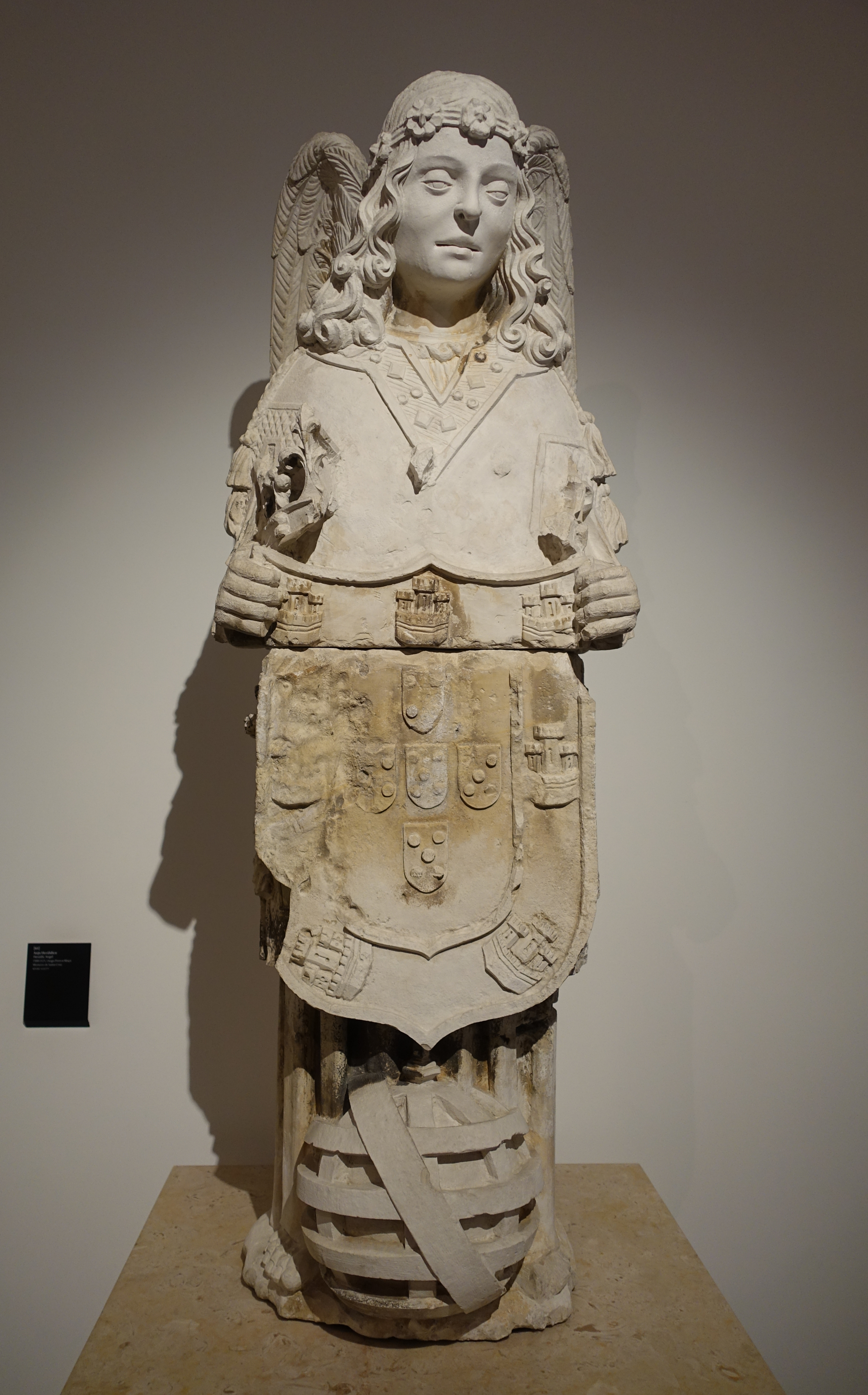
Coat of arms supported by Angel of Portugal in the Machado de Castro Museum, Coimbra

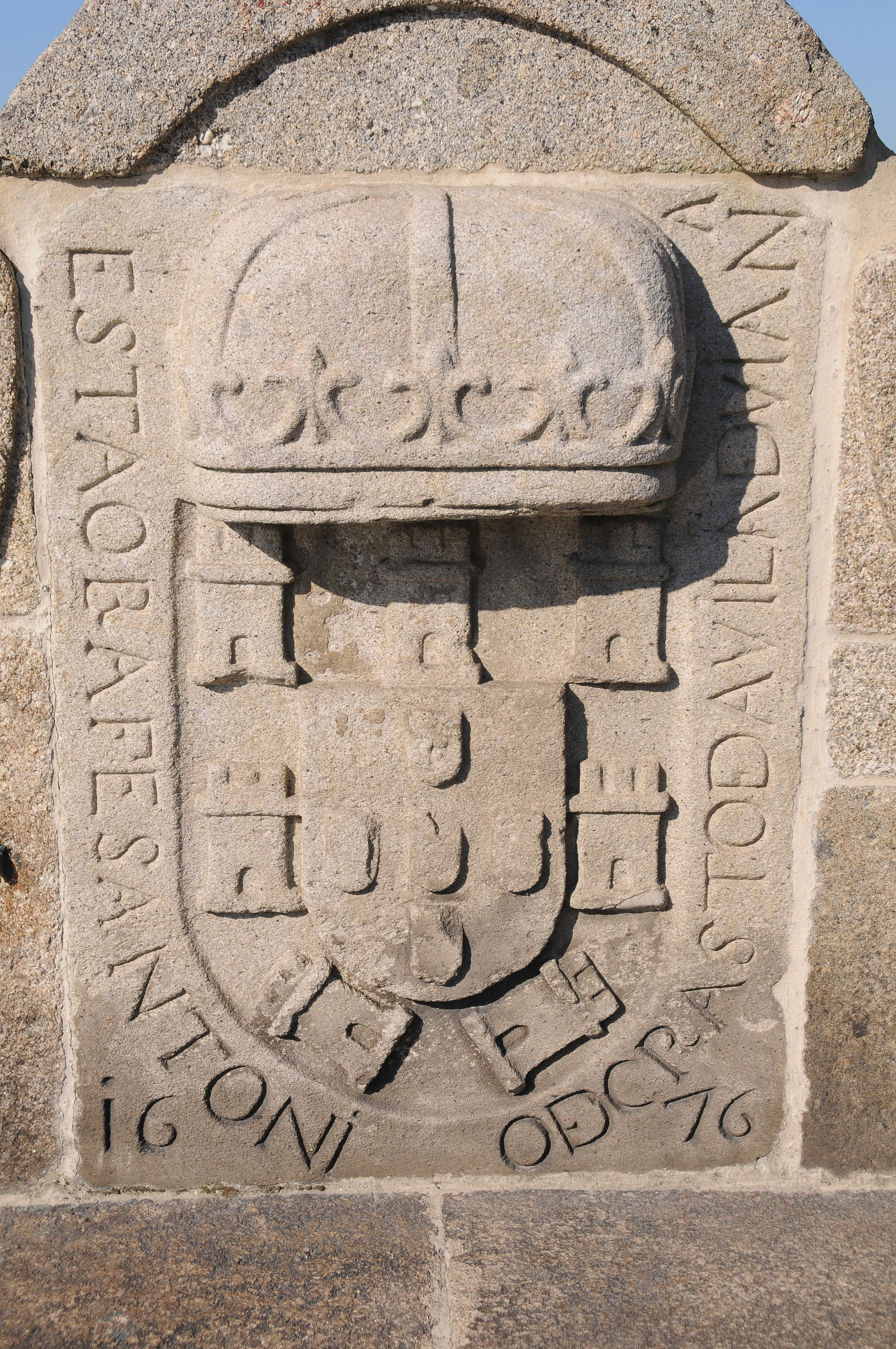
17th century coat of arms on the Prado bridge at Vila Verde

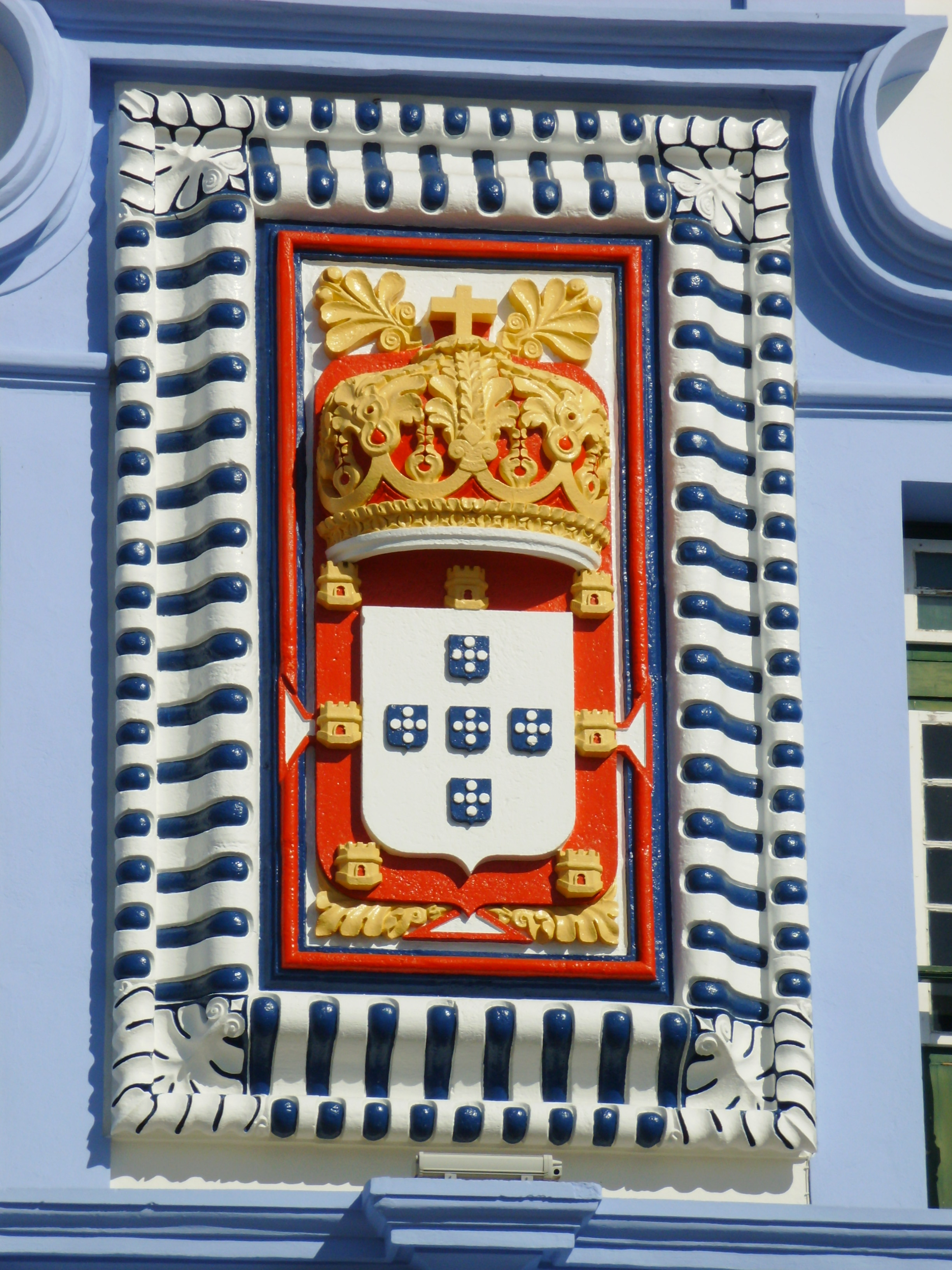
18th century coat of arms in the façade of the Misericórdia Church of Angra do Heroísmo

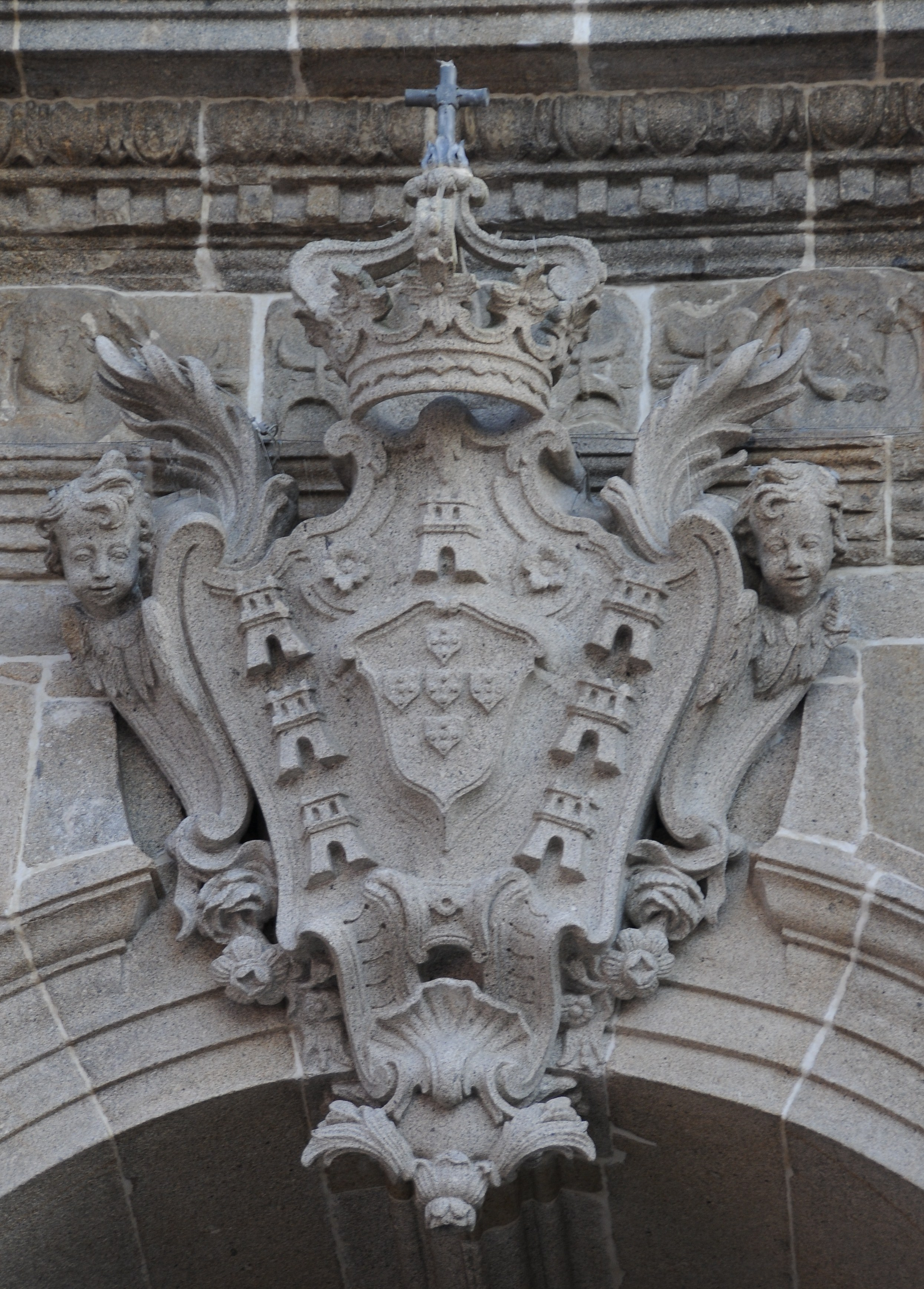
Baroque coat of arms on the portal of the Misericórdia Church of Braga

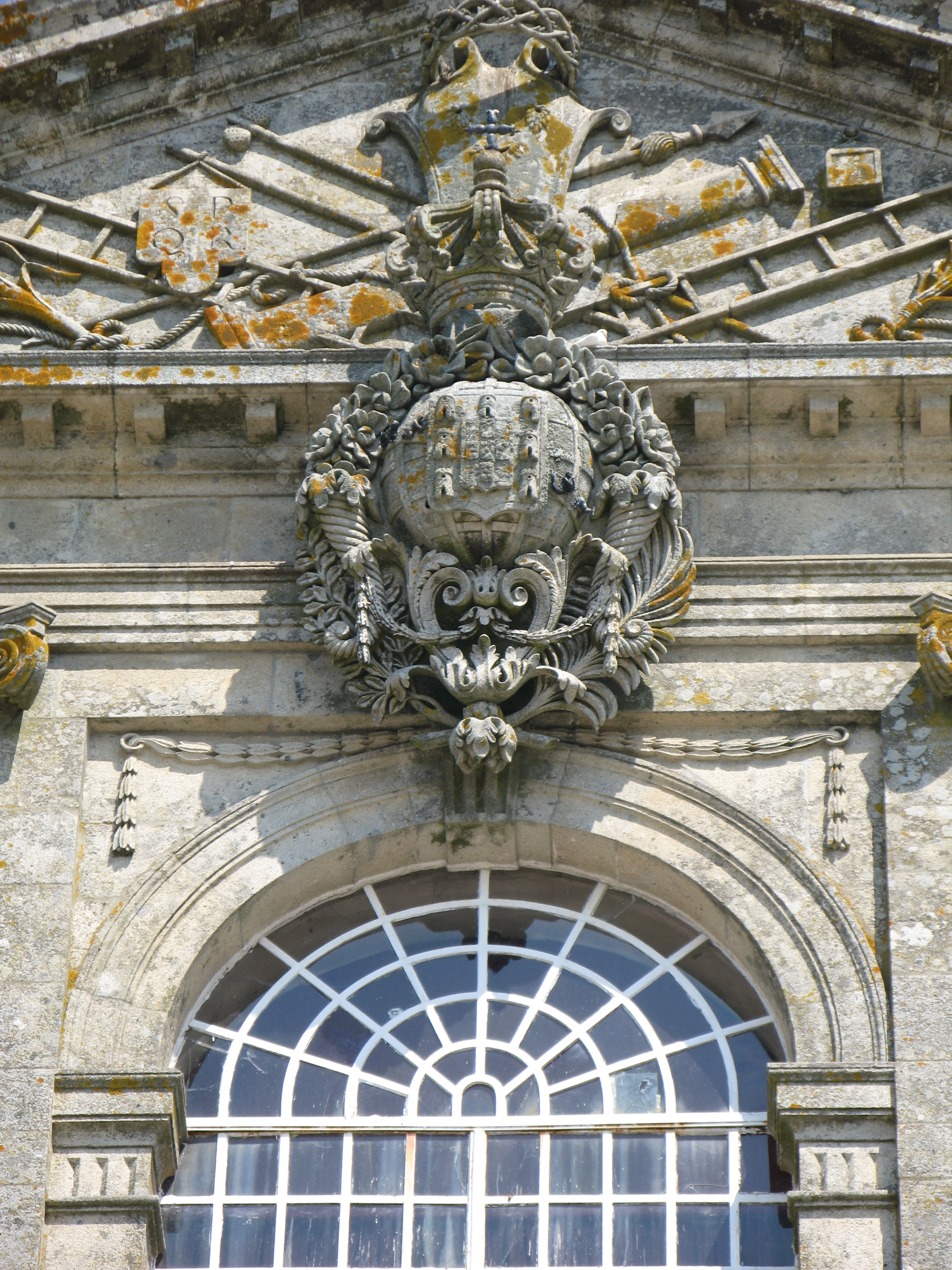
Stone relief the coat of arms of the United Kingdom of Portugal, Brazil and the Algarves in the Basilica of Bom Jesus in Braga

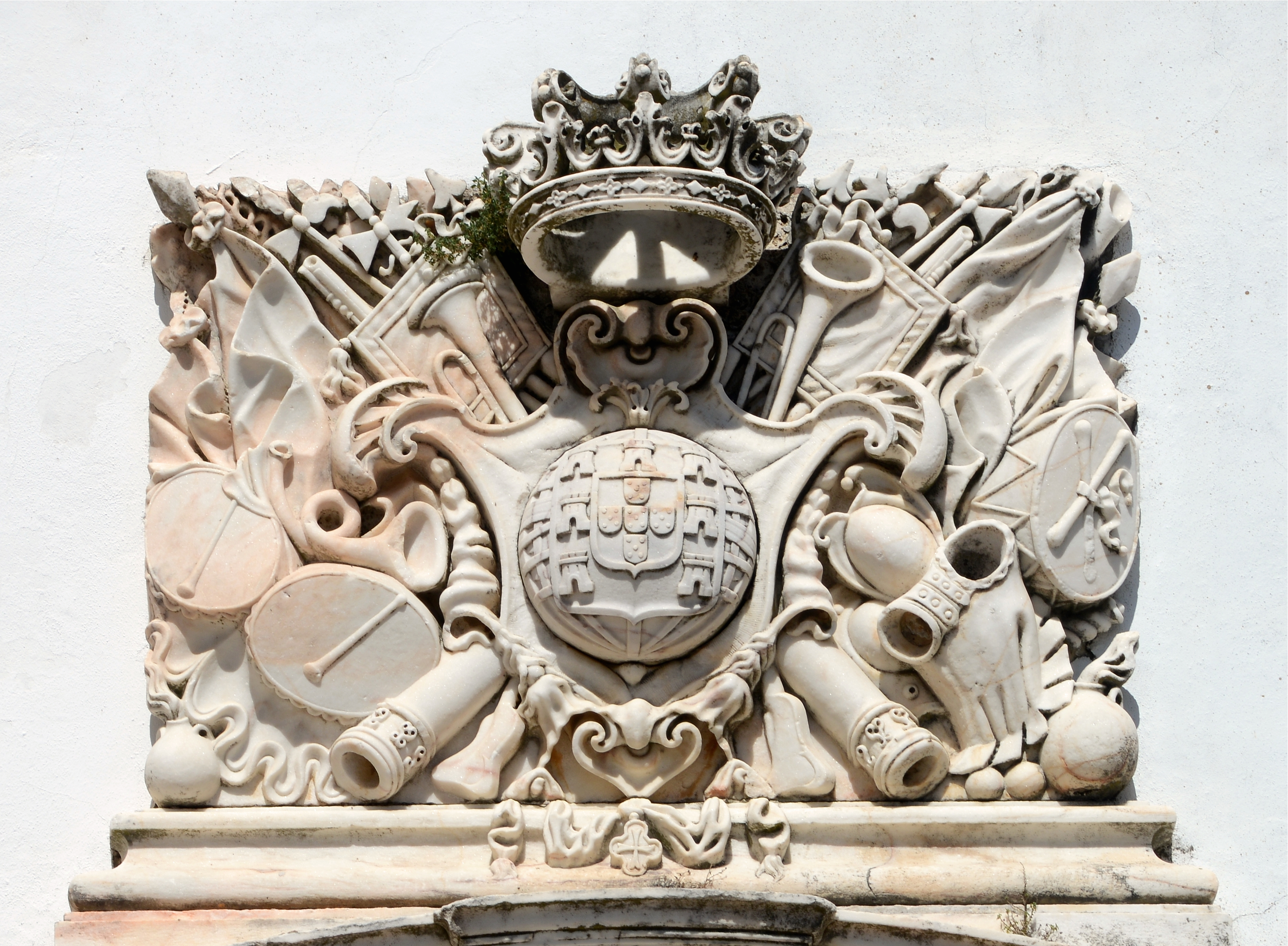
Trophy with the coat of arms of the United Kingdom of Portugal, Brazil and the Algarves in the façade of the Castle of Estremoz

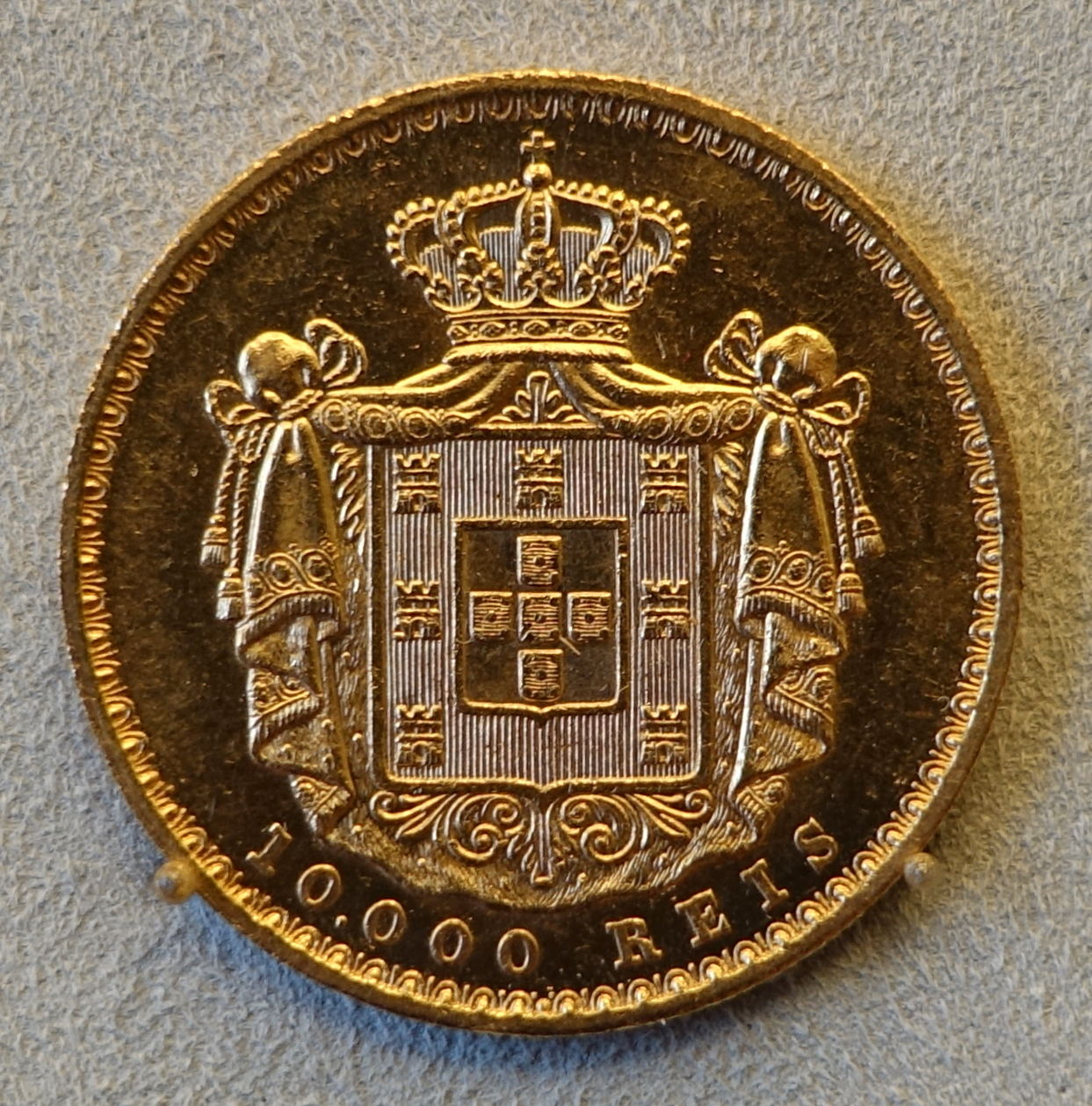
Coat of arms in the 10 000 réis coin of 1884

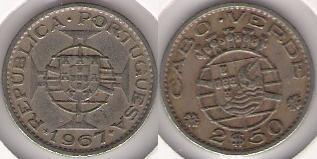
(On the left) Portuguese coat of arms over the cross of the Order of Christ in the Cape Verde 2.5 escudos coin of 1967

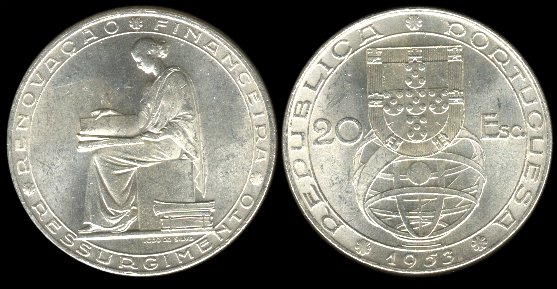
1953 20 escudos coin.

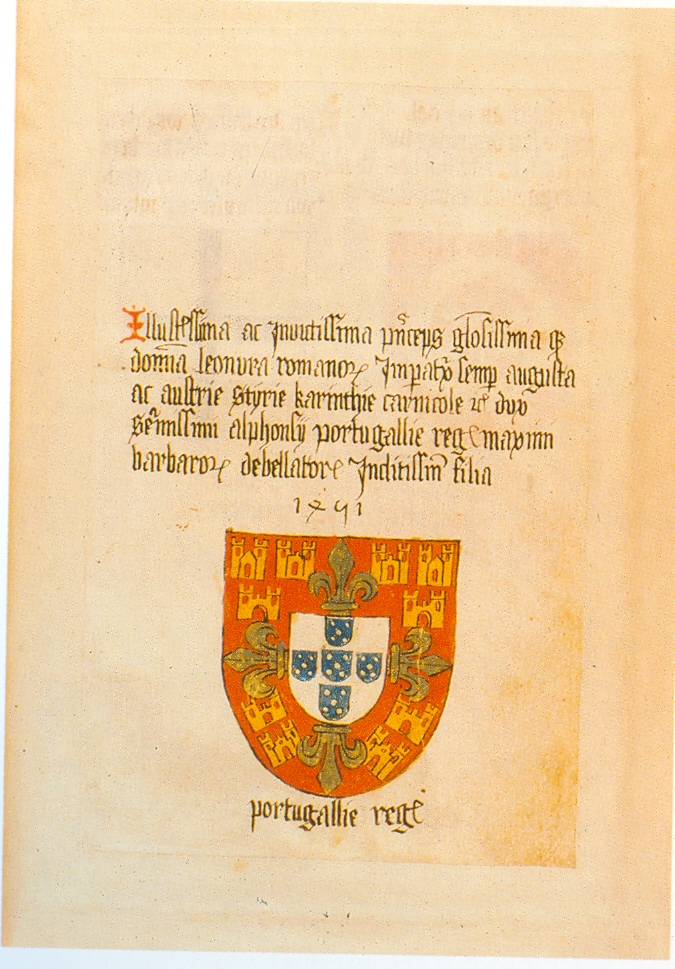
Portuguese shield in the Codex Gottha, 1459

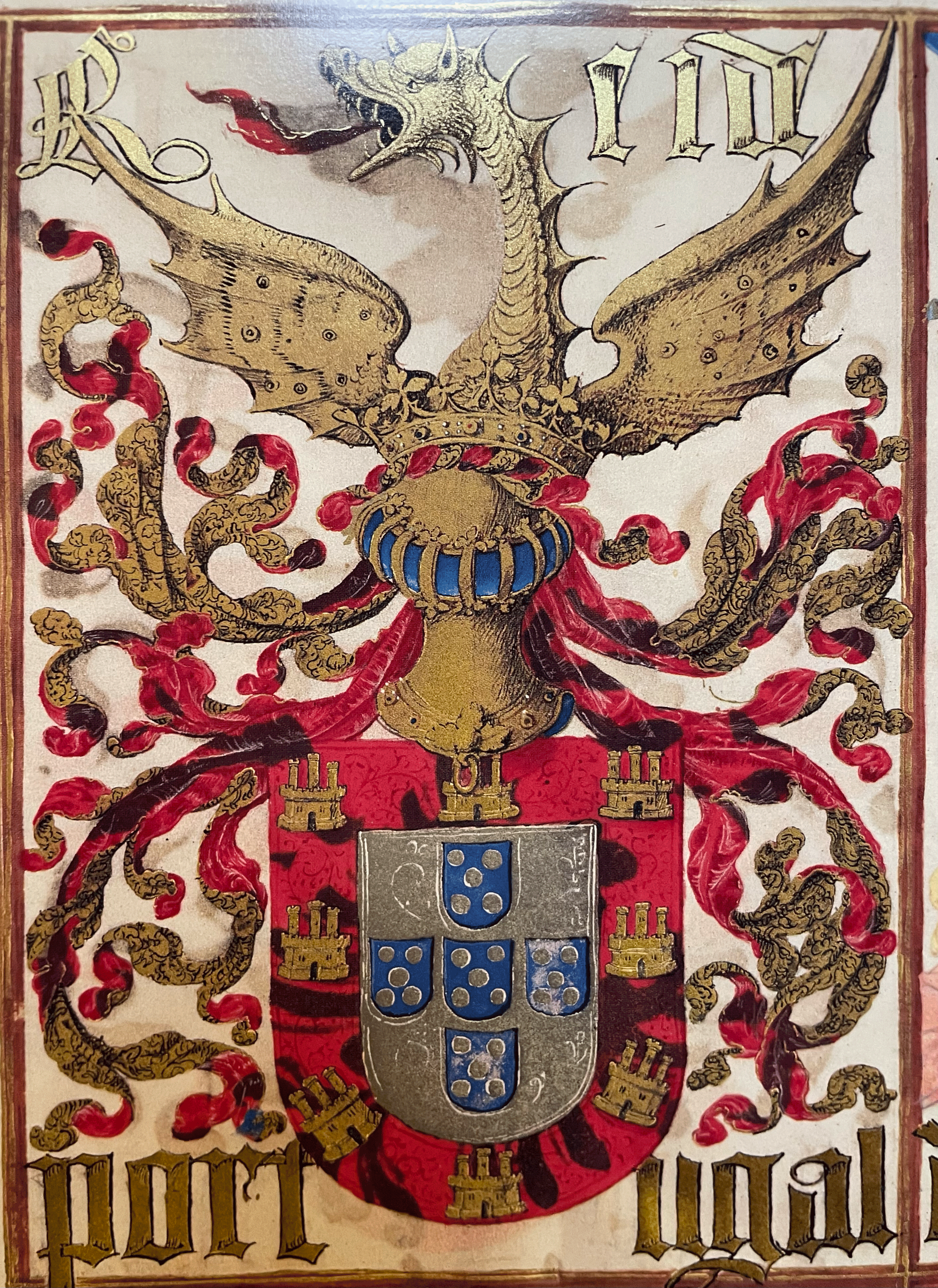
Represented in the Livro da Nobreza e Perfeição das Armas by António Godinho

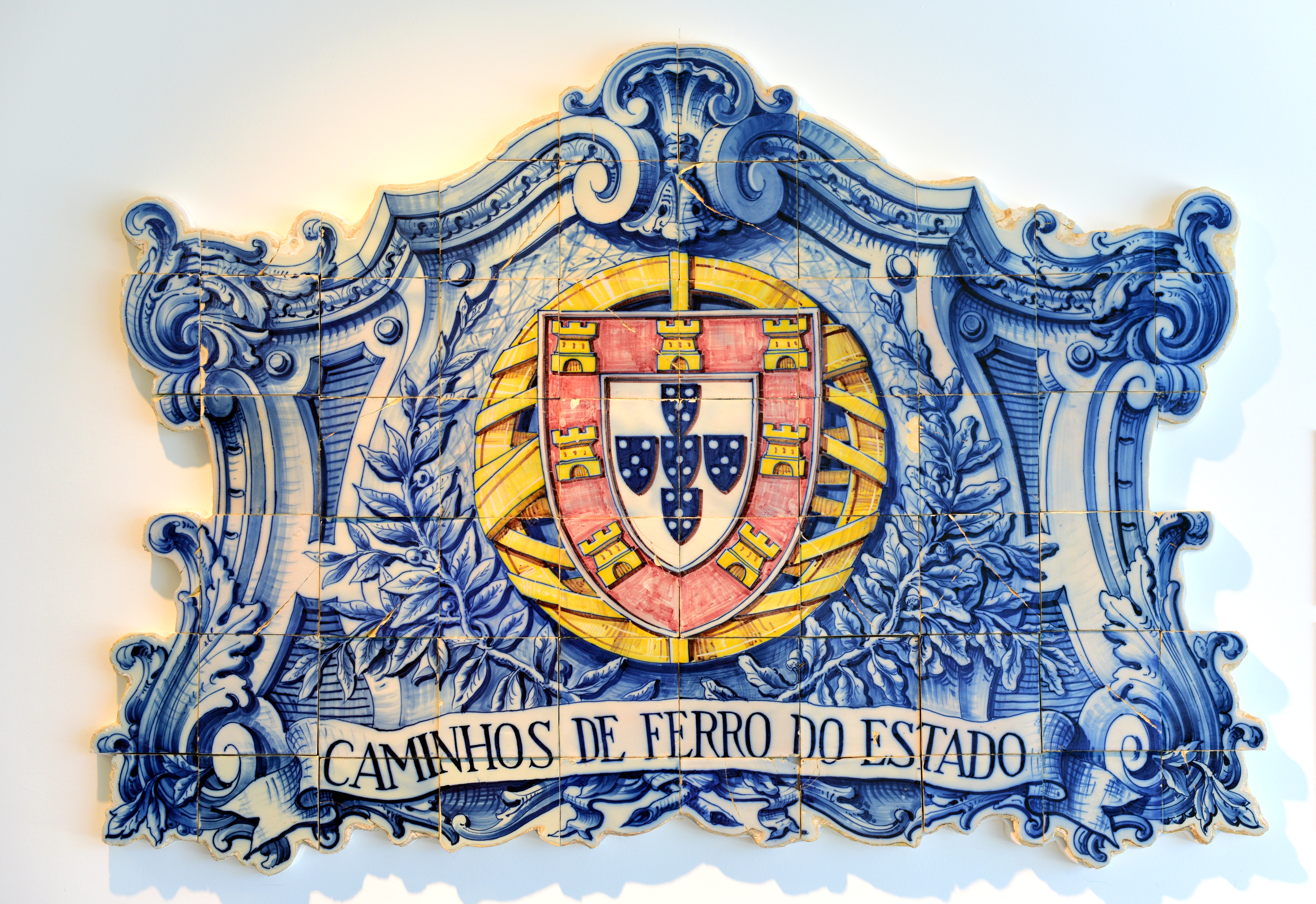
20th century coat of arms painted on an azulejo panel at a train station

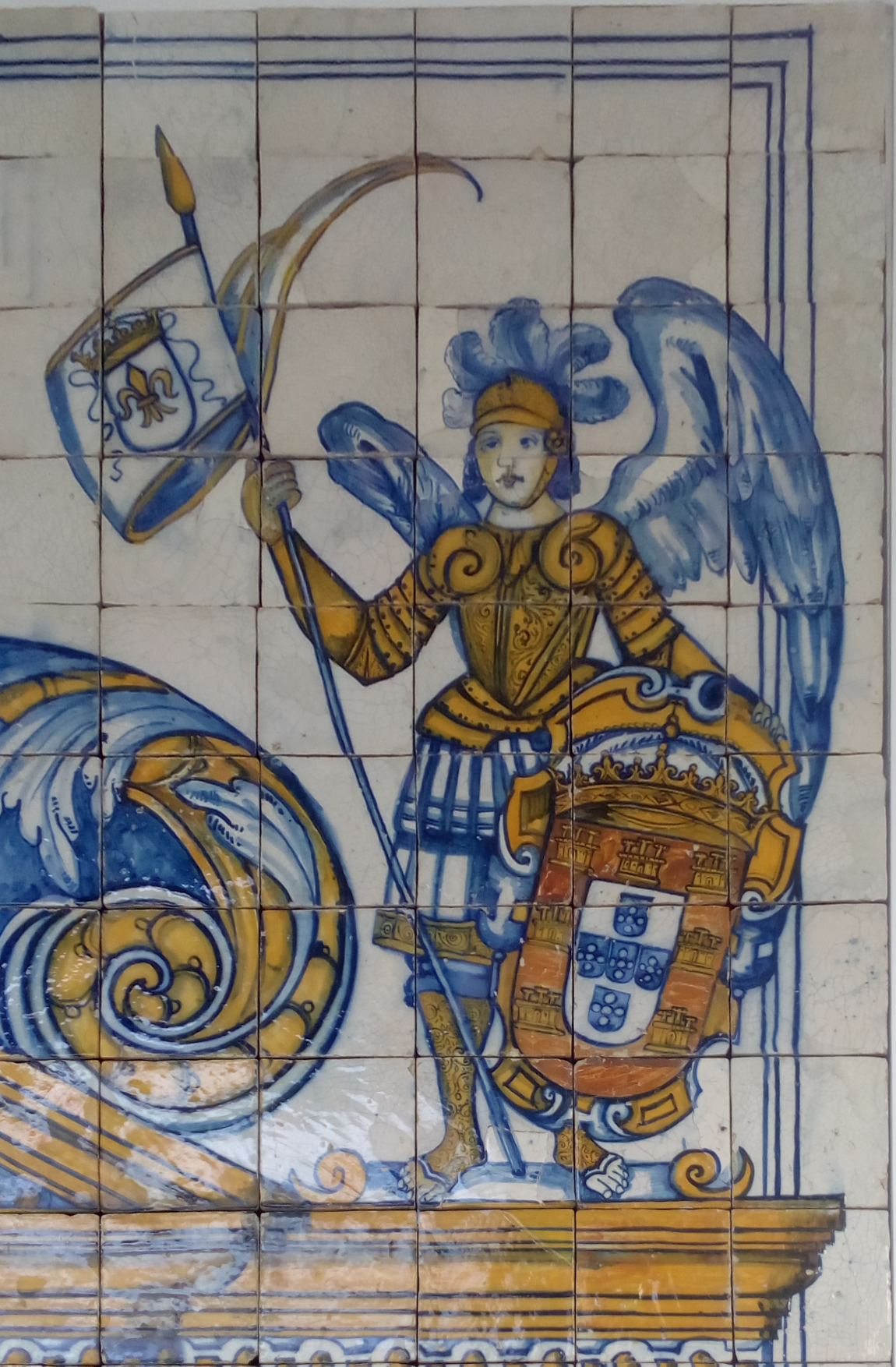
"Lieutenant Archangel holding the arms of Portugal" in a tile panel in the National Azulejo Museum

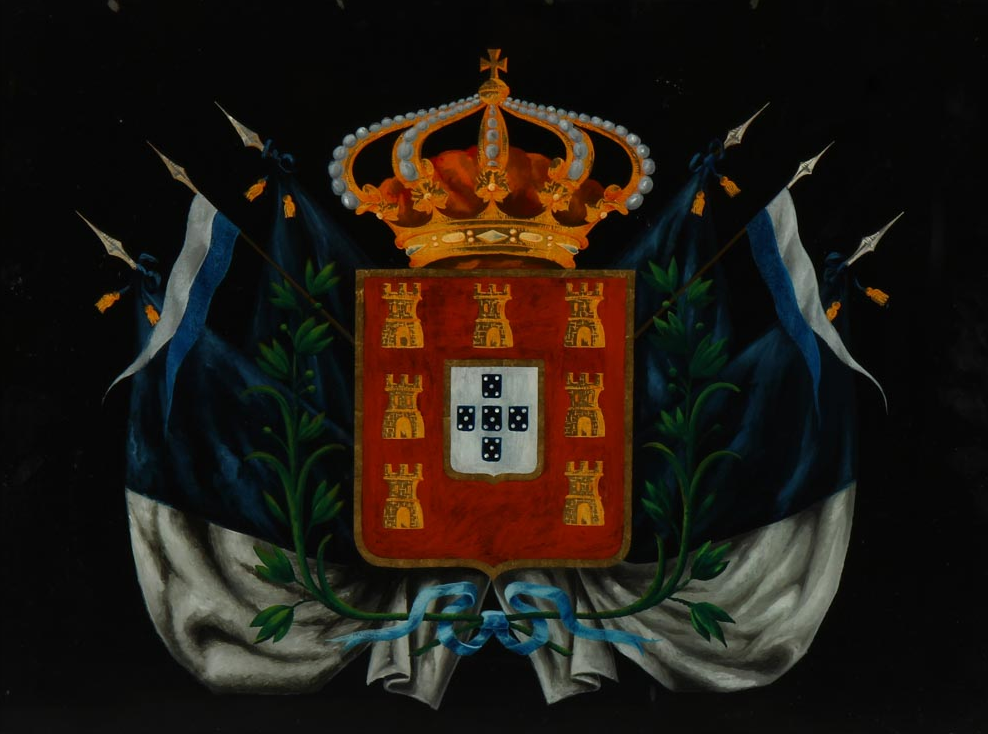
Royal coat of arms in a glass painting of the early 20th century

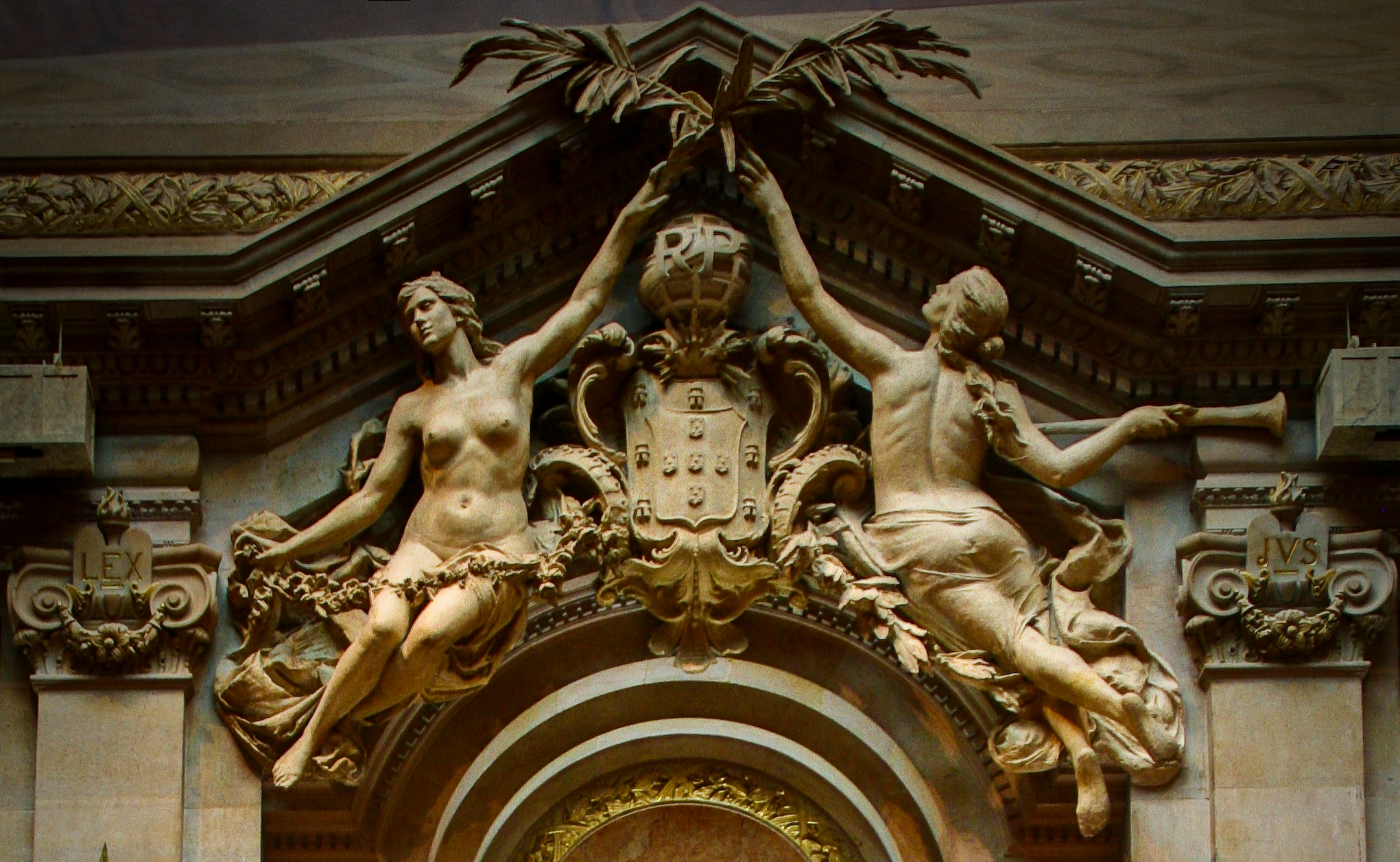
Coat of arms in the Chamber of Sessions of the São Bento Palace

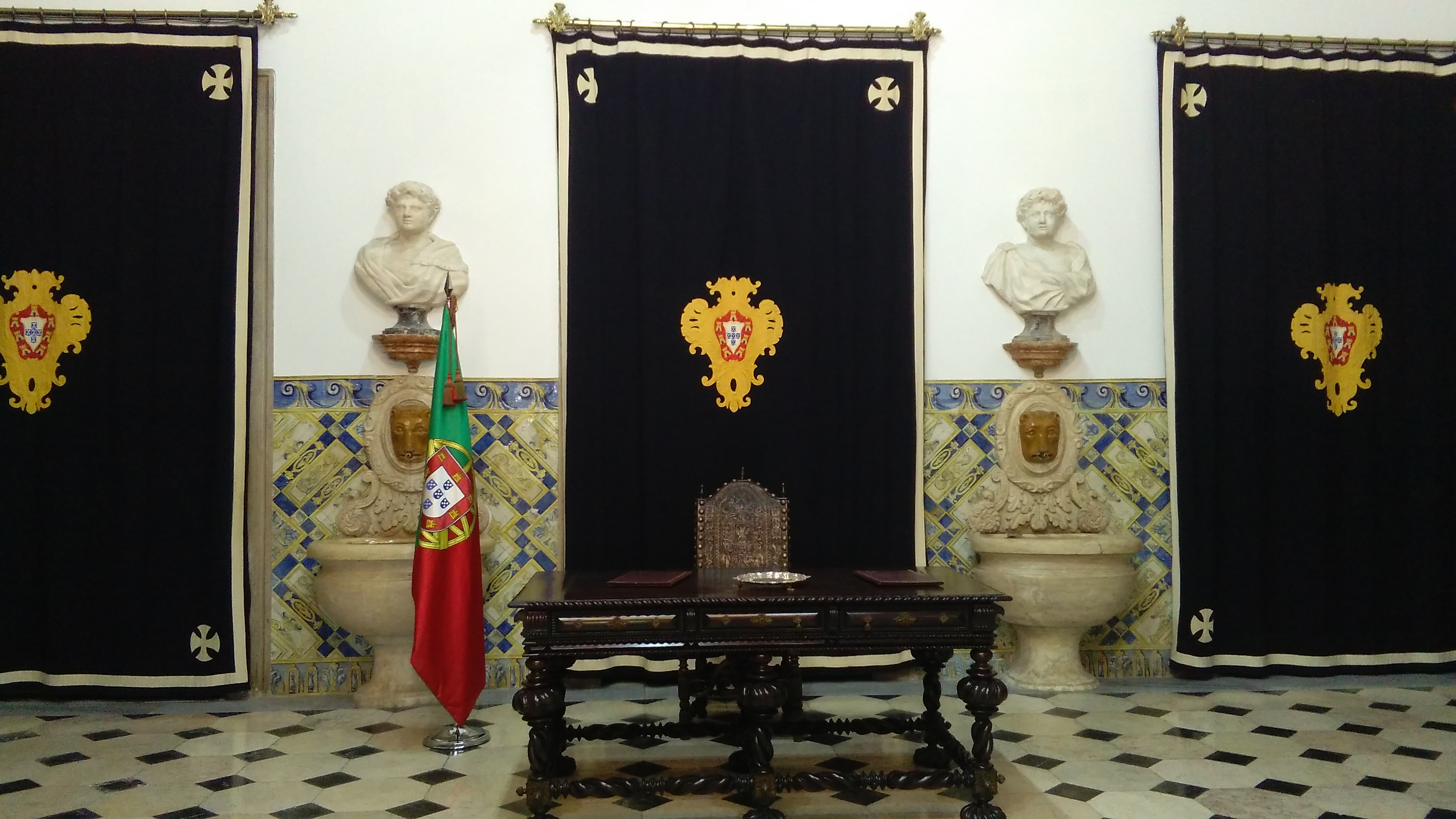
Baroque style Portuguese coat of arms in the black tapestries used in the ceremonial office of Belém Palace

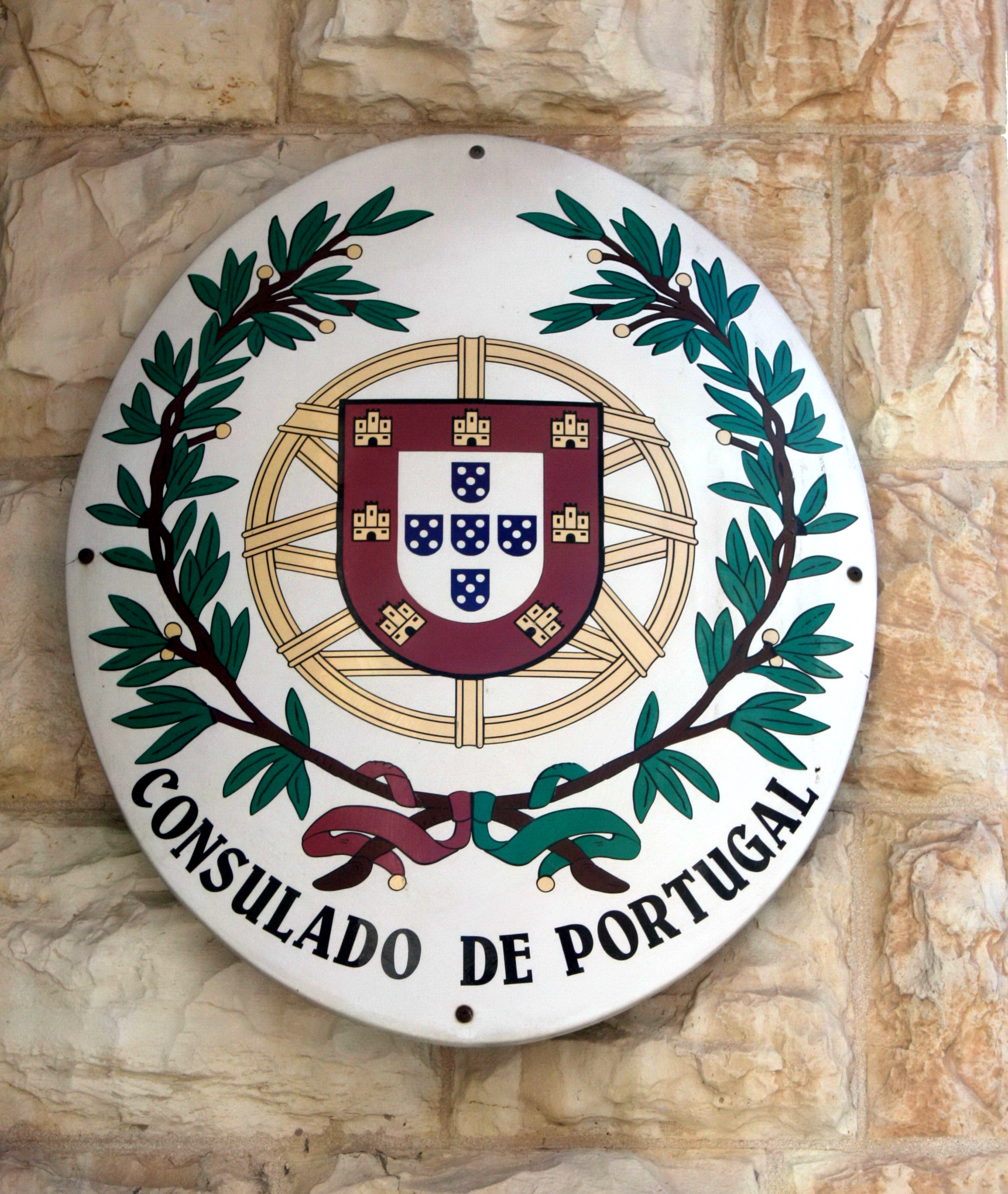
Coat of arms in the plaque of the Portuguese consulate at Haifa

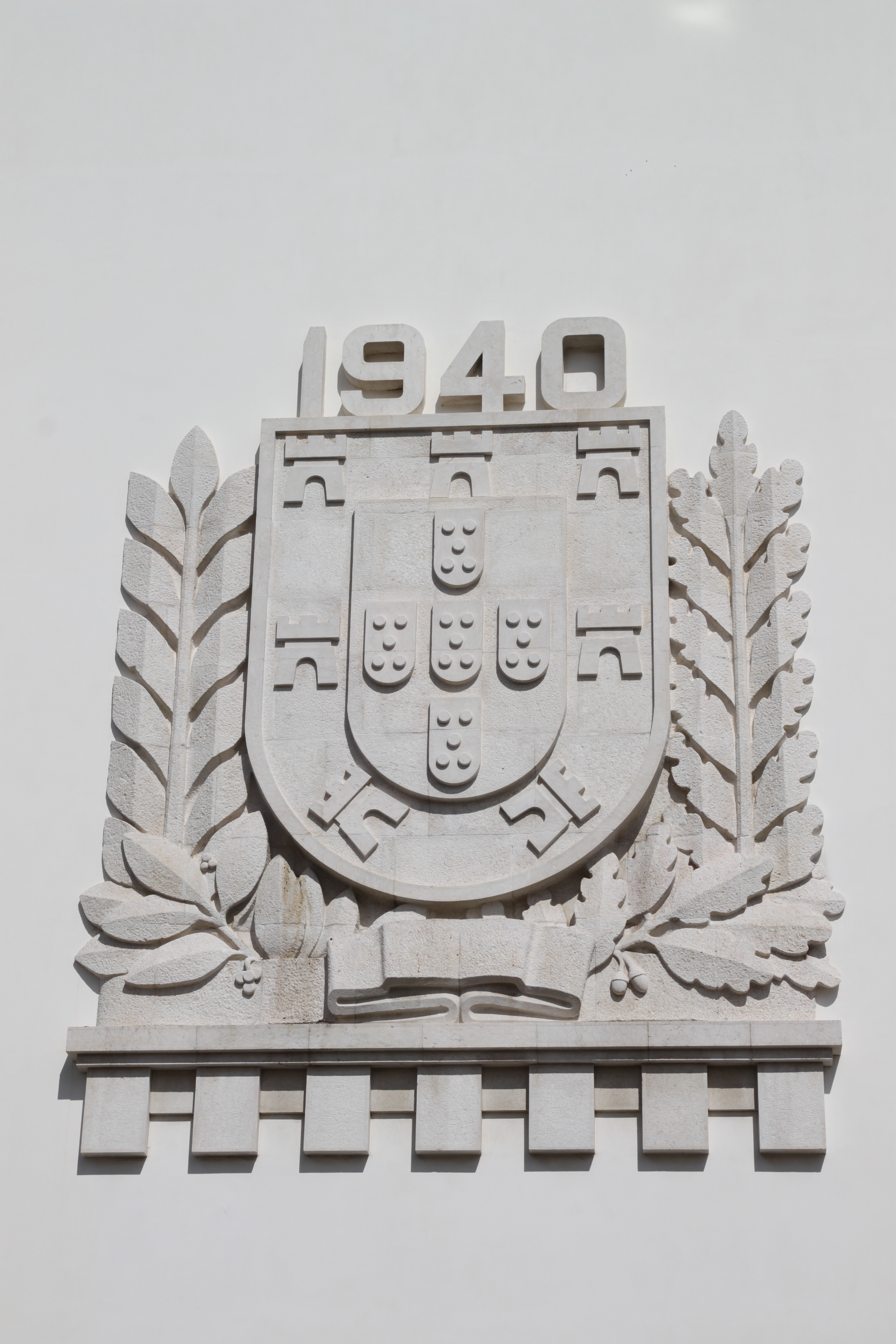
Monumental, modernist style coat of arms in a public building of 1940 (present Museum of the Orient) in Lisbon

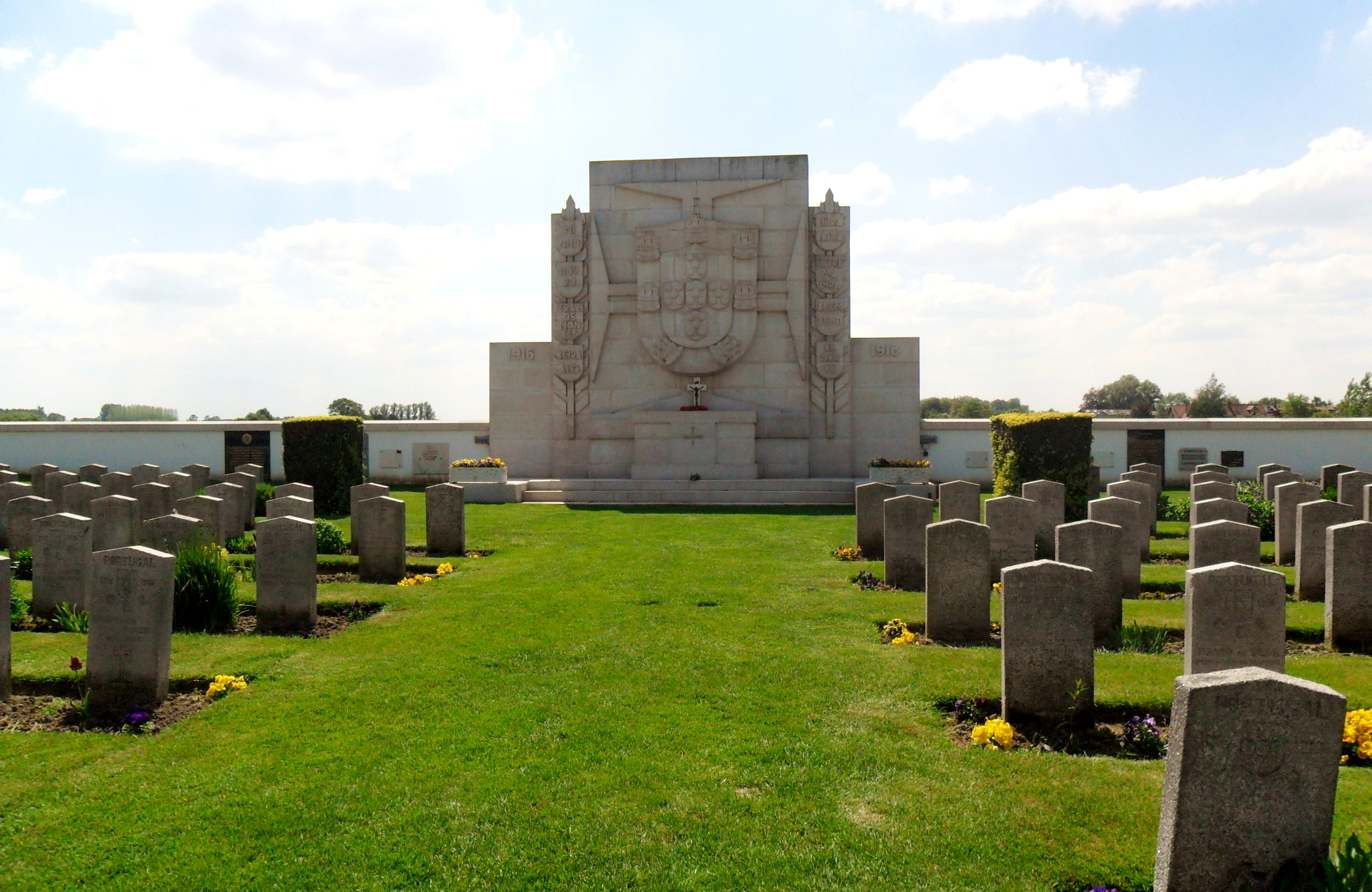
Monumental coat of arms of Portugal at the Portuguese war cemetery in Neuve-Chappelle.

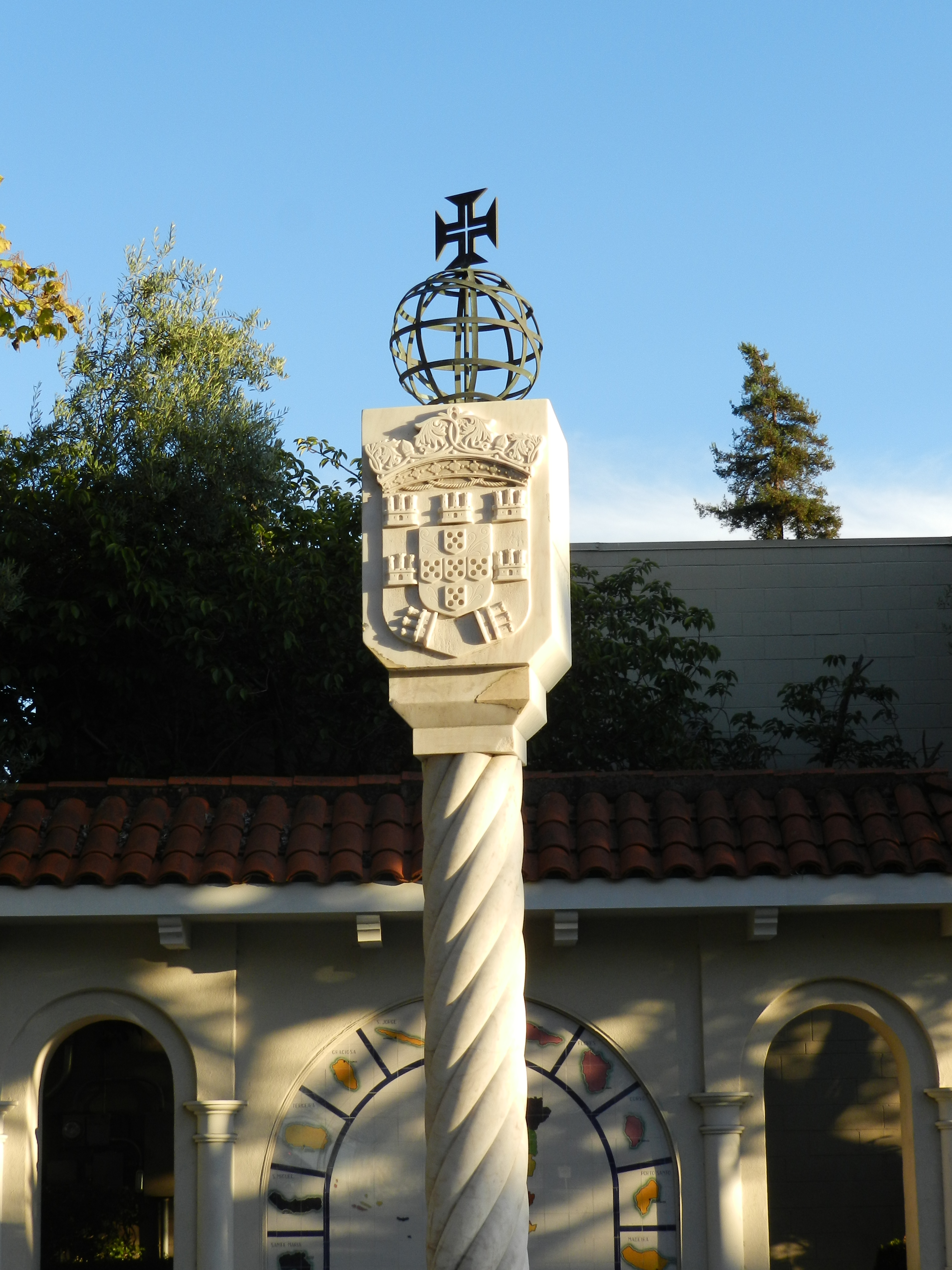
Royalist style Portuguese coat of arms on a column at Julio Bras Portuguese Park in Hayward, California

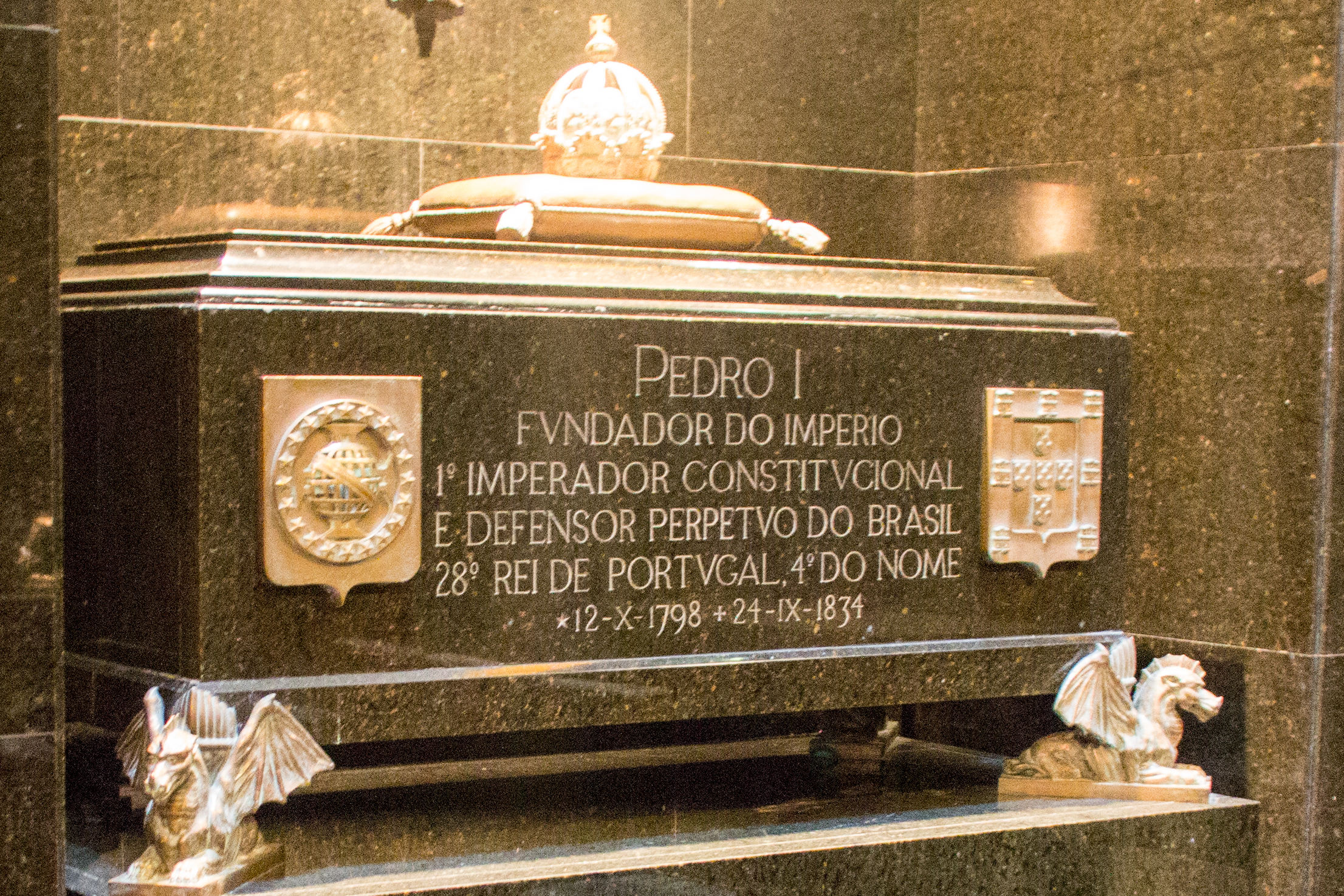
(On the right) Portuguese coat of arms on the tomb of Emperor Pedro I at São Paulo, Brazil

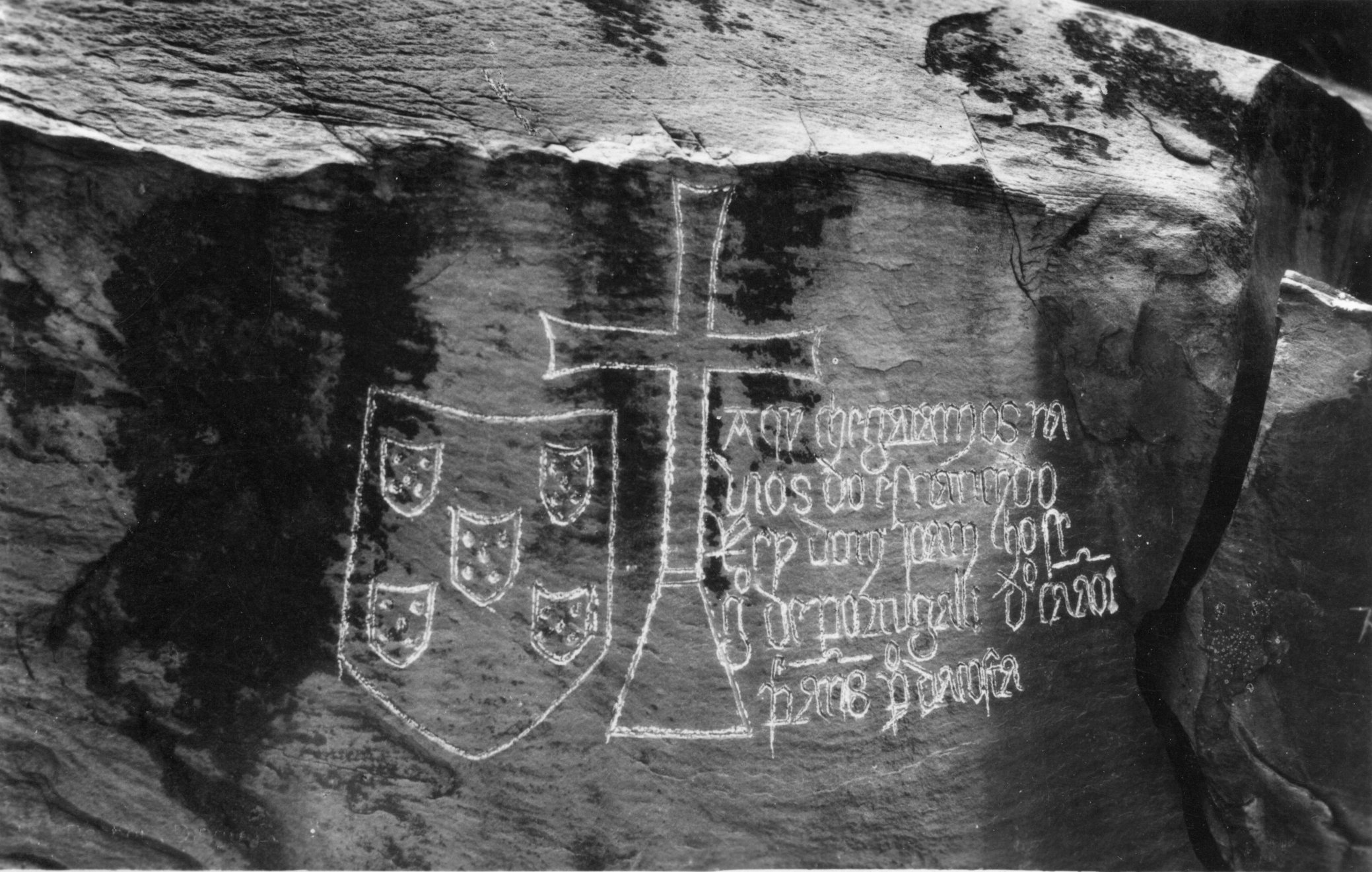
Portuguese arms carved on the Ielala Stone in Angola.

== See also ==
- Portuguese heraldry
- Flag of Portugal
- History of Portugal
- Armorial of Portuguese colonies
- Coat of arms of the Azores
- Coat of arms of Madeira
- Coat of arms of Ceuta
