= Northern goshawk =

The northern goshawk has been split into two species based on significant morphological and genetic differences:

- Eurasian goshawk, Astur gentilis
- American goshawk, Astur atricapillus
