= Trophic =

Trophic, from Ancient Greek τροφικός (trophikos) "pertaining to food or nourishment", may refer to:

- Trophic cascade, in ecosystems
- Trophic coherence, in graph theory and ecology
- Trophic egg
- Trophic function
- Trophic hormone
- Trophic level index
- Trophic level
- Trophic mutualism
- Trophic pyramid
- Trophic species
- Trophic state index

== See also ==
- Food
- Tropic (disambiguation)
