= Tritrophic interactions in plant defense =

Ecological interactions

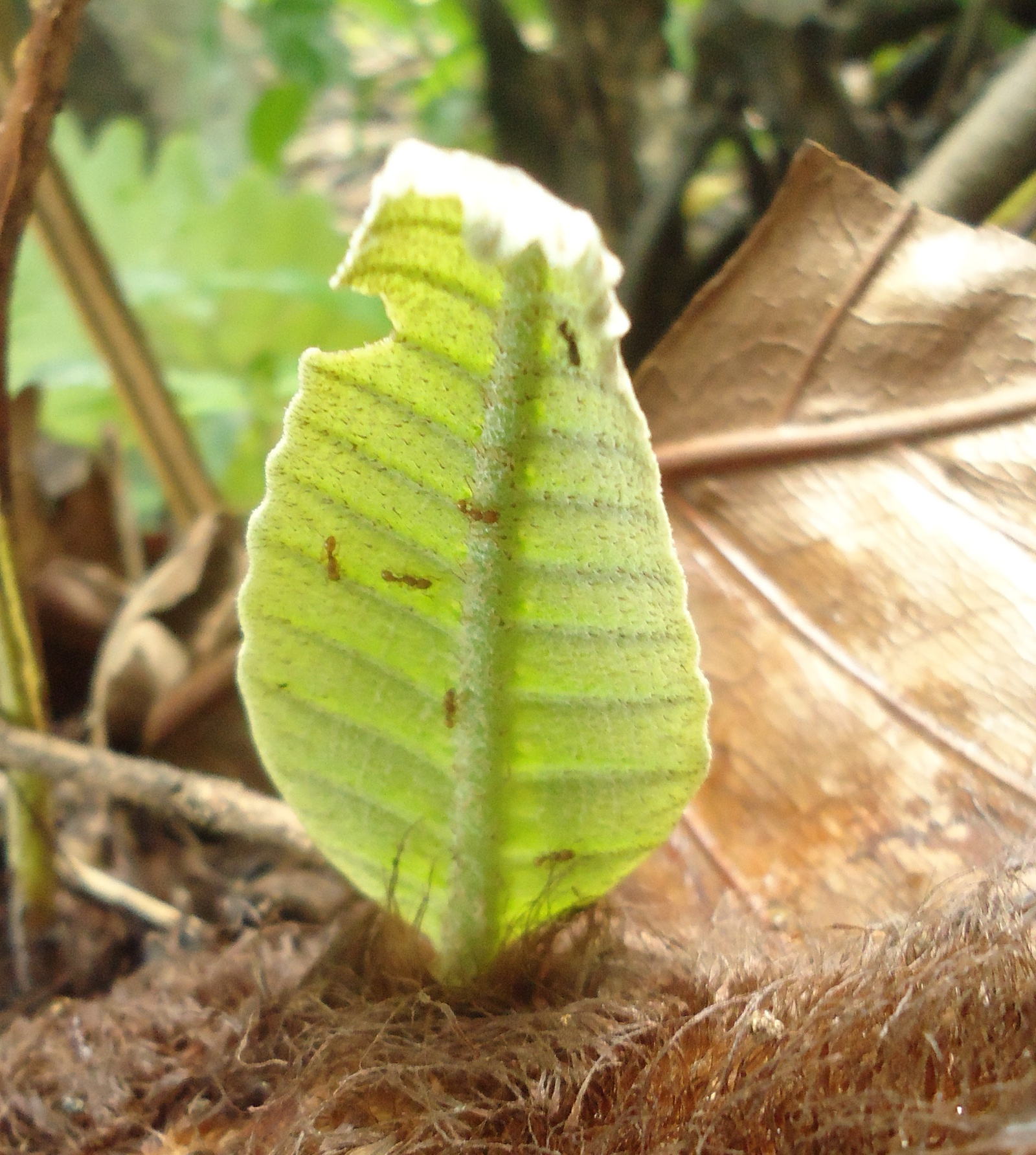
Ants attracted by the nutritional reward provided by extrafloral nectaries of a Drynaria quercifolia frond participate in a three-part interaction of plant, herbivorous insects, and themselves as predators.

Tritrophic interactions in plant defense against herbivory describe the ecological impacts of three trophic levels on each other: the plant, the herbivore, and its natural enemies. They may also be called multitrophic interactions when further trophic levels, such as soil microbes, endophytes, or hyperparasitoids (higher-order predators) are considered. Tritrophic interactions join pollination and seed dispersal as vital biological functions which plants perform via cooperation with animals.

Natural enemies—predators, pathogens, and parasitoids that attack plant-feeding insects—can benefit plants by hindering the feeding behavior of the harmful insect. It is thought that many plant traits have evolved in response to this mutualism to make themselves more attractive to natural enemies. This recruitment of natural enemies functions to protect against excessive herbivory and is considered an indirect plant defense mechanism. Traits attractive to natural enemies can be physical, as in the cases of domatia and nectaries; or chemical, as in the case of induced plant volatile chemicals that help natural enemies pinpoint a food source.

Humans can take advantage of tritrophic interactions in the biological control of insect pests.

== Chemical mechanisms of enemy attraction ==
Plants produce secondary metabolites known as allelochemicals. Rather than participating in basic metabolic processes, they mediate interactions between a plant and its environment, often attracting, repelling, or poisoning insects. They also help produce secondary cell wall components such as those that require amino acid modification.

In a tritrophic system, volatiles, which are released into the air, are superior to surface chemicals in drawing foraging natural enemies from afar. Plants also produce root volatiles which will drive tritrophic interactions between below-ground herbivores and their natural enemies. Some plant volatiles can be smelled by humans and give plants like basil, eucalyptus, and pine their distinctive odors. The mixture and ratios of individual volatiles emitted by a plant under given circumstances (also referred to as synomones in the context of natural enemy attraction) is referred to as a volatile profile. These are highly specific to certain plant species and are detectable meters from the source. Predators and parasitoids exploit the specificity of volatile profiles to navigate the complex infochemical signals presented by plants in their efforts to locate a particular prey species.

The production of volatiles is likely to be beneficial given two conditions: that they are effective in attracting natural enemies and that the natural enemies are effective in removing or impeding herbivores. However, volatile chemicals may not have evolved initially for this purpose; they act in within-plant signaling, attraction of pollinators, or repulsion of herbivores that dislike such odors.

=== Induced defenses ===
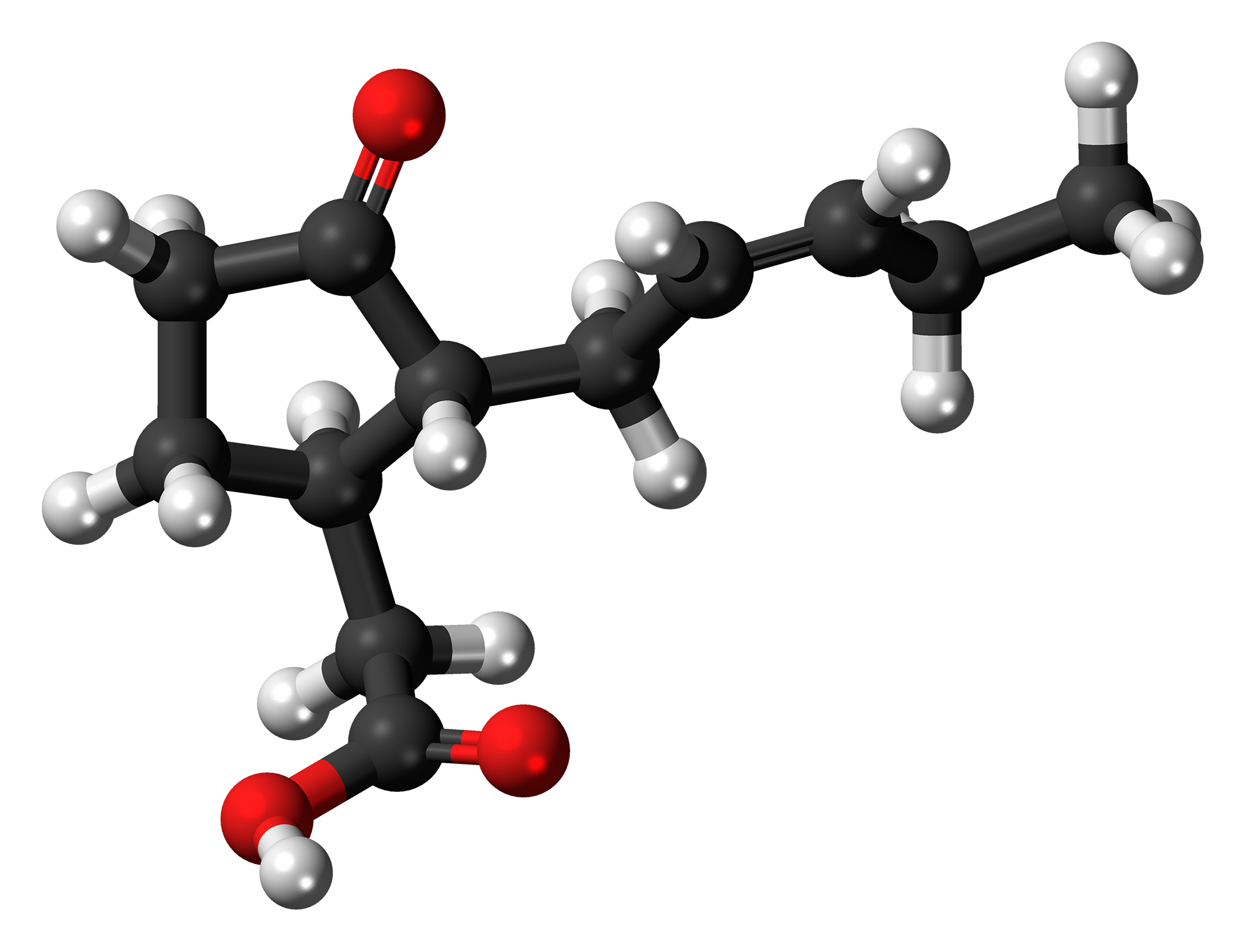
Jasmonic acid, a herbivore-induced plant volative, helps to attract natural enemies of plant pests.

When an herbivore starts eating a plant, the plant may respond by increasing its production of volatiles or changing its volatile profile. This plasticity is controlled by either the jasmonic acid pathway or the salicylic acid pathway, depending largely on the herbivore; these substances are often called herbivore-induced plant volatiles (HIPVs). The plant hormone jasmonic acid increases in concentration when plants are damaged and is responsible for inducing the transcription of enzymes that synthesize secondary metabolites. This hormone also aids in the production of defensive proteins such as α-amylase inhibitors, as well as lectins. Since α-amylase breaks down starch, α-amylase inhibitors prevent insects from deriving nutrition from starch. Lectins likewise interfere with insect nutrient absorption as they bind to carbohydrates.

Though volatiles of any kind have an attractive effect on natural enemies, this effect is stronger for damaged plants than for undamaged plants, perhaps because induced volatiles signal definitive and recent herbivore activity. The inducibility gives rise to the idea that plants are sending out a "distress call" to the third trophic level in times of herbivore attack.

Natural enemies can distinguish between mechanical tissue damage, which might occur during events other than herbivory, and damage that is the direct result of insect feeding behavior. The presence of herbivore saliva or regurgitant mediates this differentiation, and the resulting chemical pathway leads to a stronger natural enemy response than mechanical damage could. The reliability of HIPVs in broadcasting the location of prey means that, for many foraging enemies, induced plant volatiles are more attractive than even the odors emitted by the prey insect itself.

Plants are able to determine what types of herbivore species are present, and will react differently given the herbivore's traits. If certain defense mechanisms are not effective, plants may turn to attracting natural enemies of herbivore populations. For example, wild tobacco plants use nicotine, a neurotoxin, to defend against herbivores. However, when faced with nicotine-tolerant herbivores, they will attract natural enemies.

=== Local and systemic signals ===
When herbivores trigger an inducible chemical defense pathway, the resulting HIPVs may be emitted either from the site of feeding damage (local induction) or from undamaged tissues belonging to a damaged plant (systemic induction). For example, when an herbivore feeds on a single corn seedling leaf, the plant will emit volatiles from all its leaves, whether or not they too have been damaged. Locally induced defenses aid parasitoids in targeting their foraging behaviors to the exact location of the herbivore on the plant. Systemic defenses are less spatially specific and may serve to confuse the enemy once the source plant is located. A plant might employ both local and systemic responses simultaneously.

== Morphological mechanisms of enemy attraction ==
=== Domatia ===
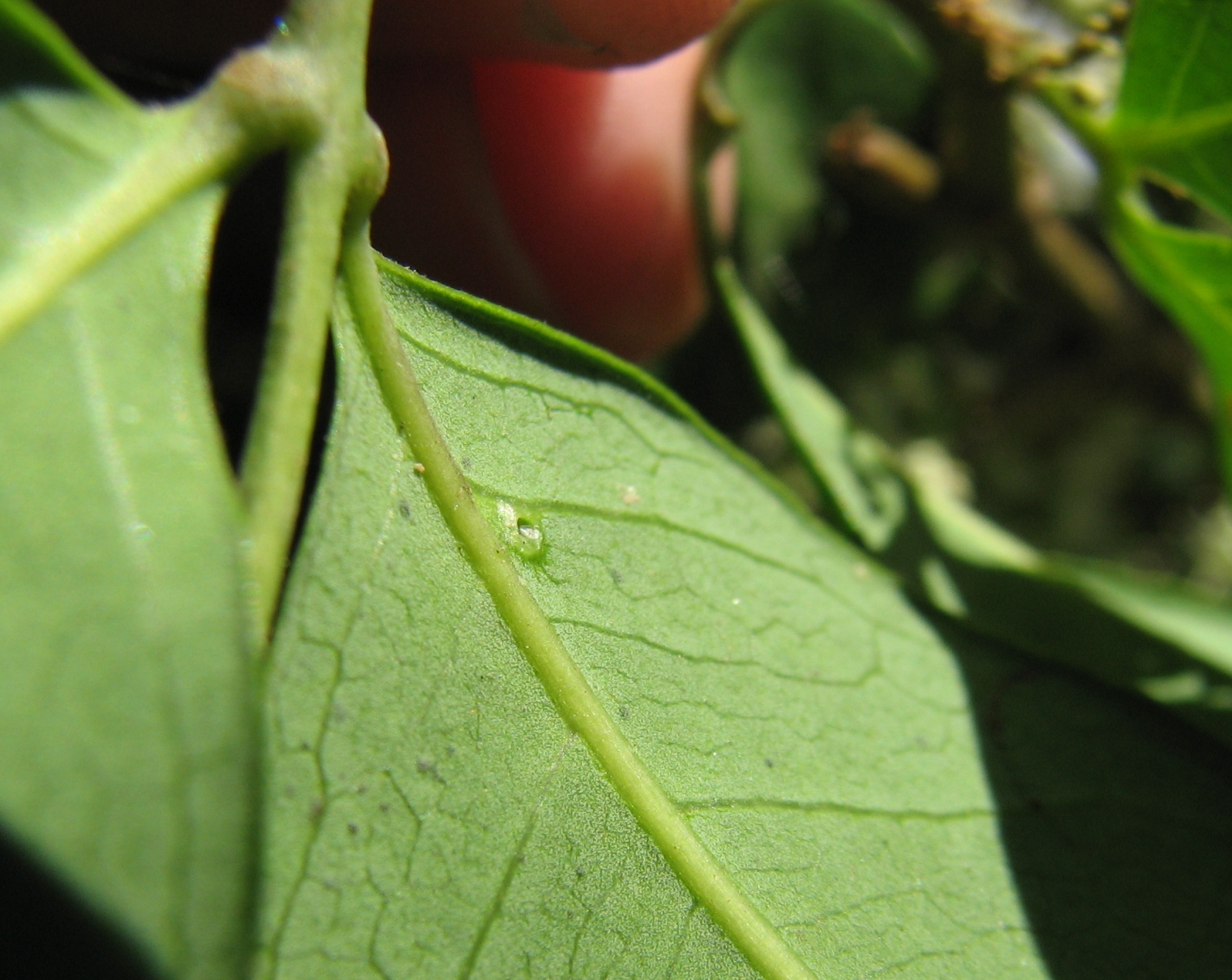
A hairless foveole domatium in the leaf underside of Guioa acutifolia

Natural enemies must survive long enough and respond quickly enough to plant volatiles in order to benefit the plant through predatory behavior. Certain plant structures, called domatia, can selectively reinforce mutualisms with natural enemies and increase the fitness benefit they receive from that mutualism by ensuring the survival and proximity of natural enemies. Domatia provide a kind of housing or refuge for predators from both abiotic stressors, such as desiccation, and biotic stressors, such as predation from higher-order predators. Therefore, they not only ensure better survival, but eliminate the time required for natural enemies to locate and travel to the damaged plant. Natural enemies that make use of domatia are often said to serve as "bodyguards" for the plant on or in which they live. Domatia may be as well-developed as acacia tree thorns or as simple and incidental as a depression or crevice in a leaf stem, but they are distinguishable from galls and other similar structures in that they are not induced by the insect but formed constitutively by the plant.

=== Nutritional rewards ===
As long as natural enemies have some potential to be omnivorous, plants can provide food resources to encourage their retention and increase the impact they have on herbivore populations. This potential, however, can hinge on a number of the insect's traits. For example, hemipteran predators can use their sucking mouthparts to make use of leaves, stems, and fruits, but spiders with chelicerae cannot. Still, insects widely considered to be purely carnivorous have been observed to diverge from expected feeding behavior. Some plants simply tolerate a low level of herbivory by natural enemies for the service they provide in ridding the plant of more serious herbivores. Others, however, have structures thought to serve no purpose other than attracting and provisioning natural enemies. These structures derive from a long history of coevolution between the first and third trophic levels. A good example is the extrafloral nectaries that many myrmecophytes and other angiosperms sport on leaves, bracts, stems, and fruits. Nutritionally, extrafloral nectaries are similar to floral nectaries, but they do not lead the visiting insect to come into contact with pollen. Their existence is therefore not the product of a pollinator–plant mutualism, but rather a tritrophic, defensive interaction.

== Herbivore sequestration of plant defensive compounds ==
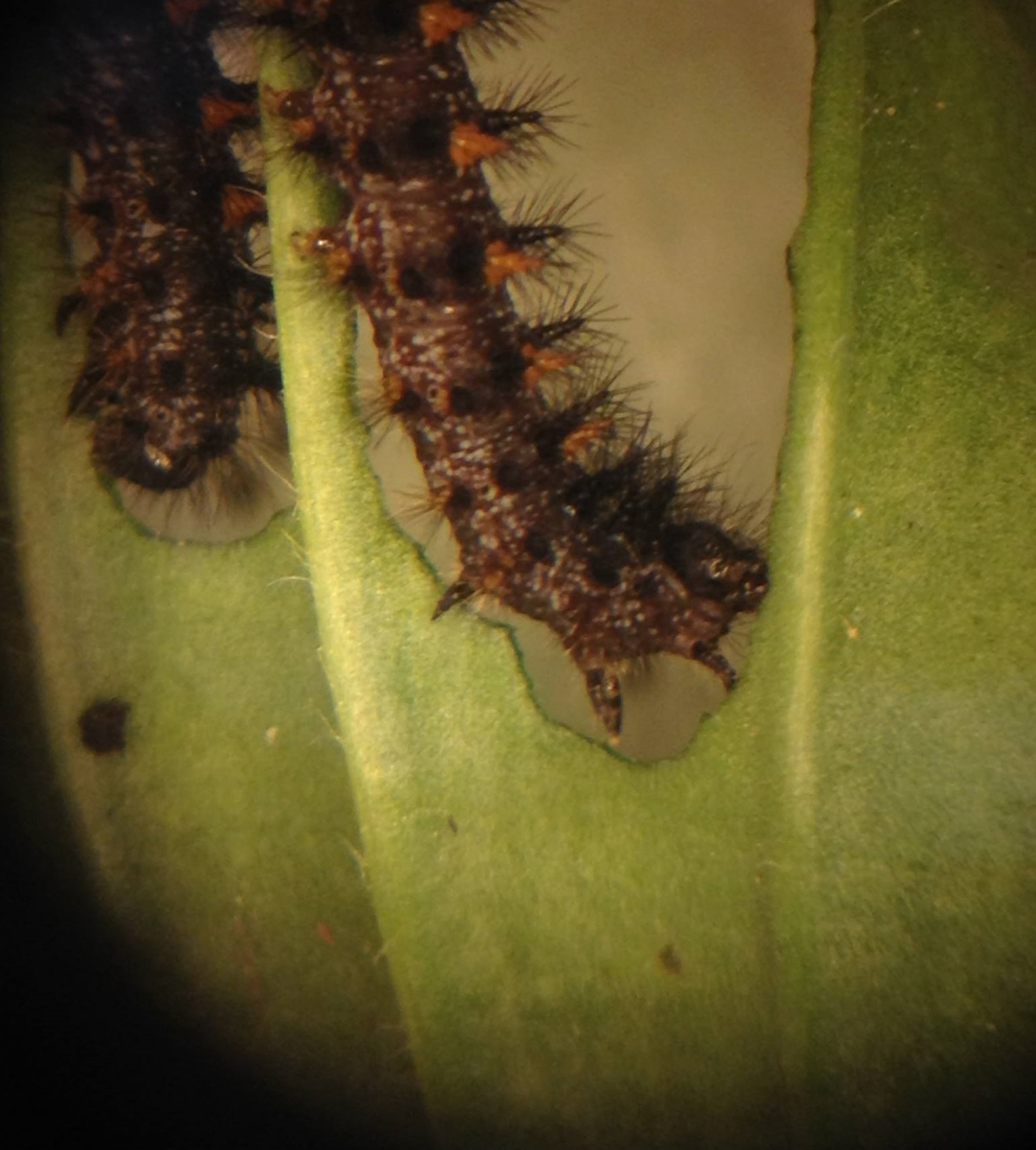
Multitrophic interaction: Euphydryas editha taylori larvae sequester defensive compounds from specific types of plants they consume to protect themselves from bird predators

The field of chemical ecology has elucidated additional types of plant multitrophic interactions that entail the transfer of defensive compounds across multiple trophic levels. For example, certain plant species in the Castilleja and Plantago genera have been found to produce defensive compounds called iridoid glycosides that are sequestered in the tissues of the Taylor's checkerspot butterfly larvae that have developed a tolerance for these compounds and are able to consume the foliage of these plants. These sequestered iridoid glycosides then confer chemical protection against bird predators to the butterfly larvae. Another example of this sort of multitrophic interaction in plants is the transfer of defensive alkaloids produced by endophytes living within a grass host to a hemiparasitic plant that is also using the grass as a host.

== Human uses ==
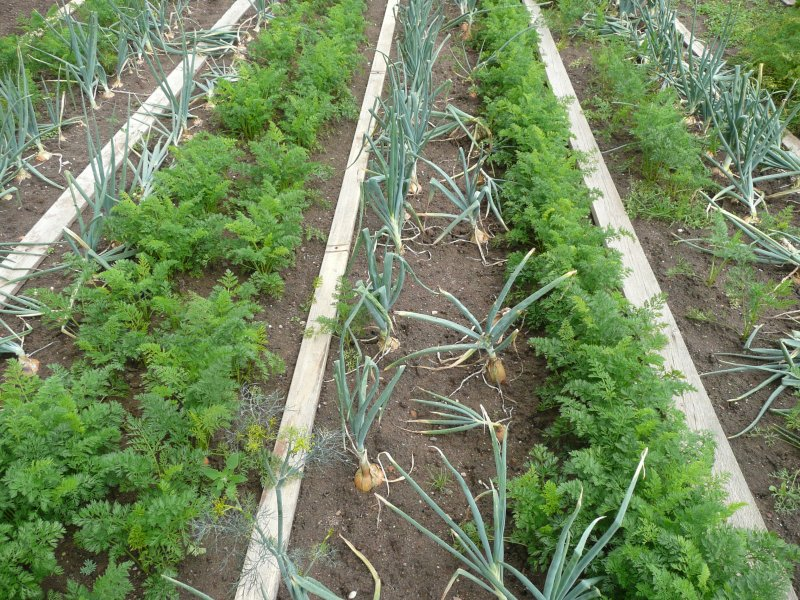
Companion planting controls pests partly by favouring natural enemies.

Exploitation of tritrophic interactions can benefit agricultural systems. Biocontrol of crop pests can be exerted by the third trophic level, given an adequate population of natural enemies. However, the widespread use of pesticides or Bt crops can undermine natural enemies’ success. In some cases, populations of predators and parasitoids are decimated, necessitating even greater use of insecticide because the ecological service they provided in controlling herbivores has been lost.

Even when pesticides are not widely used, monocultures often have difficulty support natural enemies in great enough numbers for them to diminish pest populations. A lack of diversity in the first trophic level is linked to low abundance in the third because alternative resources that are necessary for stable, large natural enemy populations are missing from the system. Natural enemy diets can be subsidized by increasing landscape diversity through companion planting, border crops, cover crops, intercropping, or tolerance of some weed growth. When nectar or other sugar-rich resources are provided, the natural enemy population thrives.

=== Biological control ===
==== Morphological plant characteristics and natural enemy success ====
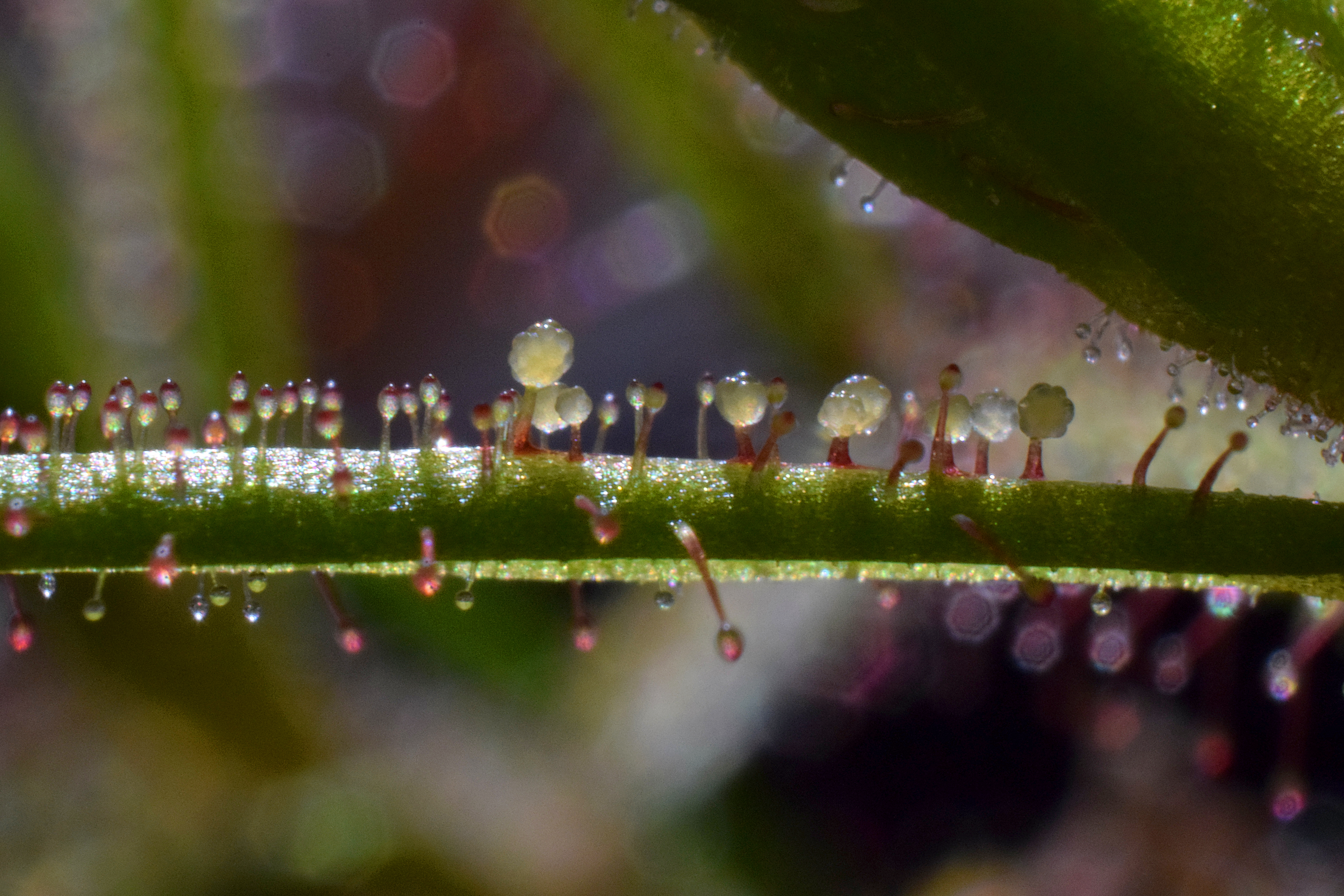
Glandular trichomes found on Drosera hartmeyerorum

Beyond domatia and nutritional rewards, other plant characteristics influence the colonization of plants by natural enemies. These can include the physical size, shape, density, maturity, colour, and texture of a given plant species. Specific plant features such as the hairiness or glossiness of vegetation can have mixed effects on different natural enemies. For example, trichomes decrease hunting efficiency of many natural enemies, as trichomes tend to slow or prevent movement due to the physical obstacles they present or the adhesive secretions they produce. However, sometimes the prey species may be more impeded than the predator. For example, when the whitefly prey of the parasitoid Encarsia formosa is slowed by plant hairs, the parasitoid can detect and parasitize a higher number of juvenile whiteflies.

Many predatory coccinelid beetles have a preference for the type of leaf surface they frequent. Presented with the opportunity to land on glossy or hairy Brassica oleracea foliage, the beetles prefer the glossy foliage as they are better able to cling to these leaves. Studies are evaluating the effect of various plant genotypes on natural enemies.

==== Volatile organic compounds ====
Two ways the release of volatile organic compounds (VOCs) may benefit plants are the deterrence of herbivores and the attraction of natural enemies. Synthetic products could replicate the distinct VOC profiles released by different plants; these products could be applied to plants suffering from pests that are targeted by the attracted natural enemy. This could cause natural enemies to enter crops that are occupied by pest populations that would otherwise likely remain undetected by the natural enemies.

The four elements that must be considered before manipulating VOCs are as follows: The VOCs must effectively aid the natural enemy in finding the prey; the pest must have natural enemies present; the fitness cost of potentially attracting more herbivores must be exceeded by attracting natural enemies; and the natural enemies must not be negatively affected by direct plant defenses that may be present.

==== Extrafloral nectaries ====
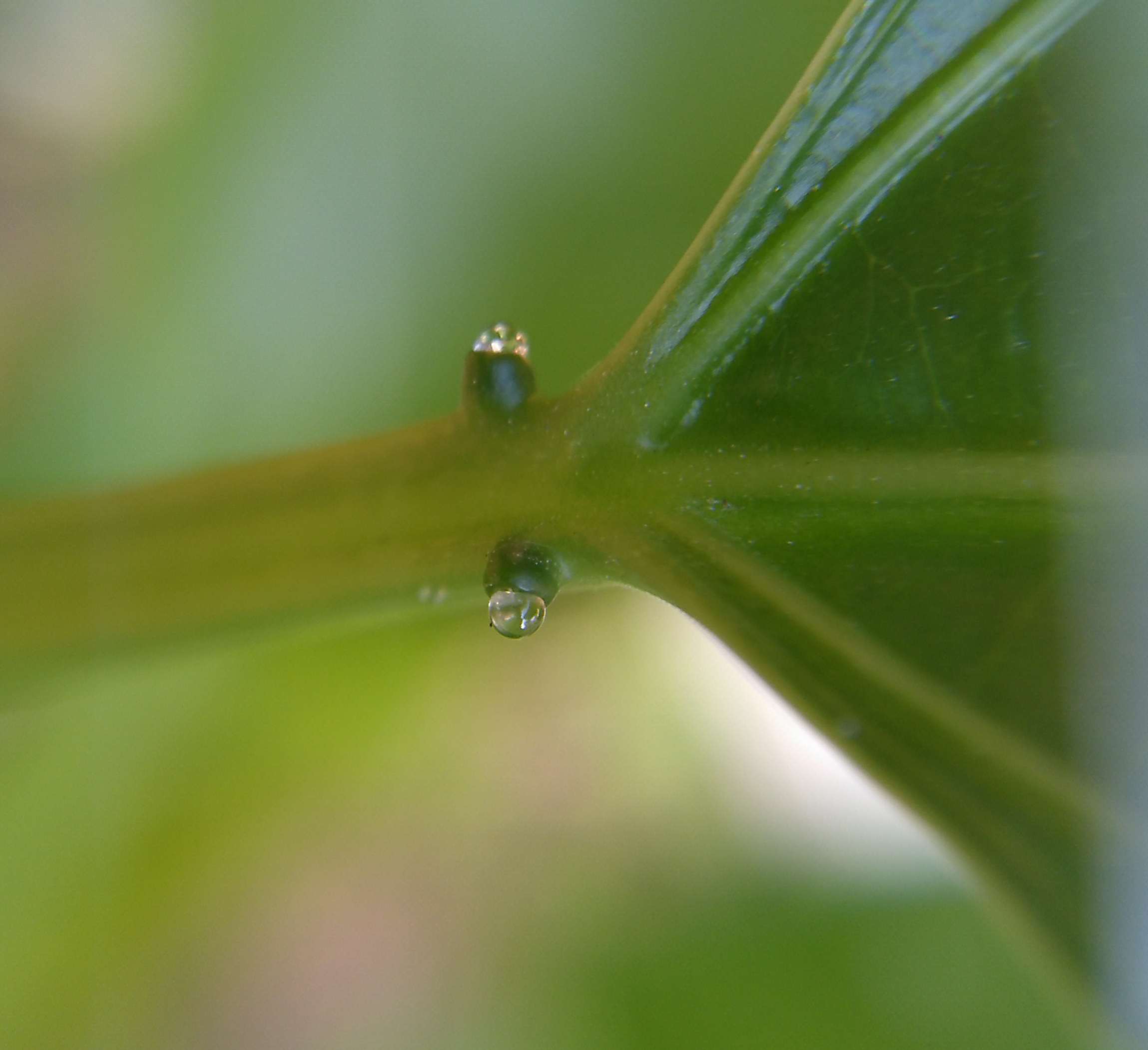
A pair of extrafloral nectaries secreting nectar from a Passiflora edulis leaf

The level of domestication of cotton plants correlates to indirect defense investment in the form of extrafloral nectaries. Wild varieties produce higher volumes of nectar and attract a wider variety of natural enemies. Thus, the process of breeding new cotton varieties has overlooked natural resistance traits in the pursuit of high-yielding varieties that can be protected by pesticides. Plants bearing extrafloral nectaries have lower pest levels along with greater levels of natural enemies. These findings illustrate the potential benefits that could be gained through incorporating the desirable genetics of wild varieties into cultivated varieties.

==== Domatia ====
Certain tropical plants host colonies of ants in their hollow domatia and provide the ants with nutrition delivered from nectaries or food bodies. These ant colonies have become dependent on the host plants for their survival and therefore actively protect the plant; this protection can take the form of killing or warding off pests, weeds, and certain fungal pathogens. Chinese citrus farmers have capitalized on this mutualistic relationship for many years by incorporating artificial ant nests into their crops to suppress pests.

==== Parasitoids ====
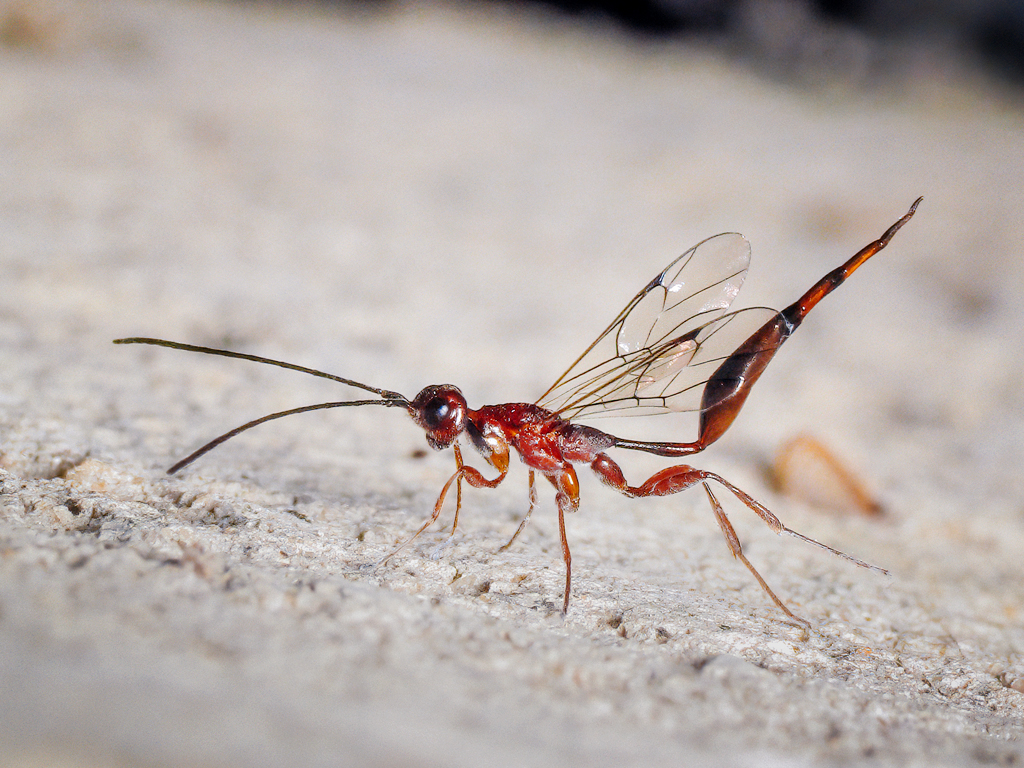
A Brazilian parasitoid wasp raising its ovipositor.

Parasitoids have successfully been incorporated into biological pest control programs for many years. Plants can influence the effect of parasitoids on herbivores by releasing chemical cues that attract parasitoids and by providing food sources or domatia. Certain parasitoids may be dependent on this plant relationship. Therefore, in agricultural areas where parasitoid presence is desired, ensuring the crops being grown meet all of these requirements is likely to promote higher parasitoid populations and better pest control.

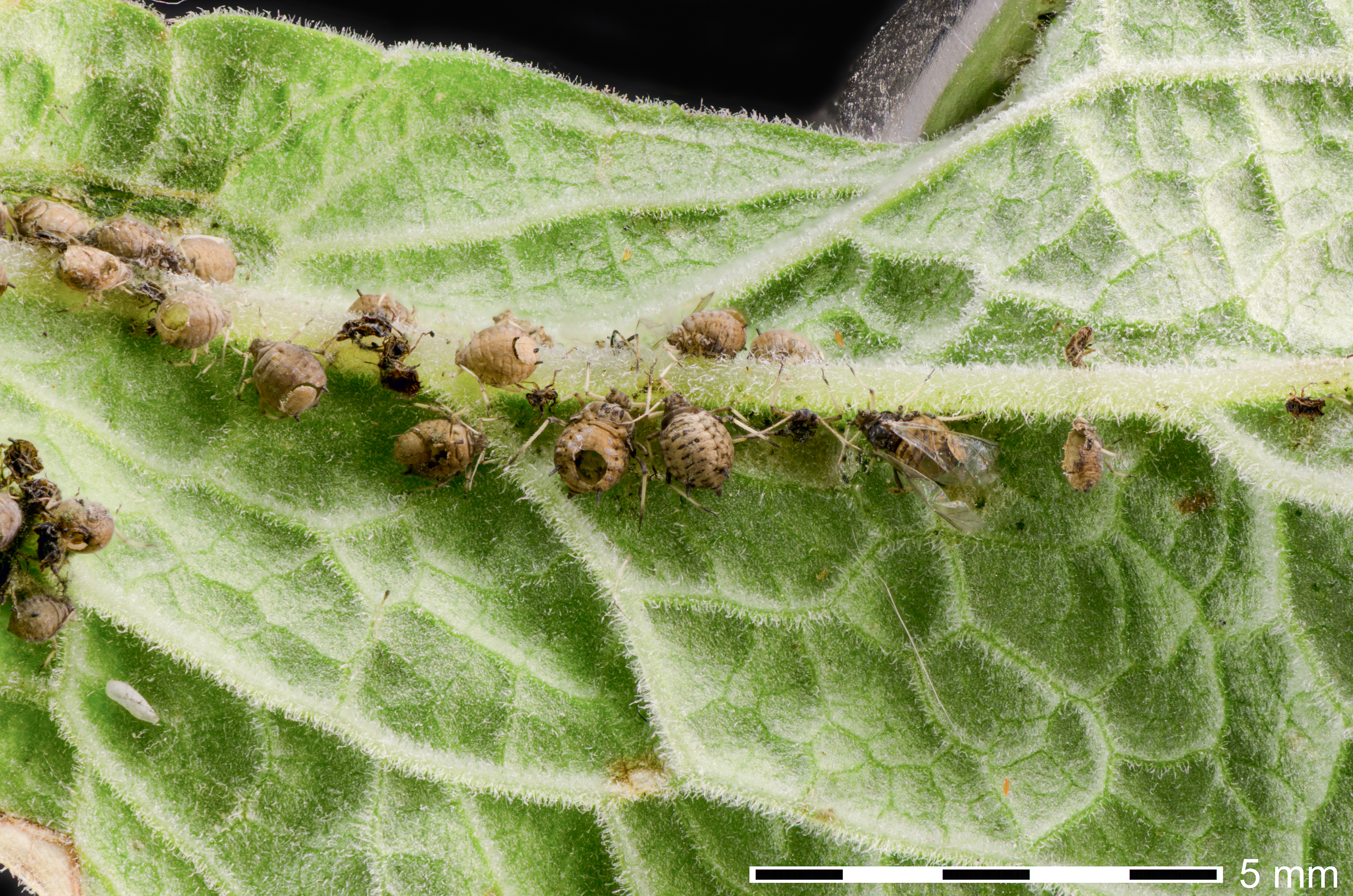
Parasitized aphids with visible parasitoid wasp exit holes.

In a sugar beet crop, when only beets were grown, few aphids were parasitized. However, when collard crops were grown next to the sugar beets, parasitism of aphids increased. Collard crops release more VOCs than sugar beets. As a result, the companion collard plants attract more aphid parasitoids, which kill aphids in both the collard and the nearby sugar beets.

In a related study, ethylene and other compounds released by rice plants in response to brown planthopper feeding attracted a facultative parasitoid that parasitizes brown planthopper eggs.

In another study, the presence of plant extrafloral nectaries in cotton crops caused parasitoids to spend more time in the cotton and led to the parasitization of more moth larva than in cotton crops with no nectaries. Since the publication of this study, most farmers have switched to cotton varieties with nectaries. A separate study found that a naturalized cotton variety emitted seven times more VOCs than cultivated cotton varieties when experiencing feeding damage. It is unknown whether this generalizes to other crops; there are cases of other crops that do not show the same trend.

These findings reveal the specific variables a farmer can manipulate to influence parasitoid populations and illustrate the potential impact parasitoid habitat management can have on pest control. In the case of cotton and other similar high-VOC crop scenarios, there is interest in genetically engineering the chemical pathways of cultivated varieties to selectively produce the high VOC's that were observed in the naturalized varieties in order to attract greater natural enemy populations. This presents challenges but could produce promising pest control opportunities.

==== Insect pathogens ====
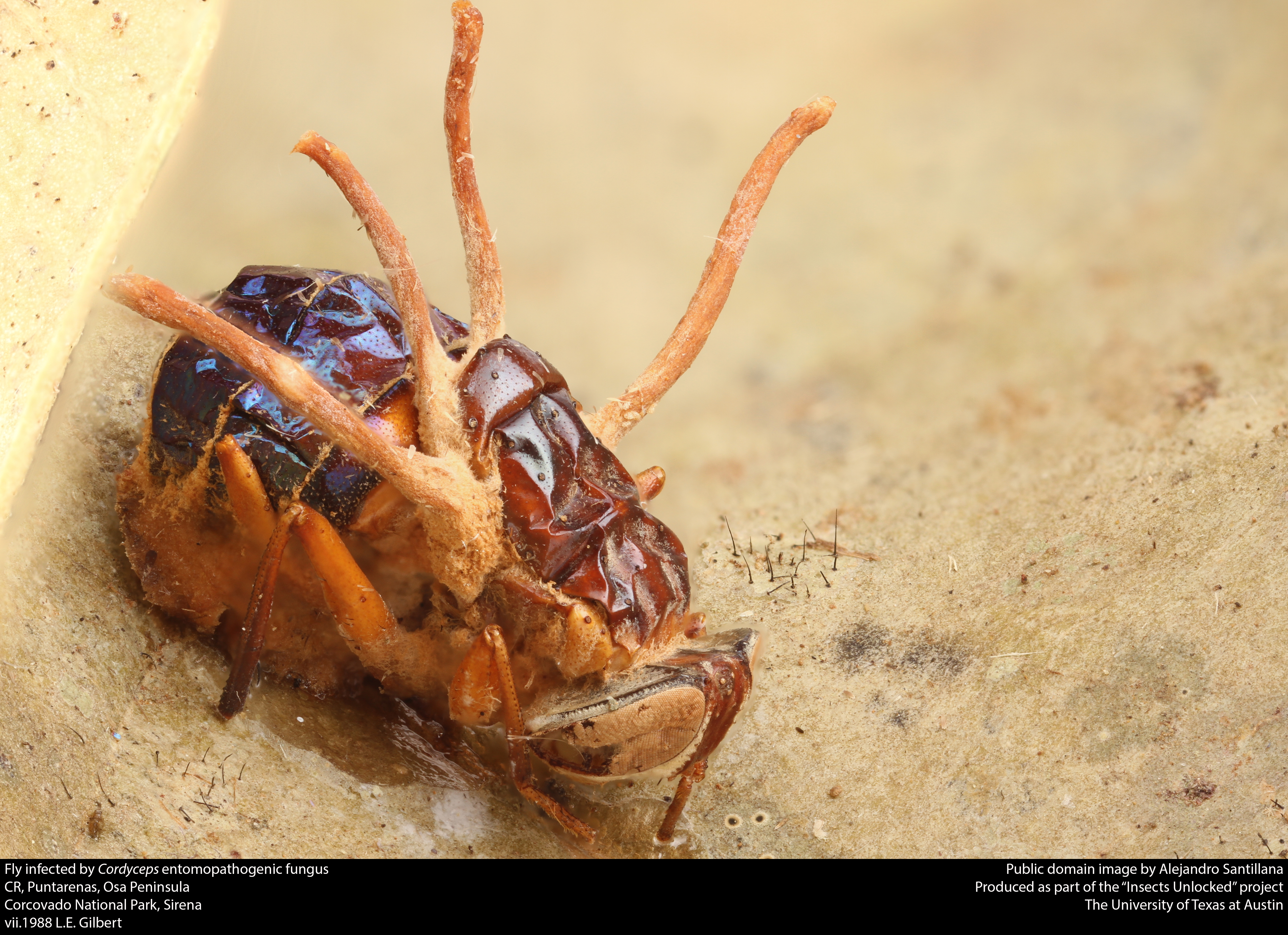
A fly infected by a Cordyceps entomopathogenic fungi with fruiting body structures present

Entomopathogens are another group of organisms that are influenced by plants. The extent of the influence largely depends on the evolutionary history shared between the two and the pathogens' method of infection and survival duration outside of a host. Different insect host plants contain compounds that cause modulate insect mortality when certain entomopathogens are simultaneously injected. Increases in mortality of up to 50-fold have been recorded. However, certain plants influence entomopathogens in negative ways, reducing their efficacy.

It is primarily the leaf surface of the plant that influences the entomopathogen; plants can release various exudates, phytochemicals, and alleolochemicals through their leaves, some of which have the ability to inactivate certain entomopathogens. In contrast, in other plant species, leaf characteristics can increase the efficacy of entomopathogens. For example, the mortality of pea aphids was higher in the group of aphids that were found on plants with fewer wax exudates than in those on plants with more wax exudates. This reduced waxiness increases the transmission of Pandora neoaphidus conidia from the plant to the aphids.

Feeding-induced volatiles emitted by different plants increase the amount of spores released by certain entomopathogenic fungi, increasing the likelihood of infection of some herbivores but not others. Plants can also influence pathogen efficacy indirectly, and this typically occurs either by increasing the susceptibility of the herbivore hosts or by changing their behavior. This influence can often take the form of altered growth rates, herbivore physiology, or feeding habits. Thus, there are various ways that host plant species can influence entomopathogenic interactions.

In one study, brassicas were found to defend themselves by acting as a vector for entomopathogens. Virus-infected aphids feeding on the plants introduce a virus into the phloem. The virus is passively transported in the phloem and carried throughout the plant. This causes aphids feeding apart from the infected aphids to become infected as well. This finding offers the possibility of injecting crops with compatible entomopathogenic viruses to defend against susceptible insect pests.

==== Below-ground tritrophic interactions ====
Less studied than above-ground interactions, but proving to be increasingly important, are the below-ground interactions that influence plant defense. There is a complex network of signal transduction pathways involved in plant responses to stimuli, and soil microbes can influence these responses. Certain soil microbes aid plant growth, producing increased tolerance to various environmental stressors, and can protect their host plants from many different pathogens by inducing systemic resistance. Organisms in above- and below-ground environments can interact indirectly through plants. Many studies have shown both the positive and negative effects that one organism in one environment can have on other organisms in the same or opposite environment, with the plant acting as the intermediary.

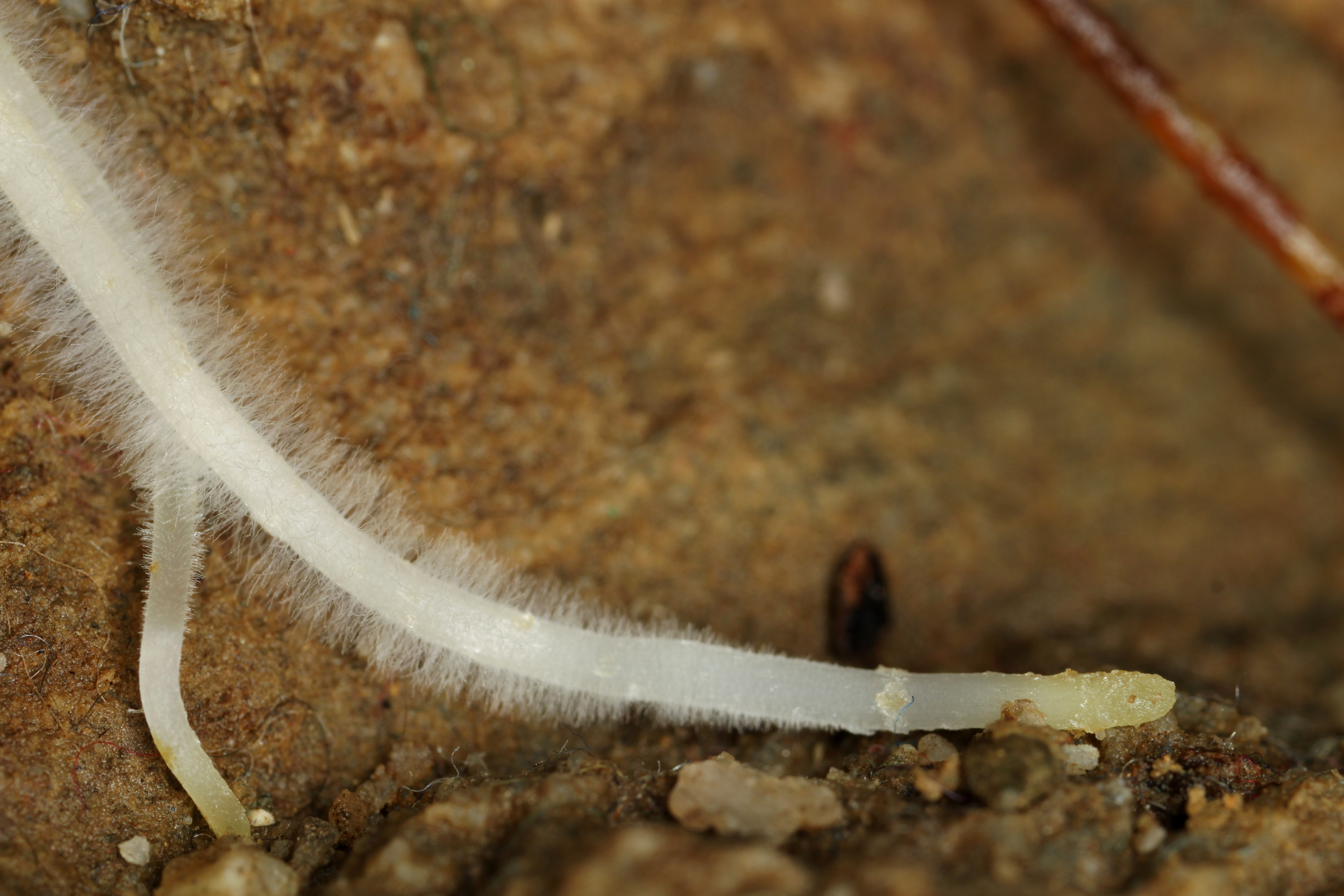
A mycorhizal association with a plant root

The colonization of plant roots with mycorhizae typically results in a mutualistic relationship between the plant and the fungus, inducing a number of changes in the plant. Such colonization has a mixed impact on herbivores; insects with different feeding methods are affected differently, some positively and others negatively. The mycorhizal species involved also matters. One common species, Rhizophagus irregularis, has been observed to have a negative effect on the feeding success of chewing herbivores, whereas other species studied have positive effects.

The roots of some maize plants produce a defense chemical when roots are damaged by leaf beetle larvae; this chemical attracts the entomopathogenic nematode species Heterorhabditis megidis. Only certain maize varieties produce this chemical; plants that release the chemical see up to five times as much parasitization of leaf beetle larvae as those that do not. Incorporating these varieties or their genes into commercial maize production could increase the efficacy of nematode treatments.

Further studies suggest that the plant-emitted chemicals act as the primary source of attractant to the nematodes. Herbivores are believed to have evolved to evade detection on the part of the nematodes, whereas the plants have evolved to release highly attractive chemical signals. A high degree of specificity is involved; species that make up these tritrophic interactions have evolved with one another over a long period of time and as a result have close interrelationships.

Microorganisms can also influence tritrophic interactions. The bacterium Klebsiella aerogenes produces the volatile 2,3-butanediol, which modulates interactions between plants, pathogens, and insects. When maize plants are grown in a soil culture containing the bacterium or the plants are inoculated with the bacterium, the maize is more resistant to the fungus Setosphaeria turcica. The bacterium does not deter insect herbivory; it actually increases weight gain and leaf consumption in the caterpillar Spodoptera littoralis. However, the parasitic wasp Cotesia marginiventris is attracted more readily to maize plants grown in soil cultures containing either the volatile-producing bacterium or pure 2,3-butanediol.

==== Considerations in utilizing tritrophic interactions in biological control ====
Sustainable crop production is becoming increasingly important, if humans are to support a growing population and avoid a collapse of production systems. While the understanding and incorporation of tritrophic interactions in pest control offers a promising control option, the sustainable biological control of pests requires a dynamic approach that involves diversity in all of the species present, richness in natural enemies, and limited adverse activity (i.e., minimal pesticide use). This approach is especially important in conservation biological control efforts.

There are typically more than three trophic levels at play in a given production setting, so the tritrophic interaction model may represent an oversimplification. Furthermore, ecological complexity and interactions between species of the same trophic level can come into play. Research thus far has had a relatively narrow focus, which may be suitable for controlled environments such as greenhouses but which has not yet addressed multi-generational plant interactions with dynamic communities of organisms.
