= Secondary metabolism =

Non-essential metabolic pathways and compounds

Streptomycin, an important antibiotic drug produced by Streptomyces bacteria

In biochemistry, secondary metabolism (also called specialized metabolism) is a term for pathways and small molecule products of metabolism that are involved in ecological interactions, but are not absolutely required for the survival of the organism. These molecules are sometimes produced by specialized cells, such as laticifers in plants. Secondary metabolites commonly mediate antagonistic interactions, such as competition and predation, as well as mutualistic ones such as pollination and resource mutualisms. Examples of secondary metabolites include antibiotics, pigments and scents. The opposite of secondary metabolites are primary metabolites, which are considered to be essential to the normal growth or development of an organism.

Secondary metabolites are produced by many microbes, plants, fungi and animals, usually living in crowded habitats, where chemical defense represents a better option than physical escape. It is very hard to distinguish primary and secondary metabolites due to often overlapping of the intermediates and pathways of primary and secondary metabolism. One such example is that of sterols, which are products of secondary metabolism, and, at the same time, represent a base for a cell structure.

== Important secondary metabolites ==
- Antibiotics, such as streptomycin and penicillin
- Pigments, such as delphinidin
- Scents, such as ionone

== See also ==
- Plant secondary metabolism
- Phytochemistry
- Ophiocordyceps unilateralis
