= Tropical (disambiguation) =

"Tropical" refers to the tropics, regions of Earth surrounding the Equator.

Tropical may also refer to:

== Music ==
- Tropical music, music genres deriving from Spanish-speaking areas of the Caribbean
- Tropical (EP), by Shit and Shine, 2014
- Tropical, an album by J. T. Meirelles, 1969
- Tropical, an album by Jorge Ben, 1977
- Tropical, an album by Pompeya, 2011
- "Tropical", a song by Inna from Nirvana, 2017
- "Tropical", a song by SL, 2018
- "Tropical", a song by Jul from C'est quand qu'il s'éteint, 2023

== Television stations ==
- CNT Tropical, a television station in Londrina, Paraná, Brazil
- Tropical Television, the brand name of STQ, a television station in Queensland, Australia during its phase as MVQ
- TV Tropical, a television station in Natal, Rio Grande do Norte, Brazil

== Other uses ==
- Tropical (vehicles), a Greek motor vehicle manufacturer
- Tropical Air, a Tanzanian airline
- Tropical Airways, a defunct Haitian airline
- Tropical geometry, a mathematical area studying geometry over the tropical semiring

== See also ==
- MS Tropicale, a cruise ship 1982–2021
- Tropic (disambiguation), including uses of Tropics
