= Tropic (disambiguation) =

The term tropic refers to the tropics, a region of the Earth surrounding the Equator.

Tropic or Tropics may also refer to:

== Places and geography ==
- Tropic of Cancer
- Tropic of Capricorn
- Tropic, Florida, a town in the United States
- Tropic, Utah, a town in the United States

== Sports ==
- Miami Tropics (American football), a professional football team
- Miami Tropics, a team in the Premier Basketball League
- TSV Oberhaching Tropics, a German basketball team
- West Palm Beach Tropics, Senior Professional Baseball Association

== Other uses ==
- SS Tropic (1871)
- SS Tropic (1904), see List of White Star Line ships
- Tropic (Josep Renau), a 1945 painting by Spanish artist Josep Renau
- Tropic (magazine), a Sunday magazine published as an insert to the Miami Herald
- Time-Resolved Observations of Precipitation structure and storm Intensity with a Constellation of Smallsats (TROPICS), a NASA spacecraft mission
- Tropic Skincare, a British cosmetic products marketing company

== See also ==
- Trophic (disambiguation)
- Tropical (disambiguation)
