= Trophic species =

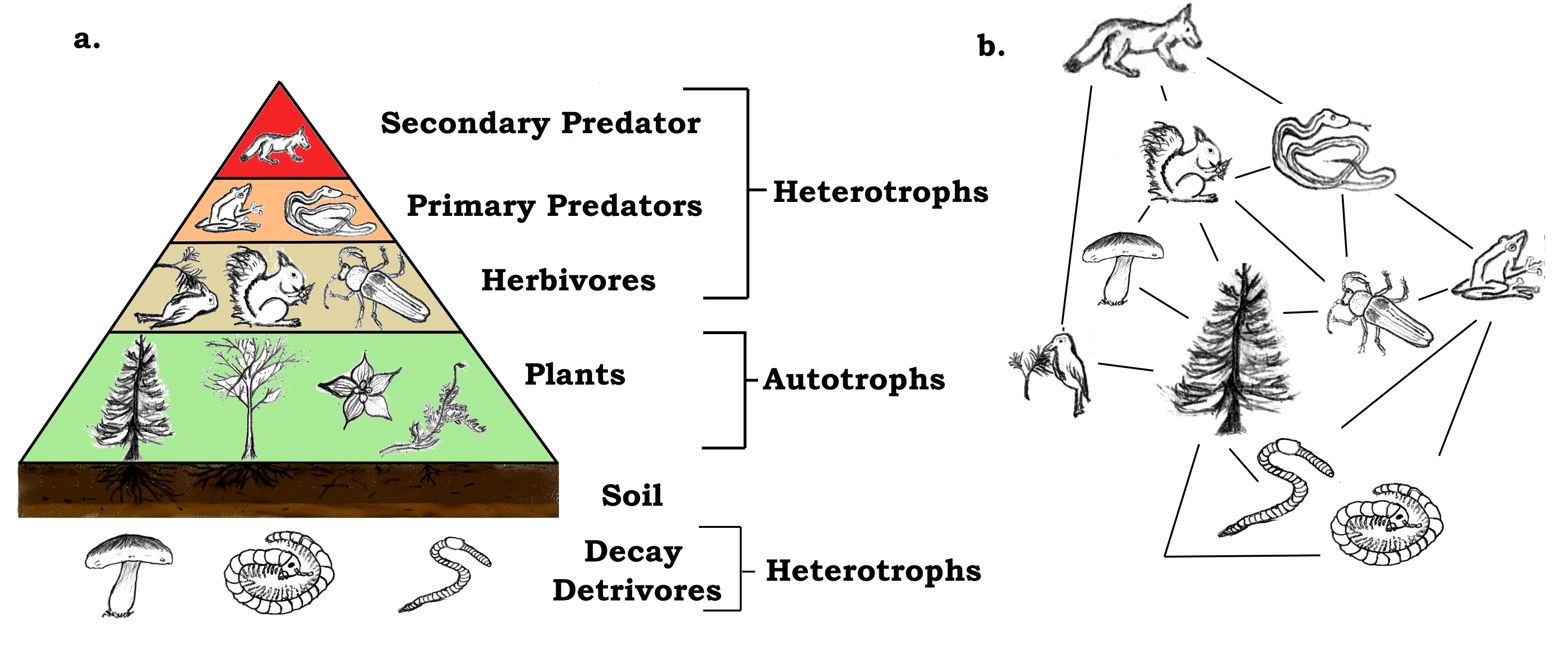
Species are grouped trophically on the left, however distinctions such as herbivore and predator are merely the simplest definitions.

Trophic species are a scientific grouping of organisms according to their shared trophic (feeding) positions in a food web or food chain. Trophic species have identical prey and a shared set of predators in the food web. This means that members of a trophic species share many of the same kinds of ecological functions. The idea of trophic species was first devised by Frederic Briand and Joel Cohen in 1984 when investigating scaling laws applying to food webs. The category may include species of plants, animals, a combination of plants and animals, and biological stages of an organism. When assigning groups in a trophic manner, relationships are linear in scale, which allows the same authors to predict the proportion of different trophic links in food webs. Furthermore grouping similar species according to feeding habit rather than genetics results in a ratio of predator to prey that is generally 1:1 in food webs.
