= Trophic function =

Mathematical function describing predator consumption of prey

A trophic function was first introduced in the differential equations of the Kolmogorov predator–prey model. It generalizes the linear case of predator–prey interaction firstly described by Volterra and Lotka in the Lotka–Volterra equation. A trophic function represents the consumption of prey assuming a given number of predators. The trophic function (also referred to as the functional response) was widely applied in chemical kinetics, biophysics, mathematical physics and economics. In economics, "predator" and "prey" become various economic parameters such as prices and outputs of goods in various linked sectors such as processing and supply. These relationships, in turn, were found to behave similarly to the magnitudes in chemical kinetics, where the molecular analogues of predators and prey react chemically with each other.

These inter-disciplinary findings suggest the universal character of trophic functions and the predator–prey models in which they appear. They give general principles for the dynamic interactions of objects of different natures, so that the mathematical models worked out in one science may be applied to another. Trophic functions have proven useful in forecasting temporarily stable conditions (limit cycles and/or attractors) of the coupled dynamics of predator and prey. L.S. Pontryagin's theorem on the inflection points of trophic functions guarantees the existence of a limit cycle in these systems.

Trophic functions are especially important in situations of chaos, when one has numerous interacting magnitudes and objects, as is particularly true in global economics. To define and forecast the dynamics in this case is scarcely possible with linear methods, but non-linear dynamic analysis involving trophic functions leads to the discovery of limit cycles or attractors. Since in nature there exist only temporarily stable objects, such limit cycles and attractors must exist in the dynamics of observed natural objects (chemistry, flora and fauna, economics, cosmology). The general theory suggests as-yet-unknown regularities in the dynamics of the various systems surrounding us.

Despite the success already achieved in research on trophic functions, the field still has great further theoretical potential and practical importance. Global economics, for instance, needs tools to forecast the dynamics of outputs and prices over a scale of at least 3–5 years, to maintain stable demand, not over-produce, and prevent crises such as that of 2008.
