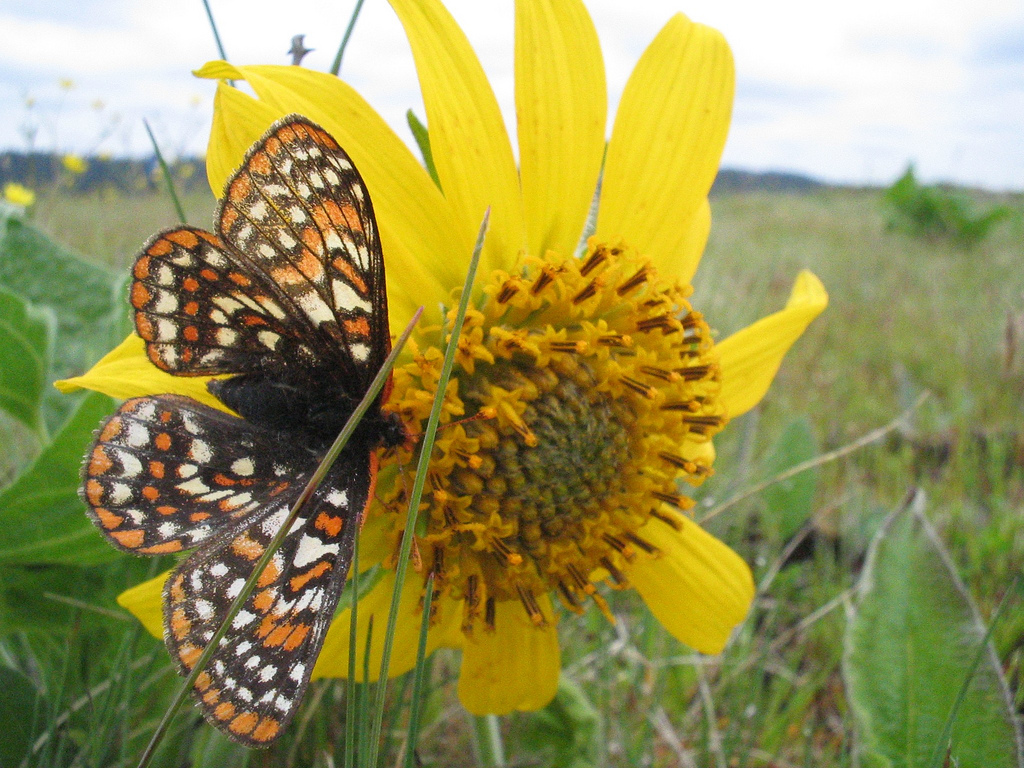

Conservation status
- Endangered (ESA)

Scientific classification
- Kingdom: Animalia
- Phylum: Arthropoda
- Clade: Pancrustacea
- Class: Insecta
- Order: Lepidoptera
- Family: Nymphalidae
- Genus: Euphydryas
- Species: E. editha
- Subspecies: E. e. taylori

Trinomial name
- Euphydryas editha taylori (W.H. Edwards, 1888)

= Euphydryas editha taylori =

Subspecies of butterfly

Euphydryas editha taylori, the Whulge checkerspot or Taylor's checkerspot, is a butterfly native to an area of the northwestern United States and Vancouver Island.

== Description ==
Taylor's checkerspot is the darkest subspecies of the genus Euphydryas. It is a subspecies of Edith's checkerspot. This butterfly has a wingspan of less than 2.25 inches (57 mm). It gets its name from the checkered color pattern on its wings that consist of black, orange and white coloring. Taylor's checkerspot once ranged from the Willamette Valley in Oregon to Vancouver Island in British Columbia.

=== Chemical ecology ===
Taylor's checkerspot larvae rely on complex multitrophic interactions for survival. The larvae feed upon certain plant species in the native Castilleja and exotic Plantago genera that produce defensive compounds called iridoid glycosides. Over time, the Taylor's checkerspot has developed a tolerance for these compounds, such that the larvae are able to consume the foliage of these plants and sequester the compounds in their own tissues. These compounds then confer chemical protection against bird predators to the larvae.

== Conservation status ==
The Taylor's checkerspot butterfly is at extreme risk of going extinct. It was listed as endangered under the U.S. Endangered Species Act in 2013. In 2006, it was listed as state-endangered in Washington, where an active conservation program is underway. In Oregon Taylor's checkerspot is on the Threatened and Endangered Species list, but receives no protection under state statute. Before its dramatic decline Taylor's checkerspot was documented at more than seventy sites, but is currently found only at ten sites in Washington and two in Oregon. It is currently listed as endangered in Canada, owing to the recent discovery of populations on Denman Island.

=== Threats ===
The biggest threat to its survival is the loss of prairie habitat due to contemporary settlement. More than 99% of the lowland prairies has been destroyed. The reason for this is that prairies are prime locations for agriculture as well as development of all types due to the lack of trees and flat topography. Along with habitat loss the subspecies is impacted by pesticide use that makes their plight even worse. Increased risk of harm due to drought is another major concern since they are now stuck on these patches of habitat with no chance to migrate to more suitable places.

== Image gallery ==
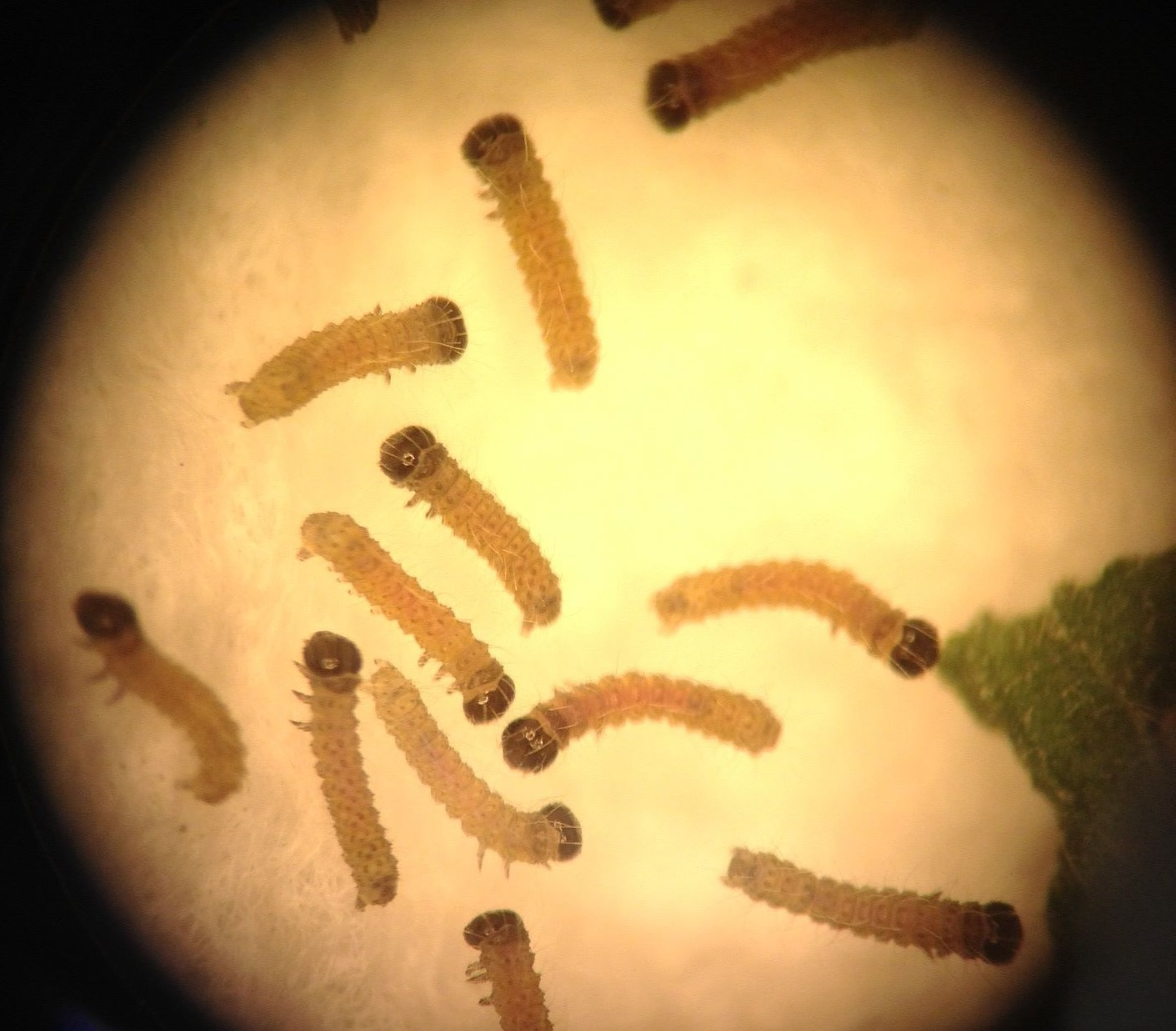
Early instar Euphydryas editha taylori larvae viewed under a dissection scope for observation

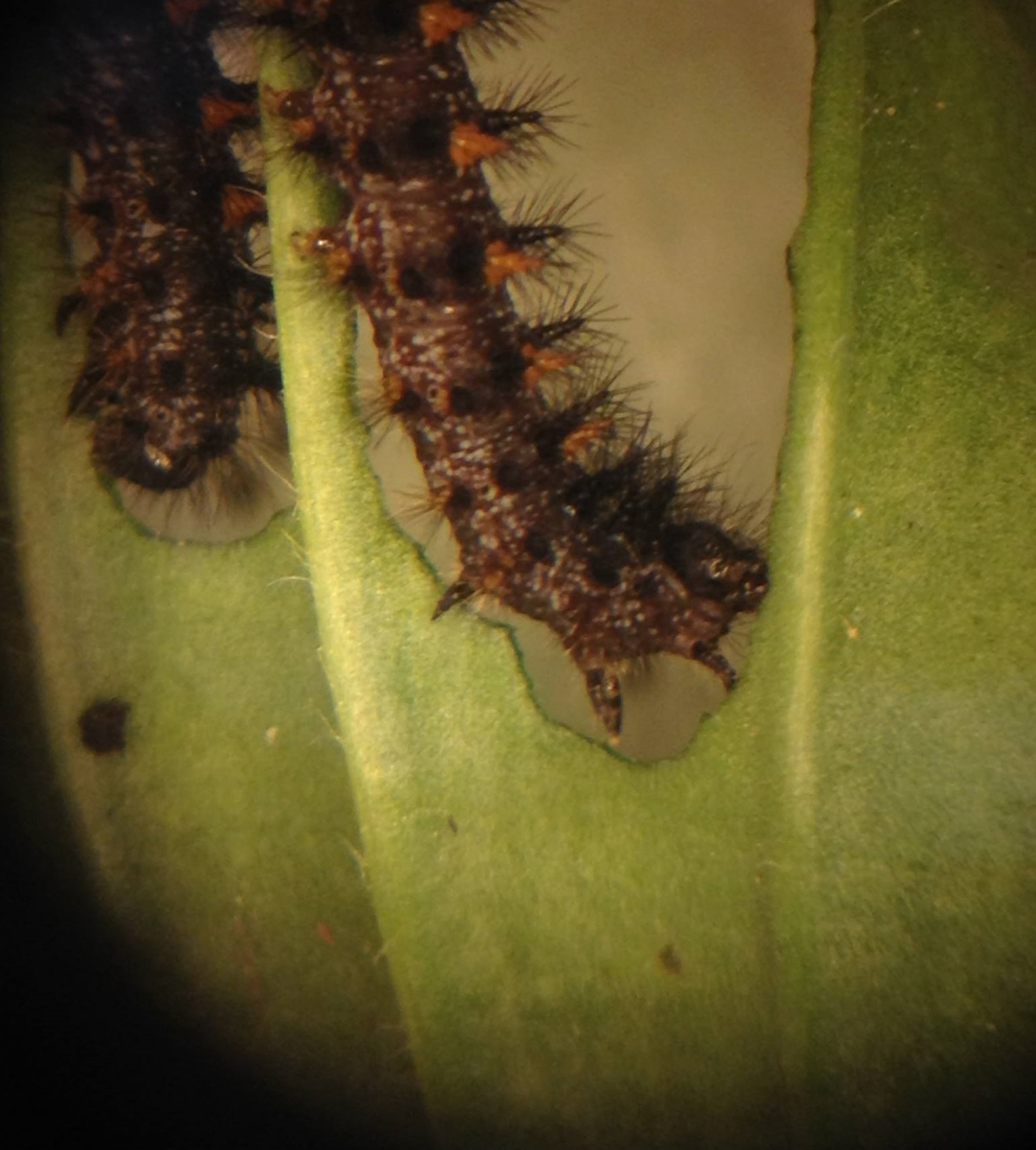
Late instar Euphydryas editha taylori larva eating a Plantago lanceolata leaf, from which it sequesters defensive compounds known as iridoid glycosides.

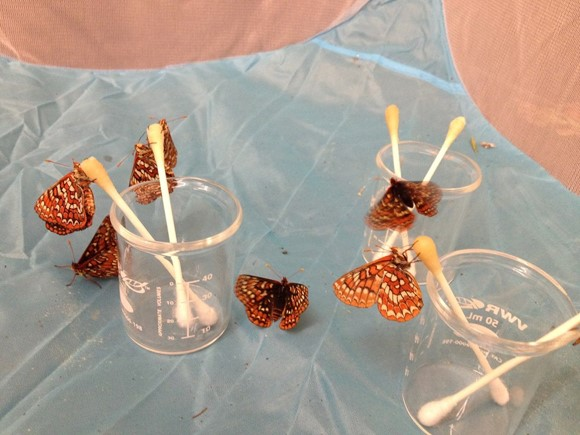
Lab-reared Euphydryas editha taylori feeding on honey water at the University of Washington Terrestrial Restoration Ecology lab
