= Trophic mutualism =

Type of ecological mutualism

Trophic mutualism is a key type of ecological mutualism. Specifically, "trophic mutualism" refers to the transfer of energy and nutrients between two species. This is also sometimes known as resource-to-resource mutualism. Trophic mutualism often occurs between an autotroph and a heterotroph. Although there are many examples of trophic mutualisms, the heterotroph is generally a fungus or bacteria. This mutualism can be both obligate and opportunistic.

== Examples ==
- Rhizobia – Rhizobia are bacteria that conduct nitrogen fixation for legume plants. Specifically, these bacteria can be from genera Allorhizobium, Azorhizobium, Bradyrhizobium, Mesorhizobium, Rhizobium, or Sinorhizobium. In this mutualistic relationship, the bacteria grow on or within the root hair and penetrate into the plant tissues Although the exact means of interaction between the Rhizobia and plant varies with genus and species, all forms of this interaction are made up of the infection of bacteria, bacteria colonization, control of O_{2}, and exchange of carbon and nitrogen. The role that rhizobia play in fixing nitrogen for legumes is the basis for why legumes can be used in crop rotation.
- Mycorrhizae – Mycorrhizae are similar to rhizobia in that they interact with plants at their roots. Whereas rhizobia are bacteria that fix nitrogen, mycorrhizae are fungi that bring nutrients to the plants in return for carbon. Mycorrhizas are also capable of improving water uptake and communicating to their hosts to resist to pathogens. Three main types of mycorrhizae exist:

1. Arbuscula: found in non-woody and tropical plants
2. Ectomycorrhiza: found in boreal and temperate forests
3. Ericoid: found in species of the heathland.

- Digestive symbiotes – Digestive symbiotes are an example of an important trophic mutualism that does not occur between an autotroph and heterotroph. Bacteria known as "extracellular symbionts" live within the gastrointestinal tracts of vertebrates, where they aid in the digestion of food. The bacteria benefits by extracting substrates from the eaten food, while the animal’s assimilation is increased by being able to digest certain foods that its natural system cannot. (book) In addition, these bacteria create short-chain fatty acids (SCFA), providing the vertebrate with energy totaling up to anywhere from 29%-79% of the vertebrate’s maintenance energy depending on the species.

== History of research ==
Ecologists first began to understand trophic mutualisms in the mid-20th century with the investigation of nutrient abundance and distribution. One of the first trophic mutualisms was discovered in 1958 by Professor Leonard Muscatine of UCLA, the relationship between endozoic algae and coral. In this relationship, the algae provides the coral with a Carbon source to develop its CaCO_{3} skeleton and the coral secretes a protecting nutrient-rich mucus which benefits the algae. Perhaps one of the most famous discoveries made by Muscatine in the field of trophic mutualism came about 10 years later in another aquatic based system-the relationship between algae and water hydra. This work was significant in establishing the presence of mutualistic relationships in both aquatic and terrestrial environments.

Perhaps the most widely acclaimed example of a trophic mutualism was the discovery of the leafcutter ant that engage in trophic mutualism with a fungus. These ants cultivate a certain type of fungus by providing it with leaves and other nutrients. In turn, the ants will feed on a special nutrient that is only created by the fungus they nurture. This trophic mutualism was studied in detail in the 1970s and since.

== See also ==
- Ecology
- Mutualism (biology)
- Symbiosis
