= List of Portuguese flags =

This is a list of flags used in Portugal.

== National flag ==
| Flag | Date | Use | Description |
|---|---|---|---|
| | 30 June 1911 – present | National flag and ensign | A green and red rectangle with the national coat of arms (an armillary sphere and a Portuguese shield). |

== Autonomous regions ==
| Flag | Date | Use | Description |
|---|---|---|---|
| | 1979–present | Flag of the Autonomous Region of the Azores. | This flag is similar to the flag of Portugal used between 1830 and 1910, except that the Portuguese coat of arms has been replaced by nine five-sided stars in a semi-circular arch over a stylized golden goshawk (in Portuguese: Açor), the symbol of the Azores, positioned over the border of the two bands. |
| | 1978–present | Flag of the Autonomous Region of Madeira. | A blue-gold-blue vertical triband with a red-bordered white Cross of Christ in the center. |

== Government flags ==
| Flag | Date | Use | Description |
|---|---|---|---|
| | 1911–present | Flag of the president of the Republic | A green rectangle with the national coat of arms. |
| | 2006–present | Flag of the Assembly of the Republic | A white rectangle (ratio 2:3) with a centrally positioned minor coat of arms and a green border. |
| | 1972–present | Flag of the prime minister | This flag is like the flag of the president, but is white with a green saltire with the Arms (sphere and shield) at the centre. There is a red border on all four sides with a pattern of laurel leaves in gold. This replaces the former flag of the Minister of defence. |
| | 1911–present | Minister flag | Same flag as the prime minister, but without the red border. |
| | 1952–present | Flag of the defence minister | The only flag not to follow the style of the national flag. |

== Military flags ==
| Flag | Date | Use | Description |
|---|---|---|---|
| | 30 June 1911 – present | Regimental colours of the units of the Portuguese Armed Forces | Equally divided in green and red with the national coat of arms enclosed by two yellow laurel shoots intersecting at their stems and bound by a white scroll bearing Camões's verse "Esta é a ditosa pátria minha amada" (English: "This is my beloved fortunate homeland") as the motto. Naval units have additional Order of Christ Cross in the canton. |
| | 30 June 1911 – present | Naval jack of Portugal | A square with a green-bordered red field charged with the national coat of arms on the center. |

=== Army staff ===
| Flag | Date | Use | Description |
|---|---|---|---|
| | | Marshal of the Portuguese army | Four gold stars set as a square on a square banner |
| | | General of the Portuguese army | Four silver stars set as a square on a square banner |
| | | Lieutenant general of the Portuguese army | Three silver stars set as a triangle on a square banner |
| | | Major general of the Portuguese army | Two silver stars side-by-side on a square banner |

=== Navy staff ===
| Flag | Date | Use | Description |
|---|---|---|---|
| | | Commander-in-chief of the Portuguese navy | Rectangular white field quartered by a green cross, the cross of Christ in the canton. |
| | | Fleet-admiral of the Portuguese navy | Rectangular white field quartered by a green cross, the minor coat of arms of Portugal in the canton. |
| | | Admiral of the Portuguese navy | Rectangular white field quartered by a green cross. |
| | | Vice admiral of the Portuguese navy | Rectangular white field quartered by a green cross, a red circle in the canton. |
| | | Rear admiral of the Portuguese navy | Rectangular white field quartered by a green cross, a red circle in the canton and another in the lower hoist. |

== Historical flags ==
=== County of Portugal ===
| Flag | Date | Use | Description |
|---|---|---|---|
| | 1095–1143 | Royal flag | Heraldic banner (a blue cross on a white (or silver) field (hypothetical – hypothesis proposed as early as the 16th century)) |

=== Kingdom of Portugal ===
| Flag | Date | Use | Description |
|---|---|---|---|
| | 1143–1185 | Royal flag | Heraldic banner (a blue cross with five blue escutcheons each charged with an undetermined number of bezants on a white field (hypothetical)). |
| | 1185–1248 | Royal flag | Heraldic banner (five blue escutcheons each charged with an undetermined number of bezants on a white field (first standard and historic royal coat of arms)). |
| | 1248–1385 | Royal flag | Heraldic banner (Five blue escutcheons each charged with an undetermined number of bezants on a white field. Border: red with yellow castles (number not fixed)). |
| | 1385–1485 | Royal flag | Heraldic banner (Five blue escutcheons each charged with an undetermined number of bezants on a white field. Border: red with yellow castles and a green cross of the Order of Aviz). |
| | 1485–1521 | Royal flag | Heraldic banner (Five blue escutcheons each charged with five bezants on a white field. Border: red with eight yellow castles). |
| | 1495–1521 | Alternative royal flag | White with the coat of arms of the Kingdom in the middle |
| | 1521–1578 | Royal flag | White with the coat of arms of the Kingdom in the middle |
| | 1578–1640 | Royal flag | White with the coat of arms of the Kingdom in the middle |
| | 1616–1640 | Alternative royal flag | White with the coat of arms of the Kingdom in the middle (variant with branches of brambles under the shield) |
| | 1640–1667 | Royal flag | White with the coat of arms of the Kingdom in the middle |
| | 1667–1706 | Royal flag (used only in fortresses and warships of the Crown) | White with the coat of arms of the Kingdom in the middle |
| | 1706–1816 | Royal flag until the late 18th century (used only in fortresses and warships of the Crown) and national flag from then on | White with the coat of arms of the Kingdom in the middle |
| | 1750–1816 | Variant of the royal flag until the late 18th century (used only in fortresses and warships of the Crown) and national flag from then on | White with the coat of arms of the Kingdom in the middle (variant with a heraldic console encircling the shield) |
| | 1816–1826 | National flag | White with the coat of arms of the Kingdom in the middle (coat of arms of the United Kingdom of Portugal, Brazil and the Algarves) |
| | 1826–1834 | National flag (used by the Miguelist faction in the Liberal Wars). | White with the coat of arms of the Kingdom in the middle |
| | 1834–1910 | National flag | Vertical bicolour blue-white. Proportion of the fields: 1:1. |

=== Kingdom of Algarve ===
| Flag | Date | Use | Description |
|---|---|---|---|
| | 1189–1191 | Putative flag | White with the coat of arms of the Kingdom in the middle |
| | 1248–1910 | Putative flag | White with the coat of arms of the Kingdom in the middle |

=== Portuguese Macau ===
| Flag | Date | Use | Description |
|---|---|---|---|
| | 1975–1999 | Flag of the Government of Macau. During the Portuguese administration this flag also represented the Territory of Macau in the international forums, although it was not the official flag of the Portuguese territory. | A light blue field charged with the coat of arms of Government of Macau. |
| | | Flag of the Municipality of Macau, one of two local municipal governments and in the sports events | This was the flag used at the handover to China in 1999. A light blue field charged with the coat of arms of Municipality of Macau. |
| | | Flag of the Municipality of Macau, one of two local municipal governments and in the sports events | Dark blue version. |
| | | Flag of the Municipality of Ilhas, one of two local municipal governments | An orange filed charged with the coat of arms of Municipality of Ilhas. |

=== Military Flags ===
| Flag | Date | Use | Description |
|---|---|---|---|
| | 14th–15th century | Flag of Saint George | A white field charged with a red cross. |
| | 14th century | Flag of the Order of Aviz | White field charged with a green fleur-de-lis cross. |
| | 16th century–17th century | Flag of the Order of Christ | White field charged with the Cross of the Order of Christ. |
| | 16th century | Variant of the flag of the Order of Christ used during the Discovery Age | Green and white gyronny charged with the Cross of the Order of Christ. |
| | 17th century | Variant of the flag of the Order of Christ used during the Portuguese Restoration War | Green field charged with the Cross of the Order of Christ. |
| | 18th century | Military flag used during the War of the Spanish Succession | Nine horizontal stripes consisting of red, white, and blue. |
| | 19th century | 1853 Portuguese army regimental flag | White field charged with the Portuguese coat of arms, a ribbon with unit name, and royal monogram. |
| | 19th century | 1868 Portuguese army regimental flag | Vertical white and blue field charged with the Portuguese coat of arms, a ribbon with unit name, and royal monogram. |

=== Merchant marine flags ===
| Flag | Date | Use | Description |
|---|---|---|---|
| | 15th–16th century | Merchant flag | White quincunx on a square blue field. |
| | 17th–18th century | Portuguese Brazil coaster flag for ships with less than 15 pieces of artillery | Seven horizontal stripes, alternating green and white. |
| | 17th century | Merchant flag | White field with the Cross of the Order of Christ off-center to the hoist side. |
| | 18th century | Portuguese India merchant flag | White field charged with a red or purple armillary sphere with three crosses, off center to the hoist side. |
| | 18th century | Portuguese Brazil merchant flag | White field charged with a golden armillary sphere, off center to the hoist side. |
| | 18th century | Portuguese Brazil merchant flag, used by merchants involved in the Missions region. | White field charged with the Portuguese coat of arms, a red armillary sphere and a missionary. |
| | 18th century | Merchant flag, used by merchants of the city of Porto | Six horizontal green stripes and five white stripes. |
| | 18th century | Common merchant flag. | Rectangular flag charged with 17 red, blue, and white successions of stripes, quartered by a black cross, a white cross in the canton. |

=== Navy flags ===
| Flag | Date | Use | Description |
|---|---|---|---|
| | 16th century | General use | Square white field charged with the Cross of Christ |
| | 1616–1640 | Used at sea during the Iberian Union, flown in the stern section of the ship | Rectangular white field charged with the arms of Portugal on branches, offset to the hoist side. |
| | 1640–1667 | Used at sea, flown in the stern section of the ship. | Rectangular white field charged with the arms of Portugal, offset to the hoist side. |
| | 17th century | Portuguese India-based fleets, flown in the stern section. | Backside of the royal flag. Rectangular white flag with Our Lady offset to the hoist side. |
| | 17th–18th century | Commander of Portuguese-Brasil-based warships | Rectangular green and white striped field charged with the coat of arms of Portugal. |
| | –1670 | Commander of Portuguese-India-based warships, flown in the stern section | Rectangular white field charged with the royal coat of arms of Portugal set on a Cross of Christ, offset to the hoist side. |
| | 1600 | War ensign | |
| | 1706–1750 | Royal navy flag flown in the stern section. | Rectangular white field charged with the arms of Portugal, offset to the hoist side. |
| | 1826–1830 | Royal navy flag flown in the stern section. | Rectangular white field charged with the arms of Portugal, offset to the hoist side. |
| | 1816–1826 | Royal navy flag flown in the stern section. | Rectangular white field charged with the arms of the United Kingdom of Portugal, Brazil and Algarves offset to the hoist side. |
| | 1834–1910 | Variant of the national flag for use at sea (ensign) | Vertical bicolour blue-white. Proportion of the fields: 1:2. |
| | 1833–1910 | Royal navy jack, flown in the bow section | Square white banner charged with the royal coat of arms of Portugal, a blue bordure. |
| | 1828–1910 | Personal royal jack used at sea in the bow section | Square white banner charged with the royal coat of arms of Portugal, a red bordure. |
| | 1707–1910 | Personal royal banner used at sea in the stern section | Rectangular red field charged with the royal arms of Portugal offset to the hoist side. |

=== Royal banners ===
| Flag | Date | Use | Description |
|---|---|---|---|
| | 1495–1521 | Used in the presence of the monarch. | Golden armillary sphere on a square red and white field. |
| | 1551–1568 | Used in the presence of the monarch. | Royal Portuguese coat of arms on a rectangular red field. |
| | 1540–1656 | Used in the presence of the monarch. | Royal Portuguese coat of arms on a rectangular blue field. |
| | 1683–1706 | Used in the presence of the monarch. | Royal Portuguese coat of arms on a rectangular green field. |
| | 1706–1910 | Used in the presence of the monarch. | Royal Portuguese coat of arms on a rectangular red field. |
| | 1826 | Used in the presence of the monarch. | Rectangular armorial banner. |
| | 1853–1861 | Used in the presence of the monarch. | Royal Portuguese coat of arms on a rectangular red field. |
| | 1853–1861 | Used in the presence of the monarch. (alternative) | Royal Portuguese coat of arms on a rectangular red field, the royal monogram in each corner. |

==== Other banners of the royal family ====
| Flag | Date | Use | Description |
|---|---|---|---|
| | 1653–1908 | Prince of Beira | Banner of arms of Portugal defaced with a label with three points, each point attached by a flower. |

=== Governmental flags ===
| Flag | Date | Use | Description |
|---|---|---|---|
| | 1911–1974 | Flag of the navy minister | White flag with a green cross of Saint George, with the Arms in the centre. As the position of "Minister of the Navy" has been abolished, the flag is currently not used. |
| | 1911–1974 | Flag of the war/army minister | Flag divided vertically like that of the Army, but with five white stars over all, arranged in a ring. As the position of "Minister of the War/Army" has been abolished, the flag is currently not used. |
| | 1911–2011 | Flag of the civil governors | De facto not in use since 2011. |
| | 1952 - 1972 | Flag of the Portuguese President of the Council of Ministers. | Square flag. |

=== Chartered trading company flags ===
| Flag | Date | Company | Description |
|---|---|---|---|
| | 1443–1503 | Casa da Guiné | |
| | c. 1756 | General Company of Commerce Pernambuco i Paraíba^{pt} | |
| | c. 1756 | Grão Pará and Maranhão Company | |
| | 1922–1974 | Companhia Colonial de Navegação | |

=== Colonial authorities flag ===
| Flag | Date | Use | Description |
|---|---|---|---|
| | 1911–1933 | Portuguese high commissioner | |
| | 1911–1933 | Portuguese district governor | |
| | 1933–1975 | Portuguese governor-general | |
| | 1933–1999 | Portuguese governor | |
| | 1933–1975 | Governor of province (1933–1951) | |
| | 1933–1975 | Governor of district (1951–1975) | |
| | 1933–1951 | Portuguese district intendant | |
| | 1933–1951 | Portuguese officer | |

== Proposed flags ==
=== Overseas provinces ===
| Flag | Date | Use | Description |
|---|---|---|---|
| | 1965 | Proposed flag for Portuguese Angola | Portuguese national flag with the coat of arms of Portuguese Angola in the lower fly corner. |
| | 1965 | Proposed flag for Portuguese Cape Verde | Portuguese national flag with the coat of arms of Portuguese Cape Verde in the lower fly corner. |
| | 1965 | Proposed flag for Portuguese Guinea | Portuguese national flag with the coat of arms of Portuguese Guinea in the lower fly corner. |
| | 1965 | Proposed flag for Portuguese India | Portuguese national flag with the coat of arms of Portuguese India in the lower fly corner. |
| | 1965 | Proposed flag for Portuguese Macau | Portuguese national flag with the coat of arms of Portuguese Macau in the lower fly corner. |
| | 1965 | Proposed flag for Portuguese Mozambique | Portuguese national flag with the coat of arms of Portuguese Mozambique in the lower fly corner. |
| | 1965 | Proposed flag for Portuguese São Tomé and Príncipe | Portuguese national flag with the coat of arms of Portuguese São Tomé and Príncipe in the lower fly corner. |
| | 1965 | Proposed flag for Portuguese Timor | Portuguese national flag with the coat of arms of Portuguese Timor in the lower fly corner. |

=== Colonies ===
| Flag | Date | Use | Description |
|---|---|---|---|
| | 1932 | Proposed flag for Portuguese Angola | |
| | 1932 | Proposed flag for Portuguese Cape Verde | |
| | 1932 | Proposed flag for Portuguese Guinea | |
| | 1932 | Proposed flag for Portuguese India | |
| | 1932 | Proposed flag for Portuguese Macau | |
| | 1932 | Proposed flag for Portuguese Mozambique | |
| | 1932 | Proposed flag for Portuguese São Tomé and Príncipe | |
| | 1932 | Proposed flag for Portuguese Timor | |

== Capitals of former overseas territories ==
| Flag | Date | Use | Description |
|---|---|---|---|
| | –1964 | City of Luanda | Coat of arms of Luanda on a rectangular purple field |
| | 1964–1975 | Second flag of Portuguese Luanda | Coat of arms of Luanda on a rectangular purple and yellow gyronny |
| | 1952–1975 | City of Dili | Coat of arms of Dili on a rectangular green and white gyronny. |
| | 1952–1975 | City of Dili (square version) | Coat of arms of Dili on a square green and white gyronny. |
| | –1962 | City of Goa | Coat of arms of Goa on a red and white rectangular gyronny |
| | 1962–1965 | City of Goa | Coat of arms of Goa on a white field. |
| | –1975 | City of Bissau. | Rectangular red and black gyronny charged with the coat of arms of Bissau. |
| | –1975 | City of Bissau (square version) | Square red and black gyronny charged with the coat of arms of Bissau. |
| | –1975 | City of Praia | Rectangular white and blue gyronny charged with the coat of arms of Praia. |
| | –1975 | City of São Tomé | Rectangular white and blue gyronny charged with the coat of arms of São Tomé. |
| | –1962 | City of Lourenço Marques (square version) | Square green field charged with the arms of Lourenço Marques. |
| | 1962–1975 | City of Lourenço Marques (square version) | Square yellow and green gyronny charged with the arms of Lourenço Marques. |

== Political flags ==
| Flag | Date | Party | Description |
|---|---|---|---|
| | 1974–present | Socialist Party | |
| | 2019–present | Chega | |
| | 1974–present | Social Democratic Party | |
| | 2024–present | Democratic Alliance | |
| | 2017–present | Liberal Initiative | |
| | 1999–present | Left Bloc | |
| | 1974–present | Portuguese Communist Party | |
| | 1974–present | CDS – People's Party | |
| | 1983–present | Ecologist Party "The Greens" | |
| | 2014–present | LIVRE | |
| | 1970–present | Portuguese Workers' Communist Party | |
| | 2019–present | React, Include, Recycle | |
| | 1974–present | People's Monarchist Party | |
| | 2009–present | Portuguese Labour Party | |
former
| | 1974–1983 | Worker–Peasant Alliance | |
| | 1981–1992 | Communist Party (Reconstructed) | |
| | 1980–1982 | Republican and Socialist Front | |
| | 1979–1983 | Democratic Alliance | |
| | 1978–1999 | Revolutionary Socialist Party | |
| | 1974–1981 | Movement of Socialist Left | |
| | 1974–2005 | Popular Democratic Union | |
| | 1974–1988 | Portuguese Marxist–Leninist Communist Organization | |
| | 1973–1976 | Revolutionary Party of the Proletariat – Revolutionary Brigades | |
| | 1969–1994 | Portuguese Democratic Movement | |
| | 1936–1974 | Mocidade Portuguesa | |
| | 1932–1934 | National Syndicalists | |
| | 1930–1974 | National Union | |
| | 1876–1912 | Portuguese Republican Party | |
other
| | 1975 | Azores Liberation Front | |
| | 1975–1978 | Madeira Archipelago Liberation Front | |

== See also ==
- A Portuguesa
- Coat of arms of Portugal
- List of personal standards of the Kings of Portugal
- List of Portuguese municipal flags
- List of Macanese flags
- Portuguese vexillology
