= List of personal standards of the kings of Portugal =

This is a list of personal standards of the kings of Portugal.

Flag	Description	Century
	King Manuel I personal standard	16th century
	King Manuel I (alternative) personal standard	16th century
	King Sebastian personal standard used during the Battle of Alcácer Quibir	16th century
	King John IV personal standard (first monarch of the House of Braganza)	17th century
	King Peter II personal standard	17th century
	King John V personal standard with the Order of Christ grand collar	18th century
	Personal standard of the kings of Portugal, from King John V on	18th century to 20th century
	King Pedro IV personal standard (aka Emperor Peter I of Brazil)	19th century
	Royal Standard variant used by King Peter V	19th century
	Royal Standard variant used by King Peter V (with royal cypher)	19th century

== See also ==
- Flag of Portugal
- Portuguese vexillology
