= Flag of Lisbon =

Municipal flag

Municipal flag of Lisbon
- Flag of Saint Vincent
- Proportion: 2∶3
- Adopted: 28 February 1940; 86 years ago
- Design: A gyronny alternating between black and white defaced with the coat of arms of Lisbon in the center.
- Designed by: João Ricardo Silva; Afonso de Dornelas
- Banner
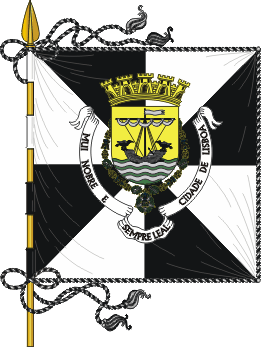
- Proportion: 1:1

The municipal flag of Lisbon, also known as the flag of Saint Vincent, is the municipal flag of Lisbon, consisting of a gyronny alternating between black and white defaced with the coat of arms of Lisbon in the center. For civil use the flag is flown without the coat of arms.

The coat of arms of Lisbon depict the story of how Saint Vincent came to become the patron saint of Lisbon. Portuguese legend states how the body of the saint was bought to the Algarve in 1173 whilst on its way to the capital to be interred at Lisbon Cathedral by King Afonso I. Here, whilst the ship was moored at Portugal's most south-westerly point (modern day Cape St. Vincent) two ravens allegedly perched on the ship to keep guard of the corpse. This legend made its way into Portuguese folklore, resulting in the scene being used to represent Lisbon.

Draped immediately below is the collar of the Order of the Tower and Sword, which was awarded to the city on 3 June 1920 by President António José de Almeida. Beneath the coat of arms there is a white scroll bearing the motto MUI NOBRE E SEMPRE LEAL CIDADE DE LISBOA ("VERY NOBLE AND EVER LOYAL CITY OF LISBON"). Above the coat of arms there is a golden mural crown with five visible towers, indicating Lisbon's capital city status.

The Flag of Lisbon influenced the design of the Flag of Ceuta.

== See also ==
- Portuguese vexillology
- List of Portuguese municipal flags
- Coat of arms of Lisbon
- Flag of Ceuta
