= Flag of Portugal =

Portuguese Republic
- Other names: Bandeira das Quinas ('Flag of the Fives'), Bandeira Verde-Rubra ('Green-Red Flag')
- Use: National flag and ensign
- Proportion: 2:3
- Adopted: 30 June 1911; 115 years ago
- Design: A 2:3 vertically striped bicolour of green and red, with the lesser coat of arms of Portugal centered over the colour boundary
- Designed by: Columbano Bordalo Pinheiro
- Use: National colour of military units
- Proportion: 1:1
- Adopted: 30 June 1911
- Design: As above, but evenly striped (1:1) and with the greater coat of arms, displaying a white scroll with the motto "Esta é a ditosa pátria minha amada" ("This is my beloved blissful homeland"), taken from Os Lusíadas, III, 21, v. 1
- Designed by: Columbano Bordalo Pinheiro

The national flag of the Portuguese Republic, often referred to as the Portuguese flag, consists of a rectangular bicolour with a field divided into green on the hoist, and red on the fly. The version without laurels of the country’s national coat of arms stands in the middle of the Portuguese armillary sphere and shield, centered over the colour boundary at equal distance. The flag was announced in 1910, following the 5 October 1910 revolution, inspired by the colours of the Republican Party and the design of radical conspiratorial society the Carbonária.

Its presentation was done on 1 December 1910, after the downfall of the constitutional monarchy on 5 October 1910. However, the official decree approving this flag as the official flag was published on 30 June 1911. This new national flag for the First Portuguese Republic was selected by a special commission whose members included Columbano Bordalo Pinheiro, João Chagas and Abel Botelho. The conjugation of the new field colour, especially the use of green, was not traditional in the Portuguese national flag's composition and represented a radical republican-inspired change that broke the bond with the former monarchical flag. Since a failed republican insurrection on 31 January 1891, red and green had been established as the colours of the Portuguese Republican Party and its associated movements, whose political prominence kept growing until its culmination following the Republican revolution of 5 October 1910. In the ensuing decades, these colours were popularly propagandised. Green represented the hope of the nation and the colour red represented the blood of those who died defending it; this happened to endow the colours with a more patriotic and dignified, therefore less political, sentiment.

The sphere and shield in the middle of the current flag are an integral part of the design, which has historically been centred on the royal arms, usually over fields of blue and white. Since the country's foundation, the standard developed from the blue cross-on-white armorial square banner of King Afonso I, through progressively more complex designs, which did incorporate green and red, to the liberal monarchy's arms over a blue-and-white rectangle. In between, major changes associated with determinant political events contributed to its evolution into the current design.

== Design ==
The decree that legally created the republican flag was approved by the Constituent Assembly and published in government journal no. 141 (Portuguese: diário do Governo) on 19 June 1911. On 30 June, this decree had its regulations officially published in government diary no. 150. Nevertheless, the new flag had been first presented in 1910, on the national holiday of the Restoration of Independence (celebrating December 1, 1640), which was rededicated as the Day of the Flag, although this new designation did not erase the previous one.

=== Construction ===
Flag construction sheet

The flag's length is equal to 1 1/2 times its width, which translates into an aspect ratio of 2:3. The background is vertically divided into two colours: dark green on the hoist side, and scarlet red on the fly. The colour division is made in a way that green spans 2/5 of the length and the remaining 3/5 is filled by red (ratio 2:3). The lesser version of the national coat of arms (without the laurel wreaths)—a white-rimmed national shield on top of a black-highlighted yellow armillary sphere—is positioned over the border between both colours.

The armillary sphere has a diameter equal to 1/2 the height and is equidistant from the upper and lower edges of the flag. The sphere, drawn in perspective, possesses six edge-embossed arcs, four of which are great circles and two are small circles. The great circles represent the ecliptic (wider oblique arc), the equator, and two meridians. These last three are positioned so that the intersections between each two arcs make a right angle; one meridian lies on the flag's plane, while the other is perpendicular to it. The small circles consist of two parallels (the tropics), each tangent to one of the ecliptic-meridian intersections.

Vertically centered over the sphere is the national shield, a white-rimmed curved bottom red shield charged with a white inescutcheon. Its height and width are equal to 7/10 and 6/10 of the sphere's diameter, respectively. The shield is positioned in a way that its limits intersect the sphere:

- at the inflection points of the distal edges of the Tropic of Cancer's anterior half (top) and Tropic of Capricorn's posterior half (bottom);
- at the intersection of the lower edges of the ecliptic's posterior half and of the equator's anterior half (dexter or viewer's left side); and
- at the intersection of the upper edge of the ecliptic's anterior half with the lower edge of the equator's posterior half (sinister or viewer's right side).

A curious aspect of the official design is the absence of a segment of the Tropic of Capricorn, between the national shield and the ecliptic arc.

The white inescutcheon is itself charged with five smaller blue shields (escudetes) arranged like a Greek cross (1+3+1). Each smaller shield holds five white bezants displayed in the form of a saltire (2+1+2). The red bordure is charged with seven yellow castles: three on the chief portion (one in each corner and one in the middle), two in the middle points of each quadrant of the curved base (rotated 45 degrees), and two more on each side of the bordure, over the flag's horizontal middle line. Each castle is composed by a base building, showing a closed (yellow) gate, on top of which stand three battlemented towers. In heraldic terminology, the shield's blazon is described as Argent, five escutcheons in cross azure each charged with five plates in saltire, on a bordure gules seven towers triple-turreted Or, three in chief.^{a}

The specific shades of each colour are not set out in any legal document, varying from display to display, even among digital government sources. Jorge Sampaio's presidential archive displays a version with bright, "pure" colours; while the official website of the president of the Portuguese Republic uses darker, mellower hues.

=== Background ===
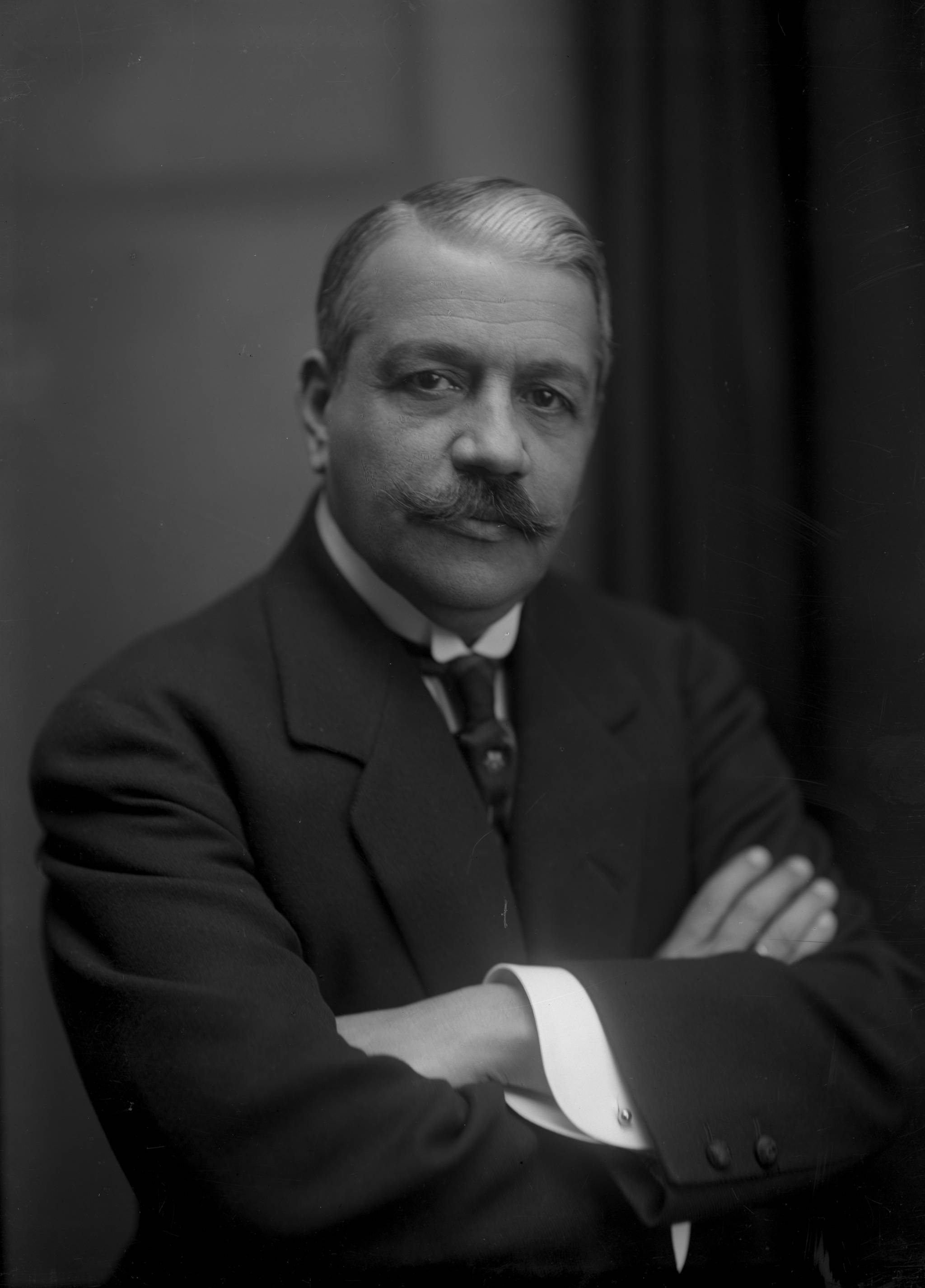
João Chagas, commissioner for the creation of the national flag

The Republican revolution of 5 October 1910, brought a need to replace the symbols of the overthrown monarchy, represented in the first instance by the old national flag and anthem. The choice of the new flag was not one without conflict, especially over the colours, as partisans of the republican red-and-green faced opposition from supporters of the traditional royal blue-and-white. Blue also carried a strong religious meaning as it was the colour of Our Lady of the Conception (Portuguese: Nossa Senhora da Conceição), who was crowned Queen and Patroness of Portugal by King John IV, so its removal or replacement from the future flag was justified by Republicans as one of the many measures needed to secularize the state.

After the presentation and discussion of the many proposals, a governmental commission was set up on 15 October 1910. It included Columbano Bordalo Pinheiro (painter), João Chagas (journalist), Abel Botelho (writer) and two military leaders of 1910: Ladislau Pereira and Afonso Palla. This commission ultimately chose the red-and-green of the Portuguese Republican Party, delivering an explanation based on patriotic reasons, which disguised the political significance behind the choice, as these had been the colours present on the banners of the rebellious during the republican insurrection of 31 January 1891, in Porto, and during the monarchy-overthrowing revolution, in Lisbon.

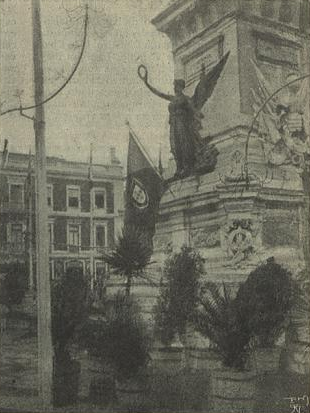
The new national flag is hoised for the first time on the Monument to the Restorers (Restauradores), in Lisbon, on 1 December 1910

The commission considered that red should "be present as one of the main colours, because it is the battling, warm, virile colour, par excellence. It is the colour of conquest and laughter. A singing, burning, joyful colour ... Recalls the idea of blood and urges to achieve victory". An explanation for the inclusion of the green was harder to come up with, given that it was not a traditional colour of the Portuguese flag's history. Eventually, it was justified on the grounds that, during the 1891 insurrection, this was the colour present on the revolutionary flag that "sparked the redeeming lightning" of republicanism. Finally, white (on the shield) represented "a beautiful and fraternal colour, into which all other colours merge themselves, colour of simplicity, of harmony and peace", adding that "it is this same colour that, charged with enthusiasm and faith by the red cross of Christ, marks the Discoveries epic cycle".

The Manueline armillary sphere, which had been present on the national flag under the reign of John VI, was revived because it consecrated the "Portuguese epic maritime history ... the ultimate challenge, essential to our collective life." The Portuguese shield was kept, being positioned over the armillary sphere. Its presence would immortalize the "human miracle of positive bravery, tenacity, diplomacy, and audacity, that managed to bind the first links of the Portuguese nation's social and political affirmation", since it is one of the "most vigorous symbols of the national identity and integrity".

The new flag was produced in large numbers at the Cordoaria Nacional ("National Rope House") and was officially presented nationwide on 1 December 1910, on occasion of the 270 years of the Restoration of Independence. This day had already been declared by the government as the "Flag Day" (currently not celebrated). In the capital, it was paraded from the city hall to the Restauradores ("Restorers") Monument, where it was hoisted. This festive presentation did not mask, however, the turmoil caused by a design chosen single-handedly without prior popular consultation, and that represented more of a political regime than a whole nation. To encourage a greater acceptance of the new flag, the government issued all teaching establishments with one exemplar, whose symbols were to be explained to the students; textbooks were changed to intensively display these symbols. Also, 1 December ("Flag Day"), 31 January and 5 October were declared national holidays.

== Symbolism ==
The Portuguese flag displays three important symbols: the field colours, and the armillary sphere and national shield, which make up the coat of arms.

=== Colours ===
Portuguese banner with a green Aviz cross used from 1385 to 1485

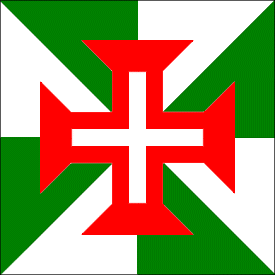
Green, red and white Order of Christ flag used in the Portuguese Discoveries

War flag of Portugal used in the Restoration War in 1640

Green royal standard of King Peter II of Portugal

Green-and-white pennant used by Portuguese Navy ships in the 17th and early 18th centuries

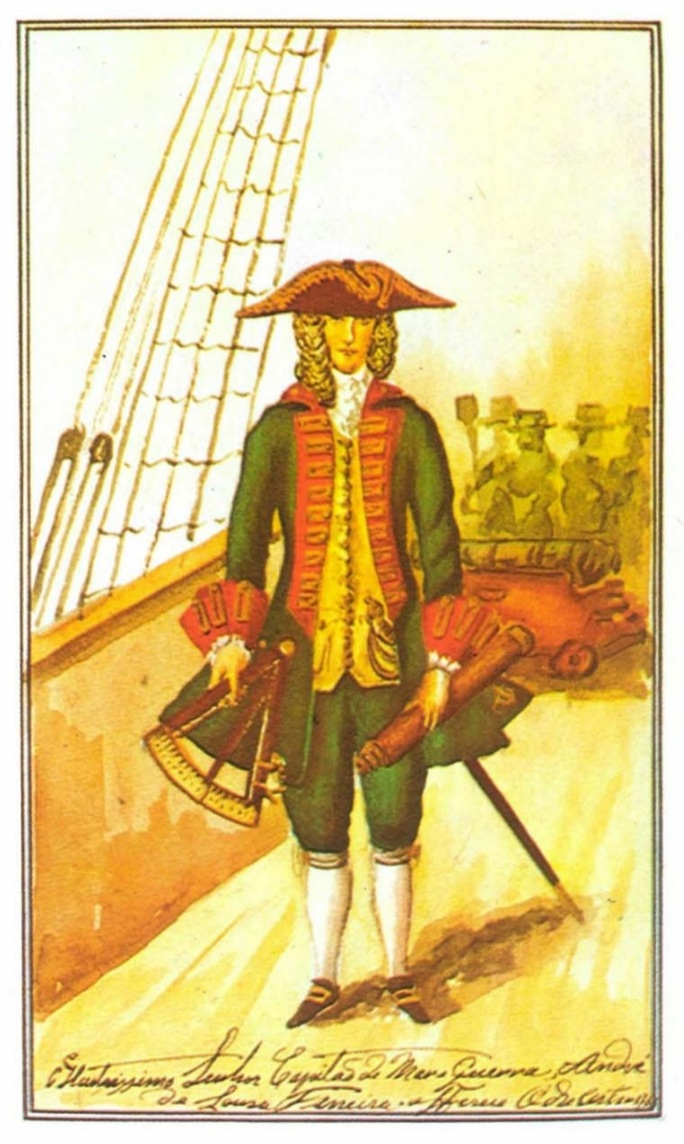
Green-and-red uniforms were worn by marines of the Terço da Armada in the 17th and 18th centuries

Despite the fact that the colours of red and green had never constituted a major part of the national flag until 1910, they were present in several historical banners and military uniforms during important periods. King John I included a green Aviz cross on the red bordure of his banner. The red cross of the Order of Christ was used over a green-and-white field as a naval pennon during the Discoveries. A green background version was a popular standard of the rebellious during the 1640 revolution that restored Portugal's independence from Spain. The House of Braganza had green as its livery colour, making it the national colour of Portugal in the 17th and 18th centuries, with ships of the Portuguese Navy flying green-and-white pennants and the marines of the Terço da Armada wearing green-and-red uniforms. However, there are no registered sources to confirm that this was the origin of the republican colours.

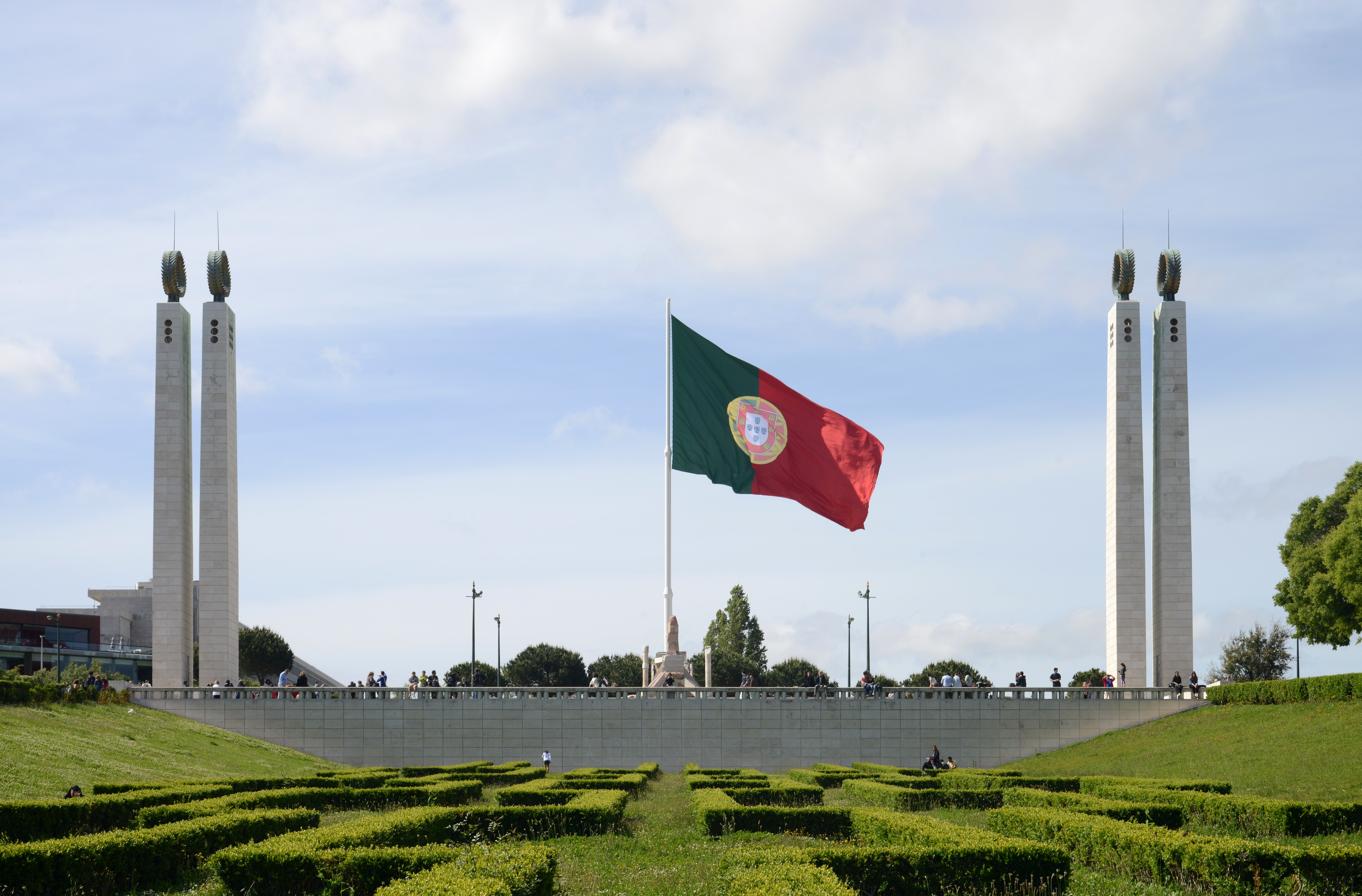
A Portuguese flag flying at the top of the Edward VII Park in Lisbon

Another explanation gives full credit to the flag that was hoisted on the balcony of Porto's city hall during the 1891 insurrection. It consisted of a red field bearing a green disc and the inscription Centro Democrático Federal «15 de Novembro» ("15 November" Federal Democratic Centre), representing one of many masonry-inspired republican clubs. Over the following 20 years, the red-and-green was present on every republican item in Portugal. The 1891 flag-inherited red stands for the colour of the republican-inspired masonry-backed revolutionaries, whereas green was the colour Auguste Comte had destined to be present in the flags of positivist nations, an ideal incorporated into the republican political matrix. Green was also added in order to distinguish the flag from the old royal standard, which had a background of solid red.

=== Coat of arms ===
==== Escutcheon ====
Escutcheon

The Portuguese shield rests over the armillary sphere. Except during the reign of Afonso I, it is present in every single historical flag, in one form or another. It is the prime Portuguese symbol as well as one of the oldest, with the first elements of today's shield appearing during the reign of Sancho I. The evolution of the Portuguese flag is inherently associated with the evolution of the shield.

Within the white inescutcheon, the five small blue shields with their five white bezants representing the five wounds of Christ (Portuguese: Cinco Chagas) when crucified and are popularly associated with the "Miracle of Ourique". The story associated with this miracle tells that before the Battle of Ourique on 25 July 1139, an old hermit appeared before Count Afonso Henriques (future Afonso I) as a divine messenger. He foretold Afonso's victory and assured him that God was watching over him and his peers. The messenger advised him to walk away from his camp, alone, if he heard a nearby chapel bell tolling, in the following night. In doing so, he witnessed an apparition of Jesus on the cross. Ecstatic, Afonso heard Jesus promising victories for the coming battles, as well as God's wish to act through Afonso, and his descendants, in order to create an empire which would carry his name to unknown lands, thus choosing the Portuguese to perform great tasks.

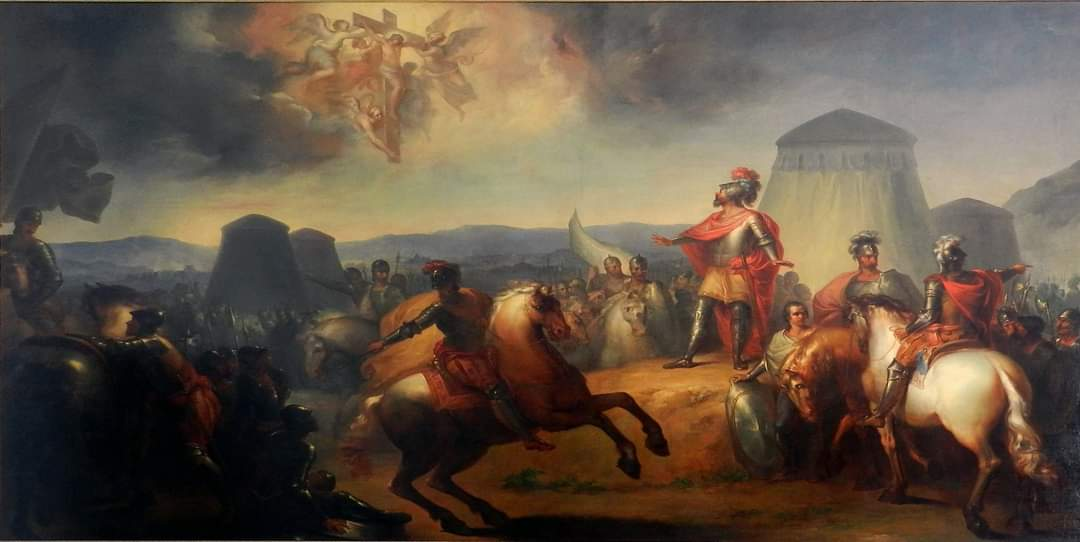
O Milagre de Ourique (The Miracle of Ourique), by Domingos Sequeira (1763)

Boosted by this spiritual experience, Afonso won the battle against an outnumbering enemy. Legend has it that Afonso killed the five Moorish kings of the Seville, Badajoz, Elvas, Évora and Beja taifas, before decimating the enemy troops. Hence, in gratitude to Jesus, he incorporated five shields arranged in a cross—representing his divine-led victory over the five enemy kings—with each one carrying Christ's five wounds in the form of silver bezants. The sum of all bezants (doubling the ones in the central shield) would give thirty, symbolizing Judas Iscariot's thirty pieces of silver.

However, evidence pointing out that the number of bezants on each shield was greater than five during long periods following Afonso I's reign, as well as the fact that only in the 15th century was this legend registered on a chronicle by Fernão Lopes (1419), support this explanation as one of pure myth and highly charged with patriotic feeling in the sense that Portugal was created by divine intervention and was destined for great things.

The seven castles are traditionally considered a symbol of the Portuguese victories over their Moorish enemies, under Afonso III, who supposedly captured seven enemy fortresses in the course of his conquest of the Algarve, concluded in 1249. However, this explanation is weakly founded since this king did not have seven castles on his banner, but an unspecified number. Some reconstructions display about sixteen castles; this number changed to twelve in 1385, to seven in 1485 and to eleven in 1495; it then changed back to seven, in 1578, this time definitively. An hypothesis about the origin of the castles on a red bordure lies in the family ties of Afonso III with Castile (both his mother and second wife were Castilian), whose arms consisted of a golden castle on a red field.

A variant of the Portuguese shield is found in the flag of Ceuta, a Spanish city on the North African coast, and is used as the city's coat of arms, in a nod to its former history as a Portuguese possession.

==== Armillary sphere ====
The armillary sphere with a red line indicating the cropped segment.

The armillary sphere was an important astronomical and navigational instrument for the Portuguese sailors who ventured into unknown seas during the Age of Discoveries. It was introduced by the Knights Templar, whose knowledge was essential to the Portuguese Discoveries—Henry, the Navigator, the person mainly responsible for the development of Age of Discovery was actually the Grand Master of the Order of Christ. It thus became the symbol of the most important period of the nation—the Portuguese discoveries. In light of this, King Manuel I, who ruled during this period, incorporated the armillary sphere into his personal banner. It was simultaneously used as the ensign of ships plying the route between the metropolis and Brazil, thus becoming a colonial symbol and a key element of the flags of the future Brazilian kingdom and empire.

Adding to the sphere's significance was its common use on every Manueline-influenced architectural work, where it is one of the major stylistic elements, as seen on the Jerónimos Monastery and Belém Tower.

After the proclamation of the republic in 1910, commission appointed by the government to study the symbols of the new republic suggested the armillary sphere as "the eternal standard of our adventurous spirit".

== Evolution ==
Since the foundation of the kingdom, the banner of arms, i.e. the flag form of the royal arms, have served as national flag. In fact, until the 19th century, the flag served as a mere support to display the Royal coat of arms, without having any separate meaning. Until the 16th century, the flag consisted in a banner of arms, with its field being totally occupied by the field of the coat of arms, then it came to include the complete coat of arms, including the crown and other external elements laid over a monochrome white field. The flag only acquired a meaning by its own in 1830, when its field was changed from the neutral white to the distinctive blue and white, which were the national colours at that time. Although representing the country since its early beginnings, the flag of Portugal had a limited use until the 19th century, essentially being used as a fortress flag and as naval ensign, with some other flags also existing to represent the nation in other contexts, namely at sea. In the 19th century, the flag of Portugal started to have a universal use, becoming a real national flag. It evolved in a way that gradually incorporated most of the symbols present on the current coat of arms.

=== 1095–1248 ===
Count Henry (1095)

King Afonso I (1143)

King Sancho I (1185)

The first heraldic symbol that can be associated with what would become the Portuguese nation was on the shield used by Henry of Burgundy, Count of Portugal since 1095, during his battles with the Moors. This shield consisted of a blue cross over a white field. Nevertheless, this design has no reliable sources since it is a reconstruction that became popular and widely accepted thanks to the nationalistic purposes of the Estado Novo regime.

Henry's son Afonso Henriques succeeded him in the county and took on the same shield. In 1139, despite being outnumbered, he defeated an army of Almoravid Moors at the Battle of Ourique and proclaimed himself Afonso I, King of Portugal, in front of his troops. Following the official recognition by the neighbouring León, Afonso changed his shield in order to reflect his new political status. Sources state he charged the cross with five sets of an unspecified number of silver bezants (most likely large-headed silver nails), one set on the centre and one on each arm, symbolizing Afonso's newly gained right to issue currency.

During the time of Afonso I, it was typical not to repair battle damage inflicted on the shield, so changes such as the breaking off of pieces, colour shifting or stains were very common. When Sancho I succeeded his father Afonso I, in 1185, he inherited a very worn off shield: the blue-stained leather that made the cross had been lost except where the bezants (nails) held it in place. This involuntary degradation was the basis for the next step on the evolution of the national coat of arms, where a plain blue cross transformed into a compound cross of five blue bezant-charged escutcheons—the quina (Portuguese word meaning "group of five") were thus born. Sancho's personal shield (called "Portugal ancien") consisted of a white field with a compound cross of five shields (each one charged with eleven silver bezants) with the bottom edges of the lateral ones facing towards the centre. Both Sancho's son Afonso II and grandson Sancho II used these arms, as it was usual with direct succession lines (cadency system). A new modification of the royal arms was made when Sancho II's younger brother became king, in 1248.

=== 1248–1495 ===
King Afonso III (1248)

King John I (1385)

King John II (1485)

Afonso III of Portugal was not the eldest son, therefore heraldic practices stated he should not take his father's arms without adding a personal variation. Before becoming king, Afonso was married to Matilda II of Boulogne but her inability to provide him with a royal heir led Afonso to divorce her, in 1253. He then married Beatrice of Castile, an illegitimate daughter of Alfonso X of Castile. It is more likely that it was this family connection with Castile (his mother was also Castilian) that justified the new heraldic addition to the royal arms—a red bordure charged with an undetermined number of yellow castles—rather than the definitive conquest of the Algarve and its Moorish fortresses, considering that the number of castles was only fixed in the late 16th century.

The inner portion contained the arms of Sancho I, although the number of bezants varied between seven, eleven and sixteen (the latter number was used on Afonso's personal standard while he was still Count of Boulogne). This same design was used by the Portuguese kings until the end of the first dynasty, in 1383; a succession crisis put the country at war with Castile and left it without a ruler for two years.

In 1385, in the wake of the Battle of Aljubarrota, a second dynasty was founded when John, Master of the Order of Aviz and illegitimate son of King Peter I, acceded to the throne as John I. To his personal banner, John I added his Order's fleur-de-lys cross, displayed as green flowery points on the red bordure; this inclusion reduced the number of castles to twelve (three around each corner). The number of bezants in each escutcheon was reduced from eleven to seven. This banner lasted a hundred years until John I's great-grandson John II restyled it, in 1485, introducing important changes: the removal of the Aviz cross, a downward arrangement and edge-smoothing of the shields, and the definitive fixing of five saltire-arranged bezants in each shield (summing up six quinas, i.e., six "groups of five": one quina of shields and five quinas of bezants) and seven castles on the bordure (as it is currently). John II's banner was the last armorial square banner used as the "national" flag or standard. Following his death, in 1495, radical changes were made by his successor.

=== 1495–1667 ===
King Manuel I (1495)

King John III (1521)

King Sebastian (1578)

King John IV (1640)

John II was succeeded by his first cousin Manuel I, in 1495. This king was the first to convert the traditional square armorial banner into a rectangular (2:3) field with the coat of arms on its centre. Specifically, the flag was now a white rectangle centrally charged with the coat of arms (bearing eleven castles) on an ogival or heater-shaped shield and surmounted by an open royal crown. Manuel I possessed a personal standard which included the armillary sphere for the first time.

In 1521, John III made minor changes to the flag by adopting a coat of arms (bearing only seven castles) with a round shaped shield.

In 1578, during the reign of Sebastian and on the eve of the fatal Battle of Alcácer Quibir, the flag was again modified. The number of castles was permanently fixed at seven and the royal crown was converted into a closed three-arched crown, which symbolized a stronger royal authority. With Sebastian's death and the short-lived reign of his great-uncle Cardinal Henry, in 1580, a dynastic crisis was solved with the Spanish king Philip II acceding to the Portuguese throne as Philip I, installing a Spanish dynasty. The accession was made on the condition that Portugal was ruled as a separate, autonomous state, not as a province. This was fulfilled as Portugal and Spain formed a personal union under Philip I and his successors. A consequence of this administrative situation was the maintenance of the flag created under Sebastian's reign as the Portuguese national flag, while Spain had its own. As the ruling house in Portugal, the Habsburg banner also included the Portuguese arms.

The country regained its independence from Spain, in 1640, in a coup d'état that placed on the throne John, Duke of Bragança, as King John IV. Under his rule, the national flag was slightly changed as the ogival shield became rounded. It was from this reign forward that the royal arms and the kingdom's arms became separate banners.

=== 1667–1830 ===
King Peter II (1667)

King John V (1707)

King Joseph I (1750)

King John VI (1816)

Queen Maria II (1826)

When Afonso VI's younger brother Peter II replaced him on the throne, in 1667, he adapted the flag's crown to fit the contemporary trends by transforming it into a five-arched crown. The new flag did not remain unchanged for too long, as it was refurbished by Peter's son John V, after he took the throne, in 1707. Heavily influenced by the luxurious and ostentatious court of the French king Louis XIV, and by France's political and cultural impact in Europe, John V wanted to transpose such style into the country's coat of arms. A red beret was then added under the crown. Besides the change of the crown, the shields started to be represented, on the flags, not only in the traditional round bottom shape ("Iberian type"), but also in other formats like the samnitic ("French type"), the horsehead ("Italian type") or the oval ("cartouche") shapes. Instated by an absolute monarch like John V, this flag endured through almost the entire absolutist period in Portugal—John V (1707–1750), Joseph I (1750–1777) and Maria I (1777–1816).

During the second half of the 17th century, the maritime use of the white flag with the Royal coat of arms of Portugal was increasingly restricted to the war ships. An ordinance of 1692 expressly banned the use of this flag by the Portuguese merchant ships, restricting its use to ships with 20 or more cannons and with a complement of 40 or more men. The Portuguese merchant ships flew instead green and white striped flags, which were the national colours of Portugal at that time. The colours green and white were also used in other Portuguese flags, like the naval commissioning pennants.

With the invasion of Portugal by Napoleon's imperial army in 1807, the Portuguese Royal Court fled to Brazil, establishing the capital of the Portuguese Monarchy and Empire in Rio de Janeiro. In 1815, the Portuguese state of Brazil was elevated to a kingdom, thus receiving the same status as the Kingdom of Portugal and the Algarves. The whole of the Portuguese Monarchy became then the United Kingdom of Portugal, Brazil and the Algarves. To reflect the change of the status of the Portuguese Monarchy, the Prince Regent John (future King João VI, at that time still reigning in name of his mother, Queen Mary I) established a new Royal coat of arms, where the Portuguese shield (representing Portugal and the Algarves) charged a blue-filled yellow armillary sphere (representing Brazil) surmounted by the same beret-bearing five-arched crown. The new coat of arms replaced the previous one in the Portuguese flags.

Despite the end of the United Kingdom of Portugal, Brazil and the Algarves, when Brazil became independent in 1822, its coat of arms continued to be used, inclusive in flags, until the death of João VI in 1826. From then on, the previous coat of arms, without the armillary sphere, became in use again.

=== 1830–1910 ===
Queen Maria II (1830)

Queen Maria II (1830)

João VI died in Lisbon in 1826. His elder son Peter, who had declared the independence of Brazil in 1822, becoming Emperor Pedro I, succeeded to the Portuguese throne as Pedro IV. Because the new Brazilian constitution did not allow further personal unions of Portugal and Brazil, Pedro abdicated the Portuguese crown in favour of his elder daughter Maria da Glória, who became Maria II of Portugal. She was only seven years old, so Pedro stated she would marry his brother Miguel who would act as regent. However, in 1828, Miguel deposed Maria and proclaimed himself king, abolishing the 1822 liberal constitution and ruling as an absolute monarch. This started the period of the Liberal Wars.

The liberals formed a separate government exiled on the Azorean island of Terceira. This government issued two decrees establishing modifications to the national flag. While supporters of usurper King Miguel I still upheld the flag established by João VI, the liberal supporters imposed important changes on it. The background was equally divided along its length into blue (hoist) and white (fly); the armillary sphere (associated with Brazil) was removed and the coat of arms was centred over the colour boundary; and the shield reverted to the "French type" shape of João V. This new flag configuration was decreed solely for terrestrial use, but a variation of it was used as the national ensign. This ensign differed in the way the colours occupied the background (blue 1/3, white 2/3) with a consequent positional shift of the arms.

With the defeat and exile of Miguel in 1834, Queen Maria II returned to the throne and the standard of the victorious side was hoisted in Lisbon as the new national flag. It was in use for 80 years, witnessing the last period of the Portuguese monarchy until its abolition in 1910. Currently this flag is used by Portuguese monarchists. The Independence Day parade of Brazil also presented this flag in the standard marchpast, along with other historical flags of Portugal and Brazil.

== Flag protocol ==
=== Use ===
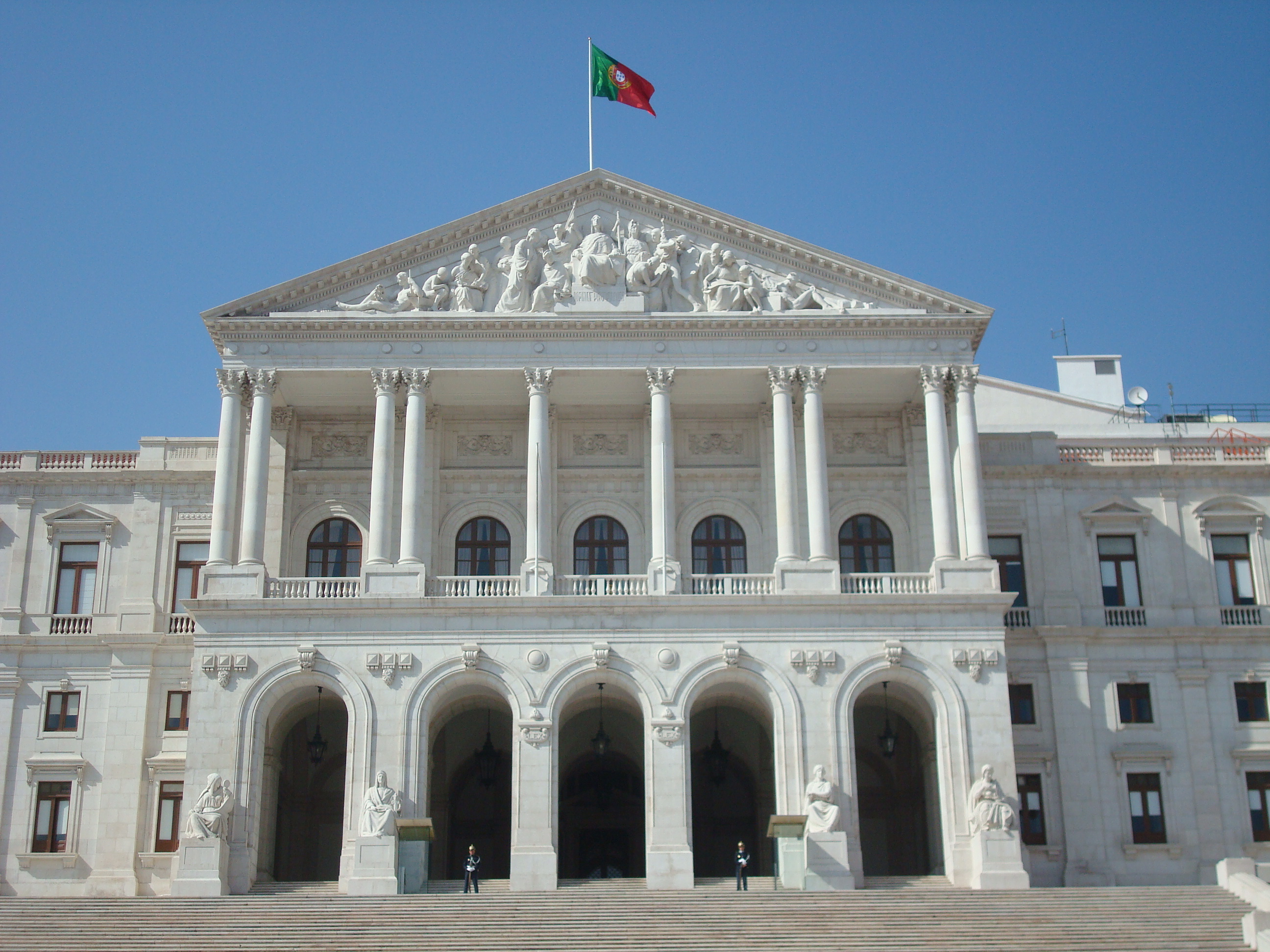
Flag hoisted at the Portuguese Parliament, in Lisbon

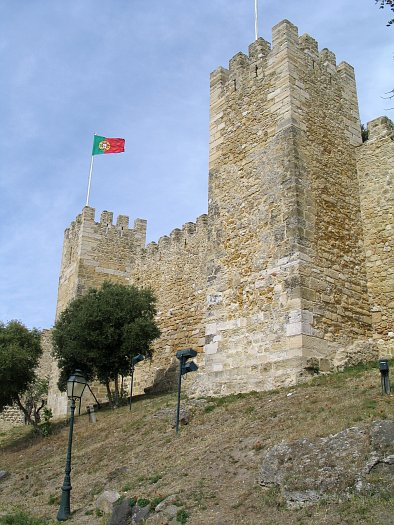
Flag hoisted at the Castle of São Jorge

The Portuguese legislation concerning the use of the National Flag is mostly limited to the Decree-law 150/87, issued on 30 March 1987, which replaced the previous scarce legislation dated back to the beginning of the 20th century.

The Decree-law 150/87 states that the flag is to be hoisted from 9:00 a.m. to sunset (during the night, it must be properly lit), on Sundays and national holidays, throughout the entire national territory. It can also be displayed on days where official ceremonies or other solemn public sessions are held; in this case, the flag is hoisted on-site. The flag can be hoisted on other days if it is considered appropriate by the central government, or by other regional or local governing bodies, or by heads of private institutions. It must follow the official design standard and be preserved in good condition.

The headquarters buildings of the bodies of sovereignty, the flag can stay hoisted on a daily basis. It can also be hoisted on civilian and military national monuments; on public buildings associated with the central, regional or local administration; and on headquarters of public corporations and institutions. Citizens and private institutions can also display it, on the condition that they respect the relevant legal procedures. At the facilities of nationally based international organizations or in the case of international meetings, the flag is hoisted according to the protocol used on those situations.

If national mourning is declared, the flag will be flown at half-staff during the fixed number of days; any flag hoisted along with it will be flown in the same manner.

When unfurled in the presence of other flags, the national flag must not have smaller dimensions and must be situated in a prominent, honourable place, according to the relevant protocol.

If there are more than one flagpole, the National Flag should be flown:

- Two flagpoles – on the right pole viewed by a person facing the exterior;
- Three flagpoles – on the central pole;
- More than three flagpoles:
  - Within a building – if an odd number of poles, on the central pole; if an even number, on the first pole on the right of the centre;
  - Outside a building – always on the rightmost pole;

If the flagpoles do not have the same height, the flag must be flown on the highest pole. The poles should be placed in honourable locations of the ground, building façades and roofs. On public acts where the flag is not hoisted, it can be suspended from a distinct spot, but never used as decoration, covering or for any purpose that can diminish its dignity.

=== Penalties ===
An early decree, from 28 December 1910, established that "any person who, through speech, published writings or any other public act, shows lack of respect to the national flag, which is the fatherland's symbol, will be sentenced to a three to twelve-month prison term with corresponding fine and, in case of relapse, will be sentenced to exile, as stated in the 62nd article of the Penal Code". In its 332nd article, the current penal code punishes infractions with a prison sentence of up to two years. If the sentence is shorter than 240 days, there is a formula for converting it into a fine. If the offense is directed towards regional symbols, the penalties are halved.

=== Folding ===
During formal occasions, four people are required to properly fold the flag, where each person holds one of the sides. A correctly folded flag must be a square limiting the national shield. However, the order by which the different folding steps are performed to achieve this result is not legislated.

The procedure begins with the flag fully extended and held in a horizontal plane with the obverse facing down. One of the possible folding sequences is demonstrated below:

Stage	Description	Example
First	The upper third of the flag's height is folded into the reverse side until the crease is positioned over the shield's upper edge line.	
Second	The lower third of the flag's height is folded into the reverse side until the crease is positioned over the shield's lowest point.	
Third	The folding proceeds along the width axis, with the fly's (red) union with the hoist (green) and the fold's placement over the shield's right edge.	
Fourth	Finally, the hoist is folded in a way that the resulting crease lies on top of the shield's left edge.	

== Military flags ==
The National Flag of Portugal also serves as war flag and ensign, so being flown on military facilities and naval ships. There are however specific national military flags for specific uses, namely the military colours, the naval jack and the naval pennant. The military colours are occasionally referred as war flag, however they are not to be flown on military facilities but are only to be carried by the military units on parades.

National colours

Naval jack

Naval commissioning pennant

=== National colours ===
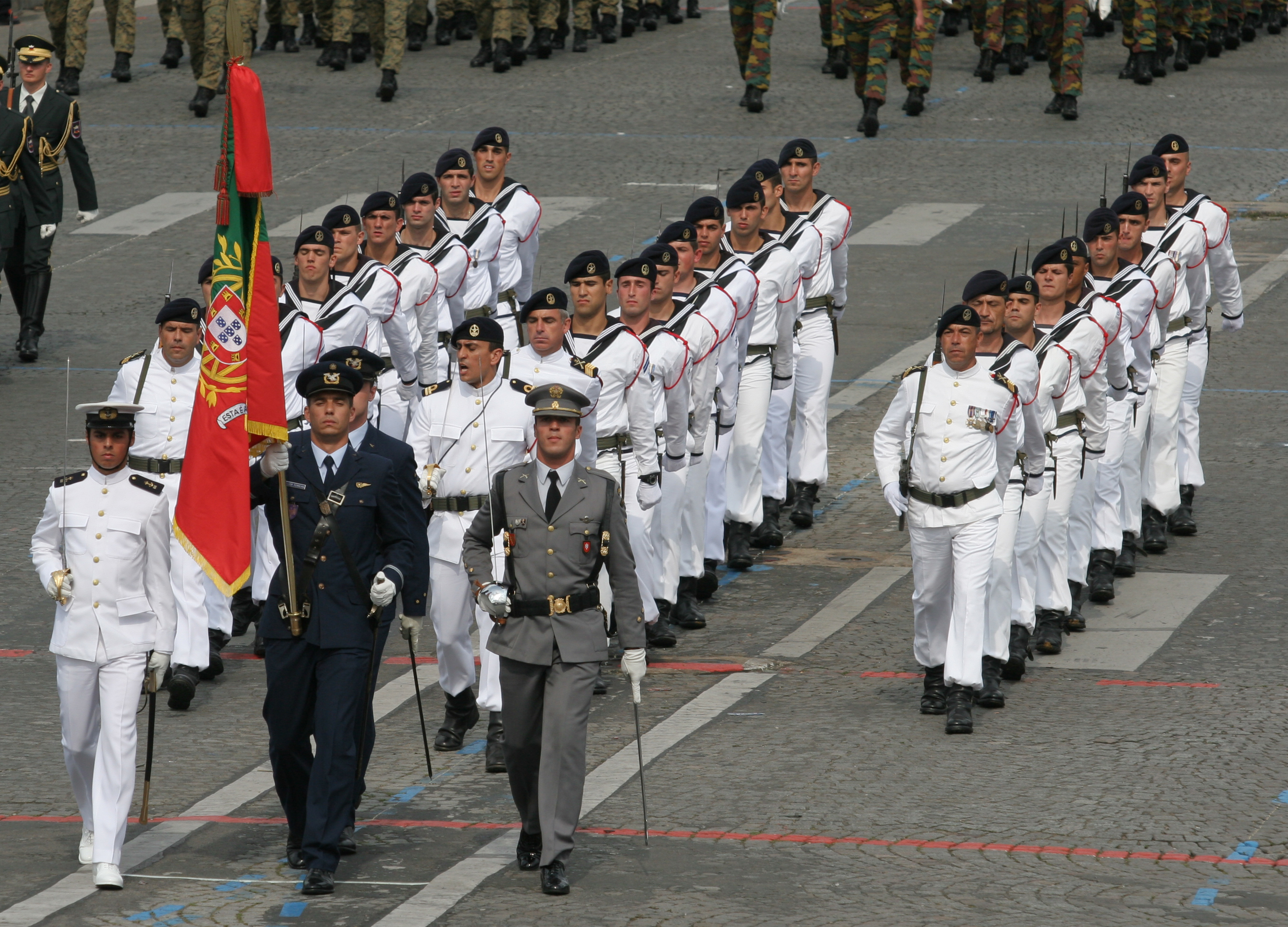
A Portuguese tri-service colour guard leads a detachment of marines, carrying the national colours during the 2007 Bastille Day Military Parade in Paris

The national colours constitute the portable variants of the National Flag for use on parades by the military units. In the past, the colours had a practical function, being used as a signal to guide the military units in battle. Originally, the colours were referred as "regimental flags" (bandeiras regimentais) or "military units flags" (bandeiras das unidades militares), but now they are referred as "national standards" (estandartes nacionais). The colours are always carried in parade by a junior officer, escorted by a colour guard.

The standard model of the colours – also adopted in 1911 – is a rectangular flag measuring 1.20 m (3 ft 11 in) in width and 1.20 m (3 ft 11 in) in length (ratio 1:1). Green and red are positioned at the hoist and fly, respectively, but occupy the field in an equal manner (1:1). Centred over the colour boundary lie the armillary sphere and Portuguese shield, surrounded by two yellow laurel branches intersecting at their stems. These are bound by a white stripe bearing the verse by Luís de Camões "Esta é a ditosa pátria minha amada" (English: "This is my beloved blissful homeland") as the motto. This differs from the version of coat of arms employed as emblem, where the laurel shoots are tied by a green and red stripe without the verse. The sphere's outer diameter is one-third of the width and lies 35 cm (14 in) from the upper edge and 45 cm (18 in) from the lower edge.

Official design for the standardized model of the national colours, adopted in 2020.

Although the 1911 regulation is, theoretically, still in force, the various branches of the Armed Forces made specific changes to it and so, several types of colours are used by the different military units. For example, the colours adopted by the Portuguese Army, in 1979, measures just 0.80 m × 0.80 m (2 ft 7 in × 2 ft 7 in).

=== Naval jack ===
The Portuguese naval jack (jaco or jaque) is only hoisted at the prow of docked or anchored Navy ships, from sunrise to sunset. The national flag is permanently hoisted at the stern, when sailing, and from sunrise to sunset, when docked. It is a square flag (ratio 1:1) bearing a green-bordered red field with the minor coat of arms on the centre. The width of the green border and the diameter of the armillary sphere are equal to 1/8 and 3/7 of the side's dimension, respectively.

=== Commissioning pennant ===
The Portuguese commissioning pennant (flâmula) is a long triangular flag, green on the hoist and red on the fly. It is to be flown on the main mast of the naval ships commanded by officers.

== Government flags ==
Highly ranked state and governmental offices are also represented by their own flags. The President of the Republic (Presidente da República) uses a flag largely similar to the national flag, except for having dark green as the only background colour. It is usually hoisted at the President's official residence, the Palace of Belém, as well as on the presidential car, as small-sized flags. The flag of the Prime Minister is a white rectangle (ratio 2:3) with a dark green saltire, holding the lesser coat of arms on its centre, and a red bordure charged with a pattern of yellow laurel leaves. Other ministerial flags do not possess the red bordure. The flag of the Assembly of the Republic (Assembleia da República), the national parliament, is also a white rectangle (ratio 2:3) with the lesser coat of arms in the centre and a dark green border.

President of the Republic

Assembly of the Republic

Prime Minister

Minister (except the Minister of Defence)

Minister of Defence

== See also ==
- Portuguese vexillology
- List of Portuguese flags
- Coat of arms of Portugal

== Notes ==
- From the original Portuguese blazon: "De prata, cinco escudetes, de blau, postos em cruz, cada um carregado com cinco besantes, de prata, postos em aspa; bordadura, de gules, carregada com sete castelos, de ouro, dos quais três em chefe".
