= Flag of the Assembly of the Republic =

Legislature flag

- Proportion: 2:3
- Adopted: December 2006
- Design: A white rectangle with the lesser national coat of arms in center, bordered in green
- Designed by: Created by Resolution of the Assembly of the Republic no. 73/2006

The flag of the Assembly of the Republic is the flag of the unicameral parliament of Portugal, the Assembly of the Republic.

== History ==
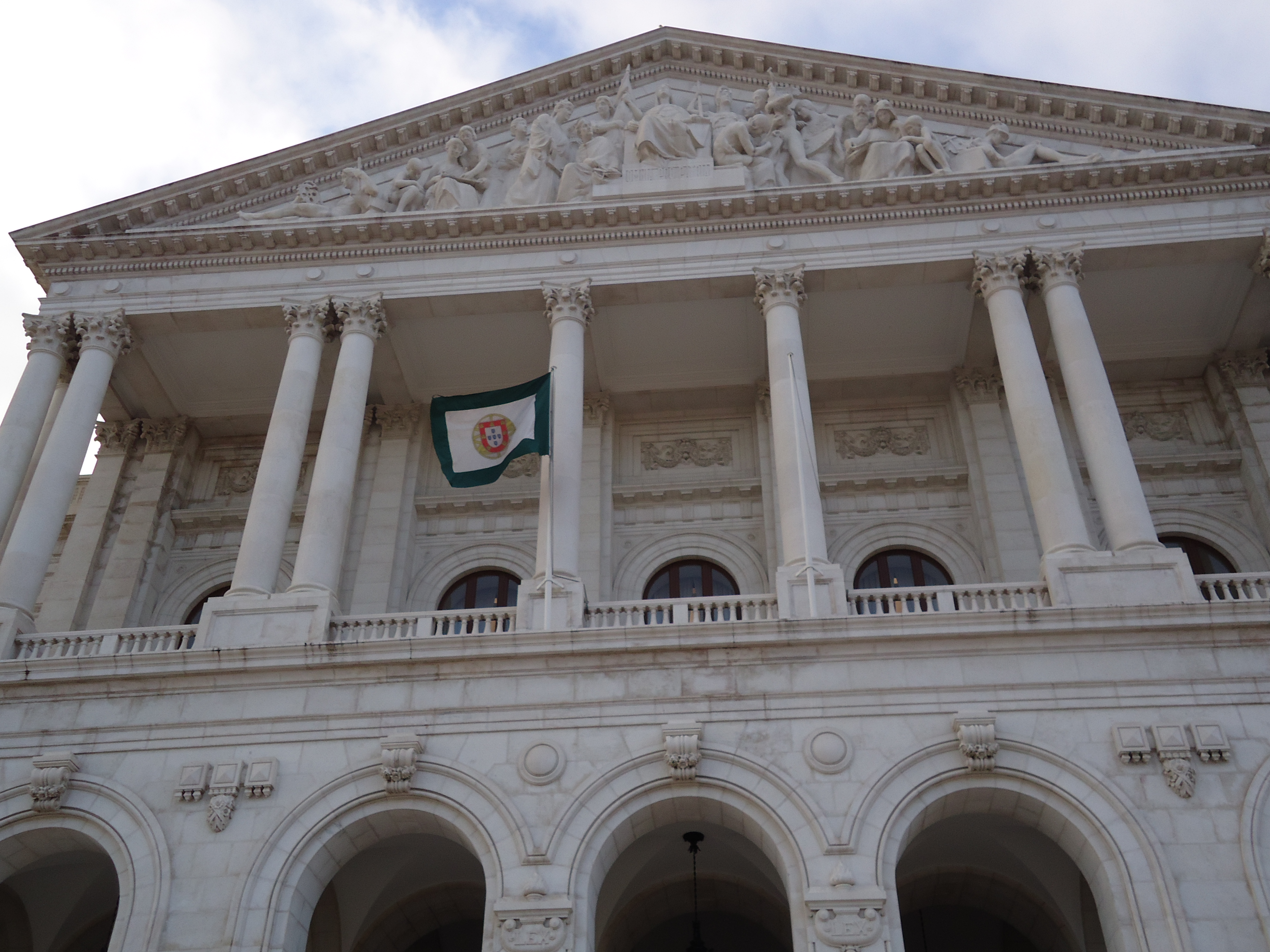
The Flag of the Assembly of the Republic flying from the São Bento Palace

The idea of the flag began as a proposal by the president of the Assembly at the time, Jaime Gama. The flag was established in 2006 by Resolution of the Assembly of the Republic No. 73, dated 14 December 2006 and published on 28 December 2006 in issue number 248 of the Diário da República. It was hoisted for the first time on 3 January 2007 on the balcony of the Salão Nobre of the São Bento Palace.

== See also ==
- Flag of Portugal
- List of Portuguese flags
