= Order of Christ Cross =

Cross symbol of Portugal

Cross of Order of Christ

Cross of the Supreme Order of Christ

The Cross of the Order of Christ (Portuguese: Cruz da Ordem de Cristo), also known as the Cross of Christ (Cruz de Cristo) or the Portuguese Cross (Cruz Portuguesa), is a cross symbol of Portugal, originating in the Portuguese Order of Christ, founded in 1319. During the time of Prince Henry the Navigator, the cross came to be associated with the Portuguese discoveries and the Portuguese Empire. The cross can be considered a variant of the cross pattée or the cross potent.

== History ==
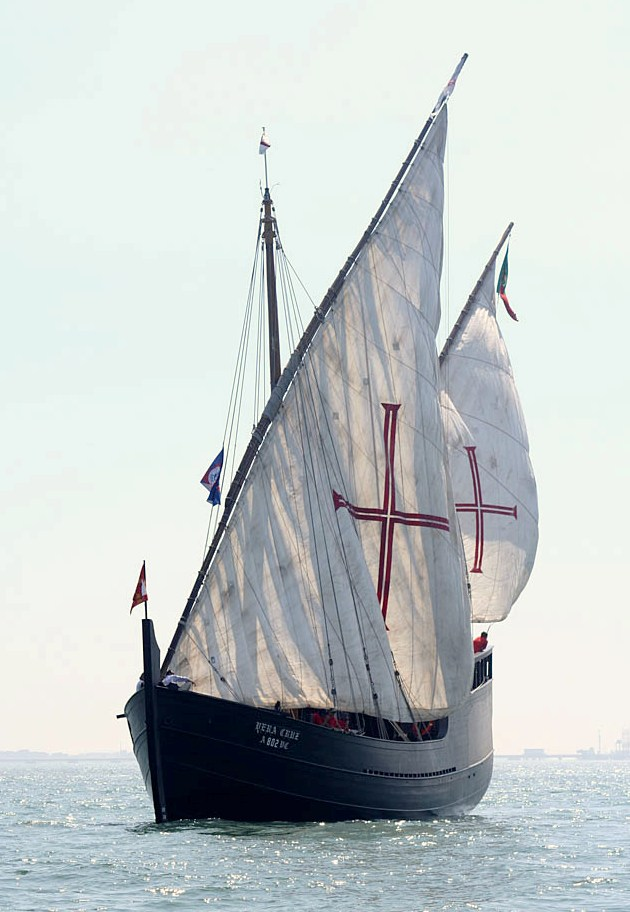
Replica of a Portuguese caravel used during the Portuguese discoveries

As the Order of Christ, led by Prince Henry, the Navigator, was a leading developer of the Portuguese Discoveries, the Cross of Christ was used on the sails of the Portuguese caravels, carracks and other ships involved in the exploration of the seas. Because of this, the emblem was forever associated with the Portuguese discoveries, making it one of the main symbols of the discoveries and of the Portuguese Empire.

After, Manuel, duke of Beja and governor of the Order of Christ, having become King of Portugal, the Cross of Christ came to be regarded and used as a national emblem of Portugal. It has since become a generic Portuguese and, later, Brazilian emblem. After Pedro declared the independence of Brazil, and became Emperor of Brazil, the Cross of Christ was also present in the coat of arms and flag of the former Empire of Brazil.

Since 1789, the Cross of Christ is depicted on the Sash of the Three Orders.

It was also the symbol of the Movimento Nacional-Sindicalista, a Portuguese political movement of the early 1930s.

== Usage ==
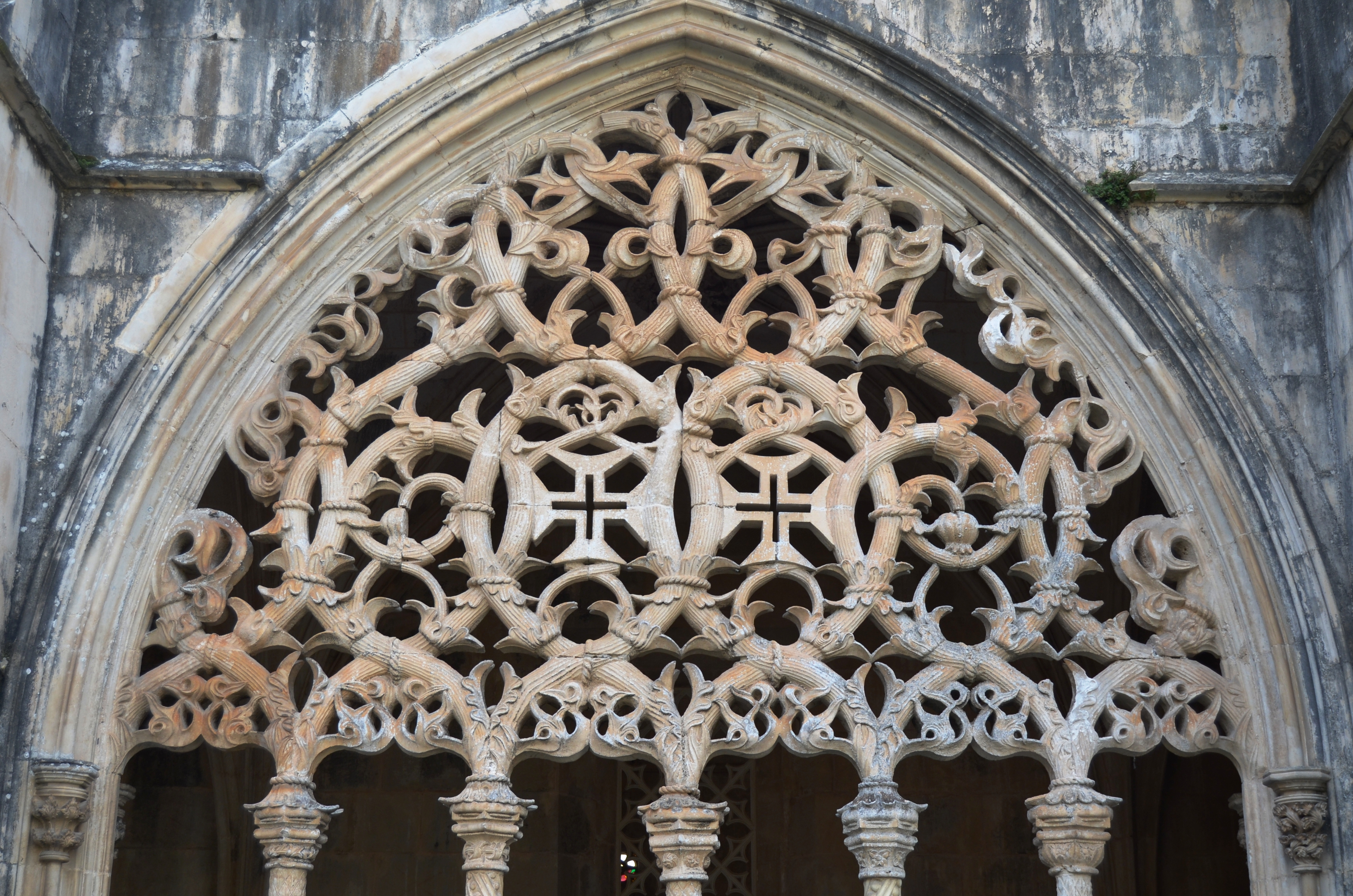
Crosses of the Order of Christ at the Monastery of Batalha

Today, the Cross of Christ is present in many flags and emblems of Portugal and Brazil. Examples are the flags of the city of São Paulo and the Portuguese Autonomous Region of Madeira, the coat of arms of several Portuguese and Brazilian cities and municipalities, the badges of the Portuguese and Brazil national football teams and the roundels of the Portuguese Air Force aircraft.

Vasco da Gama, a Brazilian football club founded by Portuguese imigrants, also uses the cross as one of its symbols on kits and promotions as a reference to the club's namesake caravels.

== Gallery ==
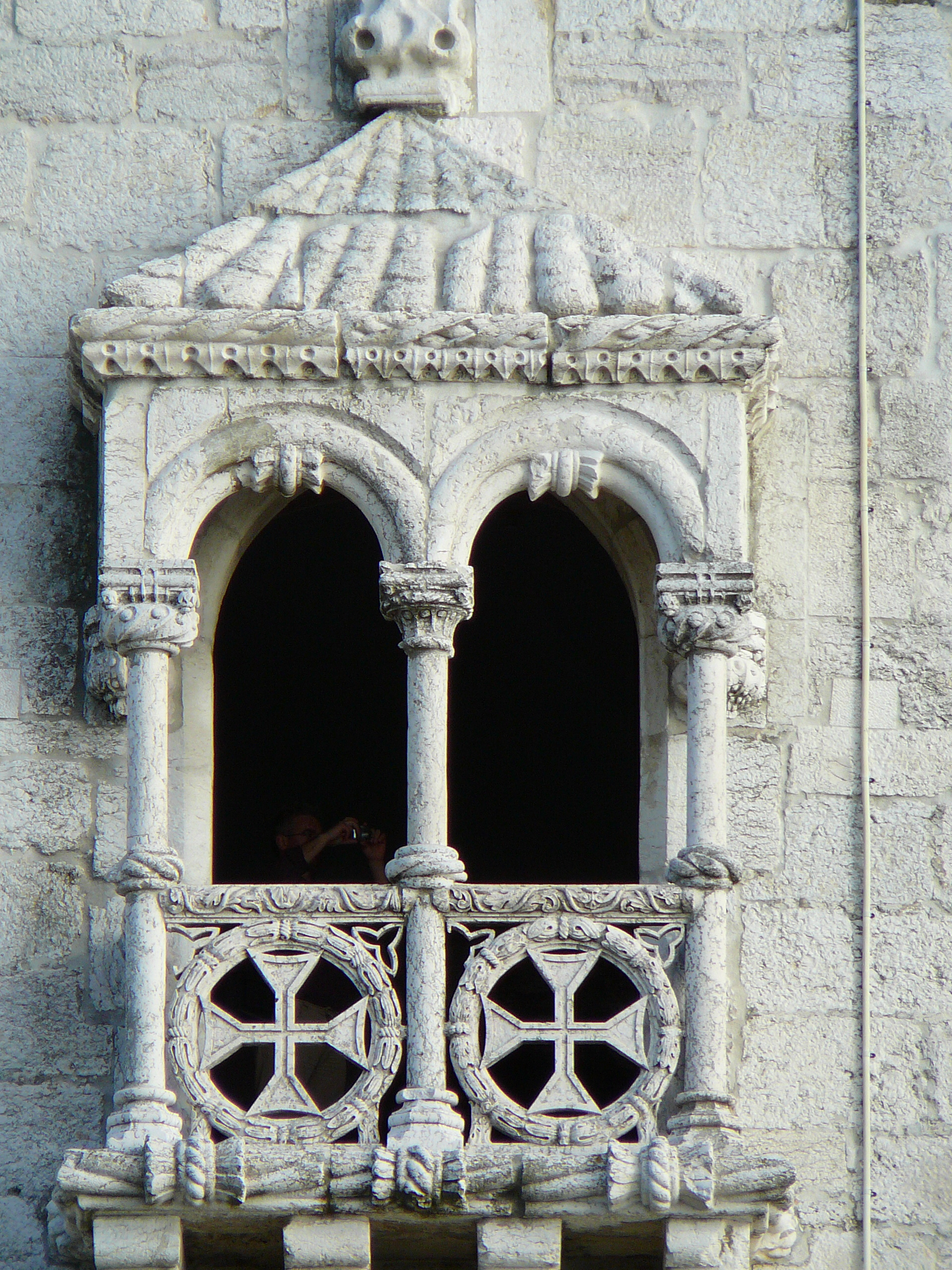
Manueline balcony of Belém Tower

=== Historical examples ===
Royal coat of arms of the Kingdom of Portugal

Imperial coat of arms of the Empire of Brazil

Royal standard of King John V of Portugal

Flag of the Cisplatine Province

Flag of a Governor-General of the Portuguese Empire

Flag of a Governor of the Portuguese Empire

Flag of a Province Governor of the Portuguese Empire

Flag of an Intendent of the Portuguese Empire

Flag of an Officer of the Portuguese Empire

War flag of Portugal during the Portuguese Restoration War

Insignia of the Order of the Colonial Empire

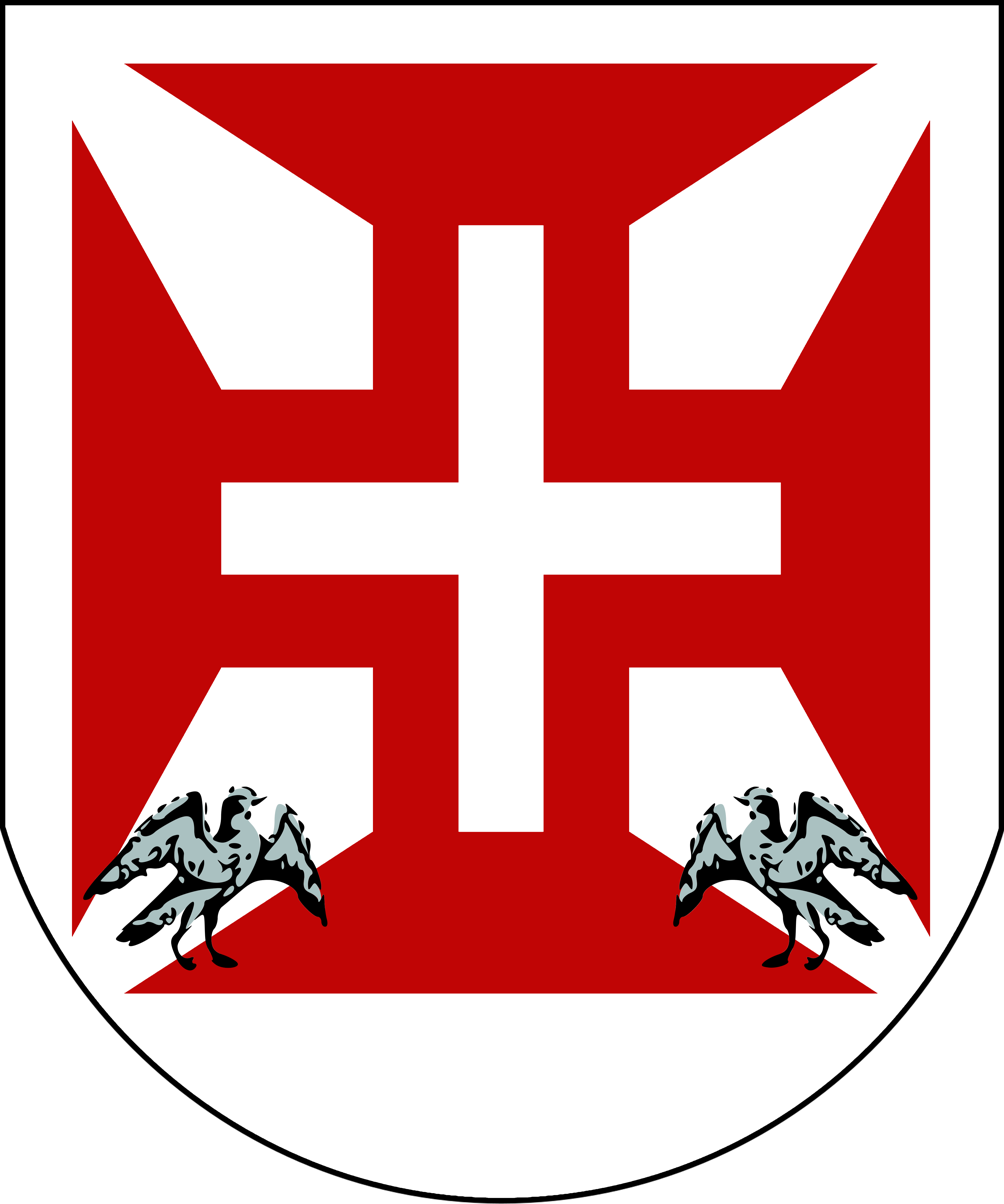
Colonial coat of arms of Terceira Island

Coat of arms of the Viriatos Portuguese Foreign Legion

Flag of the Municipality of Portuguese Macau

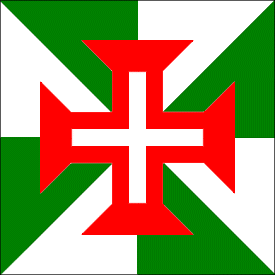
Variant used during the Discovery Age

=== Contemporary examples ===
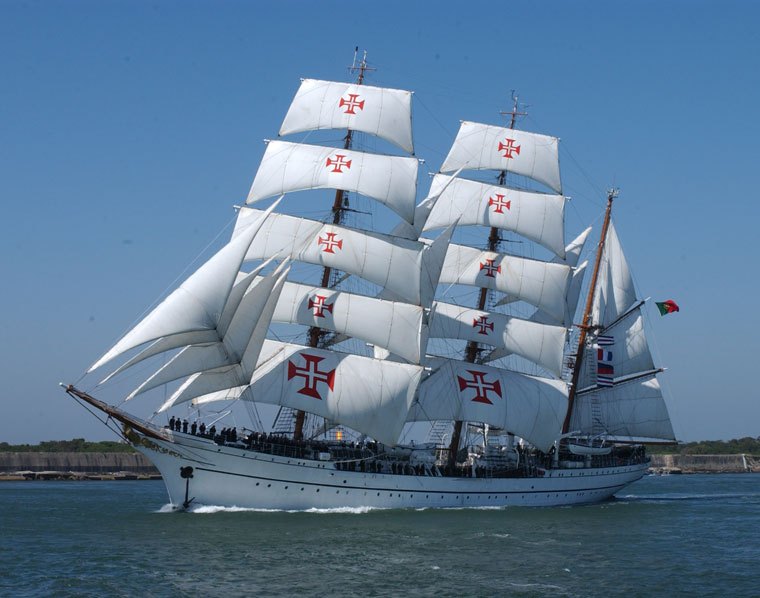
N.R.P Sagres, Portuguese Navy

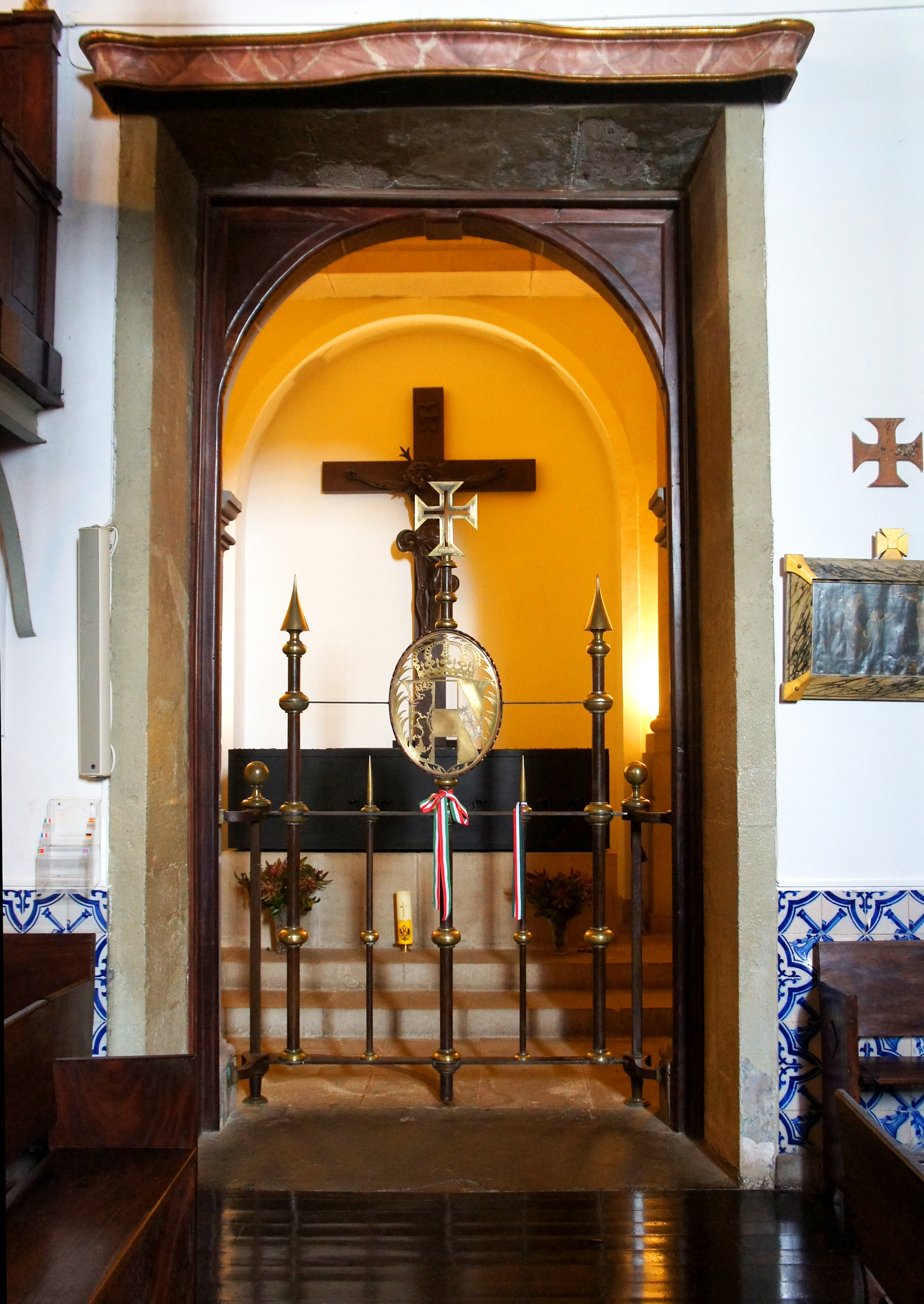
Cross of the Order of Christ on a railing in the Church of Our Lady of the Mount

Flag of the Portuguese Navy

Roundel of the Portuguese Air Force

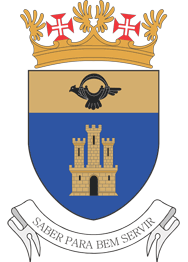
Coat of arms of the Sintra Air Base

Flag of São Paulo, Brazil

Flag of the Region of Madeira, Portugal

Flag of the Chief-of-Staff of the Portuguese Navy

Flag of Cananéia, Brazil

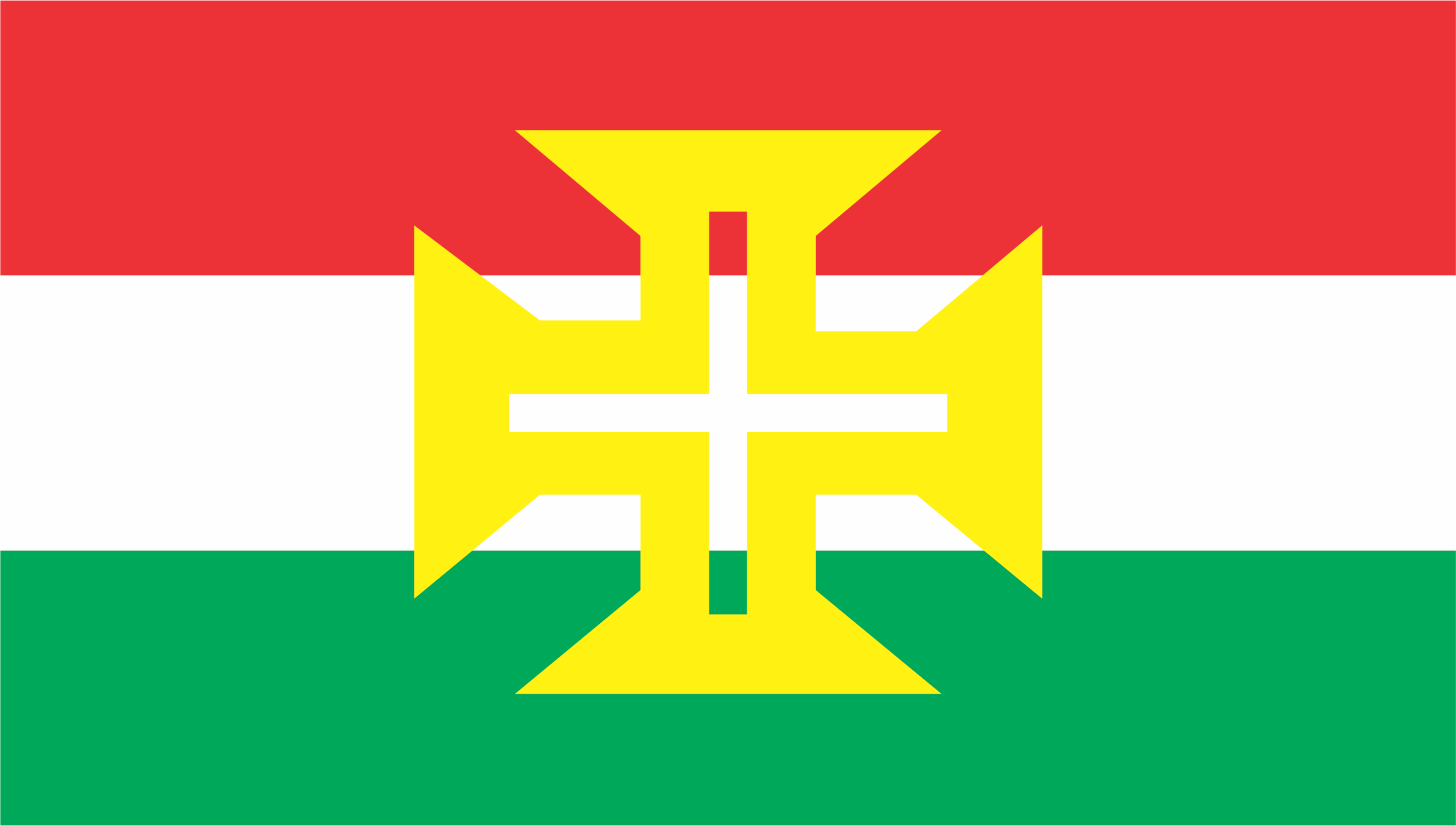
Flag of Capim, Brazil

Coat of arms of the 4th Aviation Battalion of the Brazilian Army

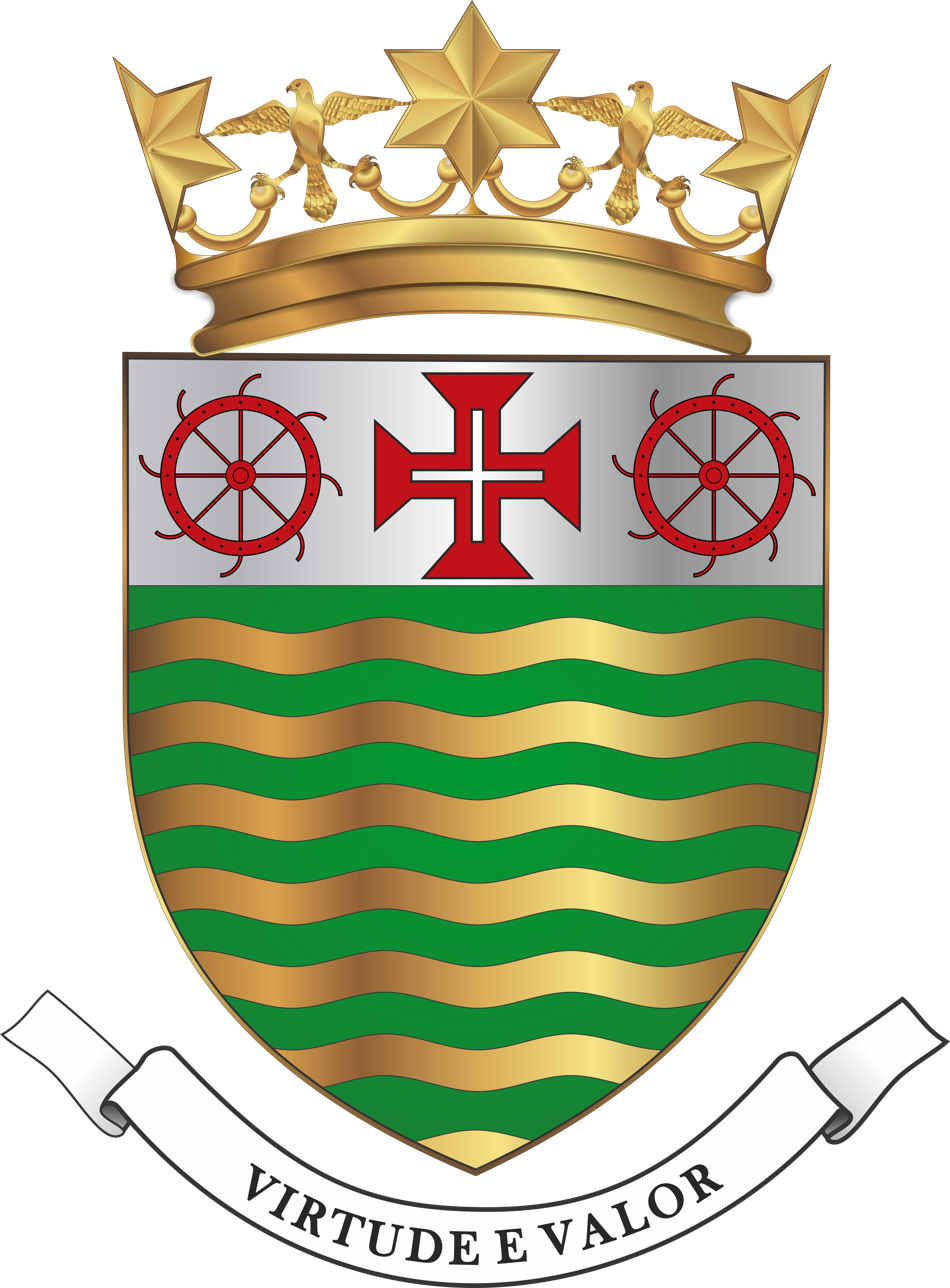
Coat of arms of the Public Security Police of Madeira, Portugal

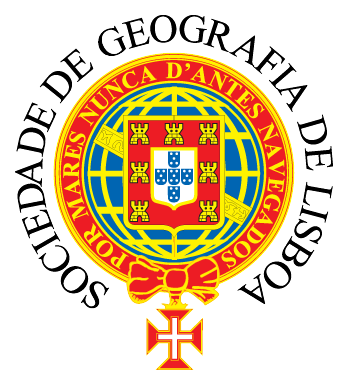
Coat of arms of the Lisbon Geographic Society

Coat of arms of Porto Alegre, Brazil

Coat of arms of Alterosa, Brazil

Coat of arms of Batatais, Brazil

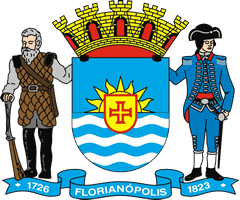
Coat of arms of Florianópolis, Brazil

Coat of arms of Joinville, Brazil

Coat of arms of the Azores, Portugal

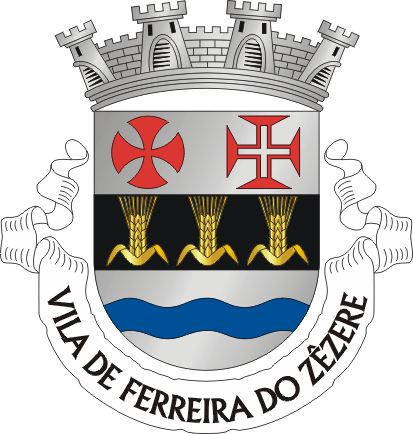
Coat of arms of Ferreira do Zêzere, Portugal

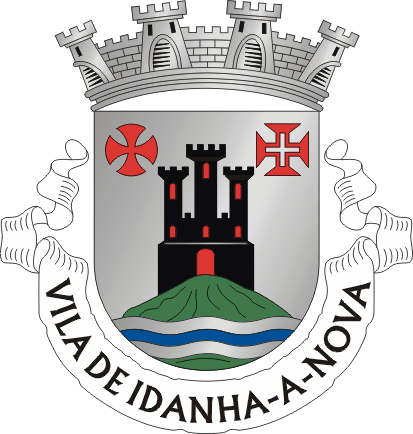
Coat of arms of Idanha-a-Nova, Portugal

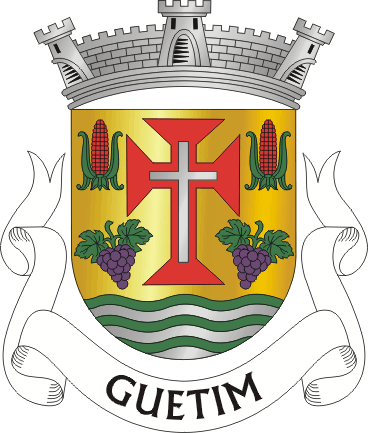
Coat of arms of Guetim, Portugal

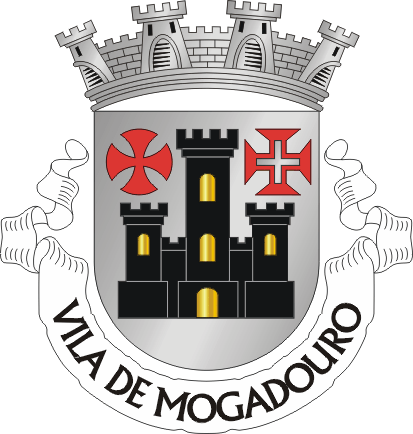
Coat of arms of Mogadouro, Portugal

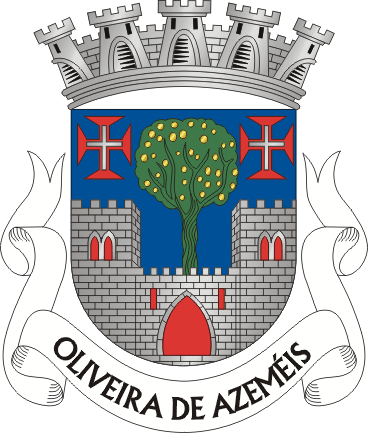
Coat of arms of Oliveira de Azeméis, Portugal

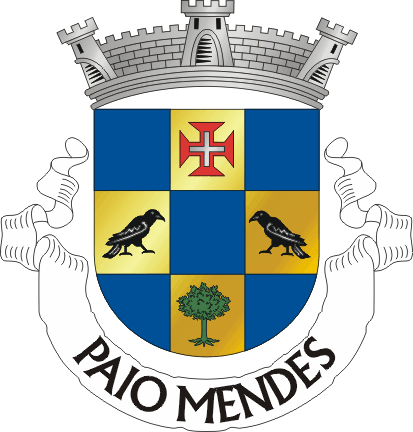
Coat of arms of Paio Mendes, Portugal

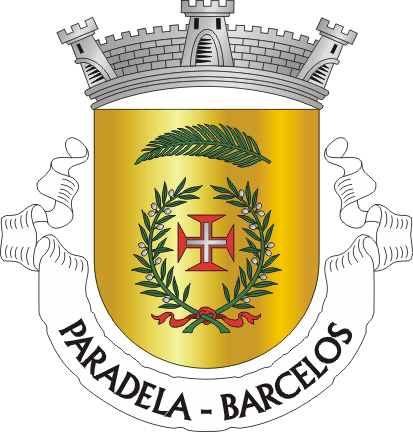
Coat of arms of Paradela, Portugal

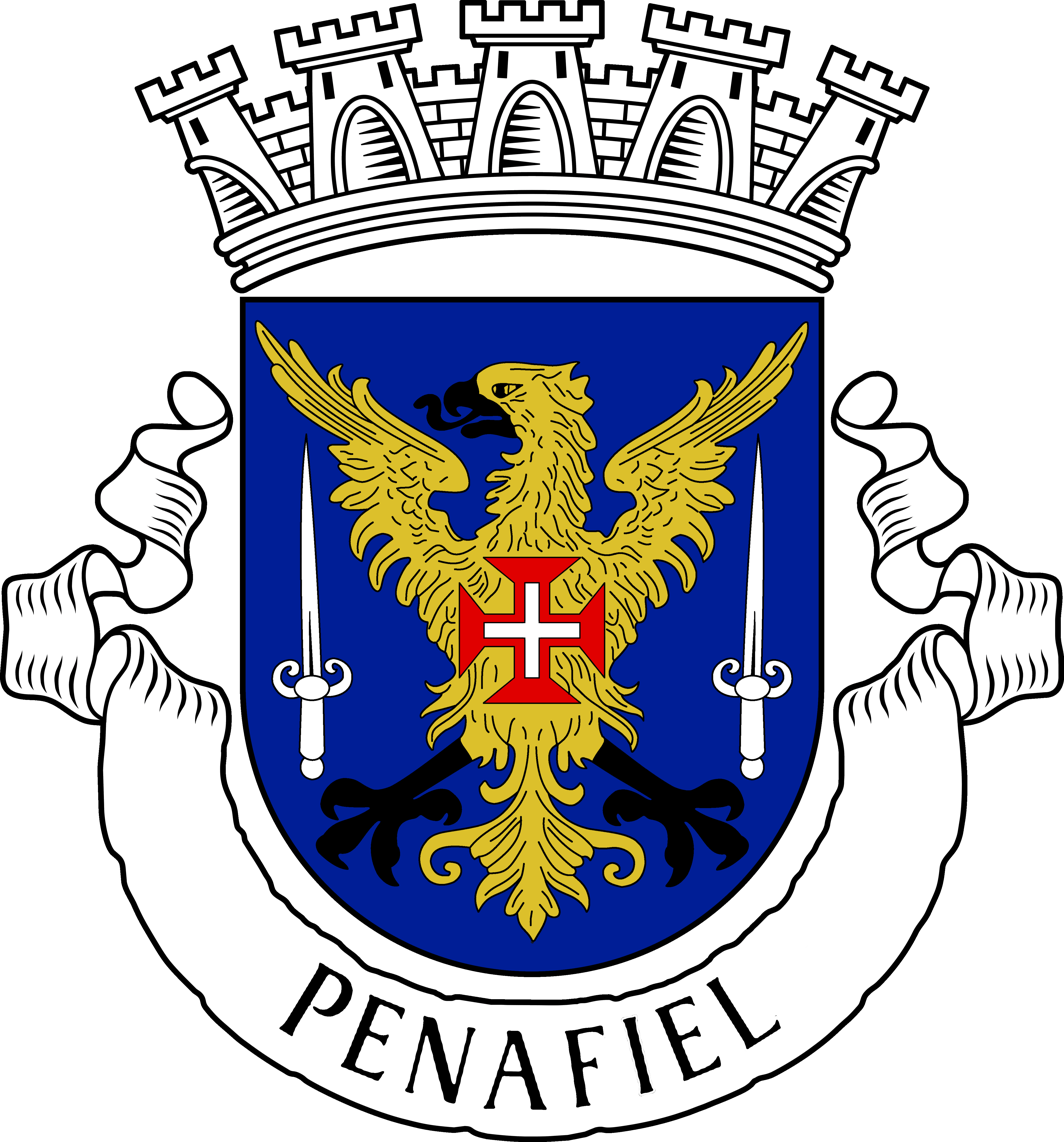
Coat of arms of Penafiel, Portugal

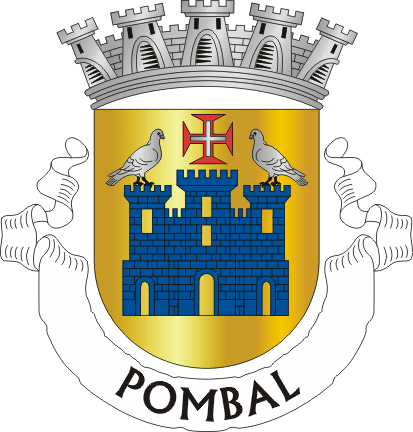
Coat of arms of Pombal, Portugal

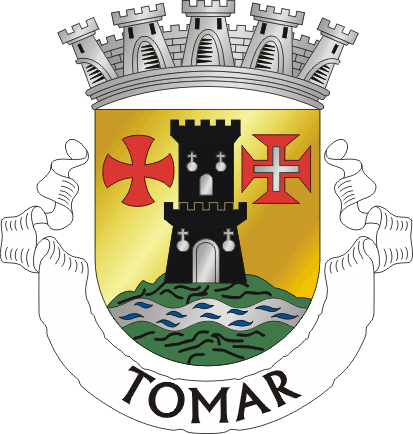
Coat of arms of Tomar, Portugal

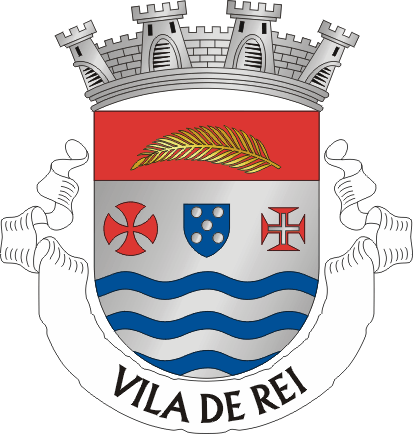
Coat of arms of Vila de Rei, Portugal

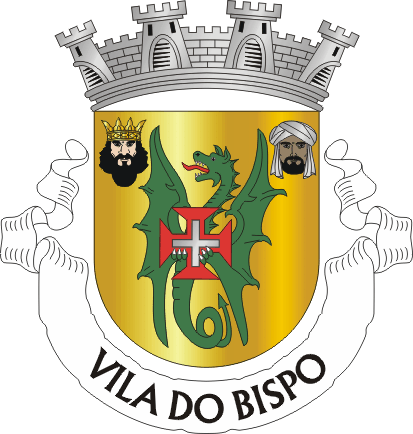
Coat of arms of Vila do Bispo, Portugal

== See also ==
- Portuguese heraldry
  - Coat of arms of Portugal
  - Armorial of Portuguese colonies
- Portuguese vexillology
  - List of Portuguese flags
- Brazilian heraldry
