= List of Portuguese municipal flags =

The Portuguese municipalities are entitled to use a local flag with a coat of arms.

Rules regarding Portuguese vexillology and heraldry are quite strict (Law no. 53/91 of August 7th, 1991).

The colour(s) of the flag are defined in regulations published in the official journal and correspond to one or two most important tinctures used in the coat of arms.

Flags could be plain (one single colour) just with the coat of arms in the centre (used by municipalities headquartered both in cities and towns), quartered with two colours (used only by municipalities whose seat is a town) or gyronny with two colours (meaning that the seat of the municipality has the status of city).

The single exception to this rule can be found in the flag of the Lagos municipality, which is quartered diagonally (Portuguese franchado, or quartered per saltire), reflecting the association of the city with King Manuel I of Portugal, whose personal standard was also quartered per saltire.

Flags of Portuguese municipalities
Flag	Name of municipality	Type of field	Colour(s)	Adoption date
	Abrantes	Gyronny	Yellow and Blue	
	Águeda	Gyronny	Green and Yellow	
	Aguiar da Beira	Quartered	White and Black	
	Alandroal	Quartered	Yellow and Black	
	Albergaria-a-Velha	Gyronny	Purple and Yellow	
	Albufeira	Gyronny	Yellow and Red	
	Alcácer do Sal	Plain	Red	
	Alcanena	Quartered	Yellow and Black	
	Alcobaça	Gyronny	Yellow and Blue	
	Alcochete	Quartered	Yellow and Red	
	Alcoutim	Quartered	Green and White	
	Alenquer	Plain	Blue	
	Alfândega da Fé	Plain	White	
	Alijó	Quartered	Yellow and Green	
	Aljezur	Plain	Blue	
	Aljustrel	Quartered	Purple and White	
	Almada	Gyronny	Blue and Yellow	
	Almeida	Plain	Red	
	Almeirim	Gyronny	Yellow and Purple	
	Almodôvar	Quartered	Yellow and Red	
	Alpiarça	Quartered	Green and Black	
	Alter do Chão	Quartered	Yellow and Red	
	Alvaiázere	Quartered	Yellow and Green	
	Alvito	Plain	Blue	
	Amadora	Gyronny	Green and White	
	Amarante	Gyronny	White and Green	
	Amares	Plain	Green	
	Anadia	Gyronny	Purple and White	
	Angra do Heroísmo	Gyronny	Blue and White	
	Ansião	Quartered	White and Purple	
	Arcos de Valdevez	Plain	Yellow	
	Arganil	Plain	Green	
	Armamar	Plain	Green	
	Arouca	Plain	Yellow	
	Arraiolos	Quartered	White and Purple	
	Arronches	Quartered	White and Purple	
	Arruda dos Vinhos	Quartered	Red and White	
	Aveiro	Gyronny	White and Red	
	Avis	Plain	Green	
	Azambuja	Plain	Green	
	Baião	Plain	Blue	
	Barcelos	Gyronny	Red and Yellow	
	Barrancos	Quartered	Yellow and Blue	
	Barreiro	Gyronny	Red and Black	
	Batalha	Plain	Red	
	Beja	Gyronny	Black and Red	
	Belmonte	Quartered	Green and White	
	Benavente	Quartered	White and Green	
	Bombarral	Plain	Purple	
	Borba	Gyronny	White and Red	
	Boticas	Plain	Blue	
	Braga	Gyronny	Blue and White	
	Bragança	Gyronny	Blue and Yellow	
	Cabeceiras de Basto	Quartered	White and Purple	
	Cadaval	Quartered	Yellow and Purple	
	Caldas da Rainha	Gyronny	Purple and Yellow	
	Calheta (Azores)	Quartered	Blue and White	
	Calheta (Madeira)	Plain	White	
	Câmara de Lobos	Gyronny	Blue and Yellow	
	Caminha	Quartered	White and Red	
	Campo Maior	Quartered	Red and Blue	
	Cantanhede	Gyronny	Purple and Yellow	
	Carrazeda de Ansiães	Plain	Green	
	Carregal do Sal	Quartered	Yellow and Purple	
	Cartaxo	Gyronny	Purple and White	
	Cascais	Plain	Red	
	Castanheira de Pera	Plain	Green	
	Castelo Branco	Gyronny	Black and White	
	Castelo de Paiva	Plain	Blue	
	Castelo de Vide	Plain	Yellow	
	Castro Daire	Quartered	White and Green	
	Castro Marim	Quartered	Red and Black	
	Castro Verde	Quartered	White and Red	
	Celorico da Beira	Quartered	Yellow and Red	
	Celorico de Basto	Quartered	White and Black	
	Chamusca	Quartered	Yellow and Purple	
	Chaves	Gyronny	Blue and White	
	Cinfães	Plain	Green	
	Coimbra	Gyronny	Purple and Yellow	
	Condeixa-a-Nova	Quartered	Red and Yellow	
	Constância	Quartered	Yellow and Red	
	Coruche	Plain	Green	
	Corvo	Quartered	White and Black	
	Covilhã	Gyronny	White and Red	
	Crato	Quartered	White and Red	
	Cuba	Quartered	Yellow and Purple	
	Elvas	Plain	Red	
	Entroncamento	Gyronny	White and Red	
	Espinho	Gyronny	Green and Yellow	
	Esposende	Gyronny	Yellow and Blue	
	Estarreja	Gyronny	Yellow and Blue	
	Estremoz	Plain	Green	
	Évora	Gyronny	Red and Yellow	
	Fafe	Gyronny	White and Red	
	Faro	Gyronny	Red and White	
	Felgueiras	Gyronny	Purple and Yellow	
	Ferreira do Alentejo	Plain	Green	
	Ferreira do Zêzere	Quartered	Yellow and Red	
	Figueira da Foz	Gyronny	Green and Yellow	
	Figueira de Castelo Rodrigo	Plain	Red	
	Figueiró dos Vinhos	Quartered	White and Green	
	Fornos de Algodres	Quartered	Yellow and Green	
	Freixo de Espada à Cinta	Plain	Yellow	
	Fronteira	Plain	White	
	Funchal	Gyronny	Purple and Yellow	
	Fundão	Plain	Green	
	Gavião	Quartered	Yellow and Green	
	Góis	Quartered	White and Green	
	Golegã	Plain	Blue	
	Gondomar	Gyronny	Blue and Yellow	
	Gouveia	Gyronny	Purple and White	
	Grândola	Quartered	Yellow and Black	
	Guarda	Gyronny	Red and White	
	Guimarães	Gyronny	Green and White	
	Horta	Gyronny	White and Blue	
	Idanha-a-Nova	Quartered	Red and Black	
	Ílhavo	Gyronny	White and Purple	
	Lagoa (Algarve)	Gyronny	Black and Yellow	
	Lagoa (Azores)	Quartered	Red and White	
	Lagos	Quartered diagonally	Blue and Yellow	
	Lajes das Flores	Quartered	White and Blue	
	Lajes do Pico	Quartered	Green and Black	
	Lamego	Gyronny	Green and White	
	Leiria	Gyronny	Red and White	
	Lisbon (details)	Gyronny	Black and White	13th century
	Loulé	Gyronny	Purple and White	
	Loures	Gyronny	Black and Yellow	
	Lourinhã	Quartered	Yellow and Green	
	Lousã	Quartered	Yellow and Blue	
	Lousada	Quartered	Yellow and Purple	
	Mação	Plain	Yellow	
	Macedo de Cavaleiros	Gyronny	Yellow and Green	
	Machico	Plain	White	
	Madalena	Plain	Yellow	
	Mafra	Plain	Yellow	
	Maia	Gyronny	Red and Blue	
	Mangualde	Gyronny	Green and Yellow	
	Manteigas	Quartered	Yellow and Black	
	Marco de Canaveses	Gyronny	Black and White	
	Marinha Grande	Gyronny	Black and Yellow	
	Marvão	Plain	Red	
	Matosinhos	Gyronny	White and Green	
	Mealhada	Plain	Green	
	Mêda	Plain	Green	
	Melgaço	Plain	Red	
	Mértola	Quartered	White and Red	
	Mesão Frio	Quartered	Yellow and Blue	
	Mira	Plain	Yellow	
	Miranda do Corvo	Plain	Red	
	Miranda do Douro (Miranda de l Douro)	Gyronny	Red and White	
	Mirandela	Gyronny	Green and White	
	Mogadouro	Quartered	Yellow and Black	
	Moimenta da Beira	Quartered	Yellow and Green	
	Moita	Quartered	Yellow and Green	
	Monção	Quartered	White and Green	
	Monchique	Plain	White	
	Mondim de Basto	Quartered	Yellow and Red	
	Monforte	Quartered	White and Green	
	Montalegre	Quartered	White and Blue	
	Montemor-o-Novo	Gyronny	White and Red	
	Montemor-o-Velho	Quartered	Yellow and Black	
	Montijo	Gyronny	Green and Yellow	
	Mora	Quartered	Yellow and Green	
	Mortágua	Quartered	Yellow and Blue	
	Moura	Gyronny	Yellow and Black	
	Mourão	Plain	Yellow	
	Murça	Quartered	Yellow and Black	
	Murtosa	Plain	Red	
	Nazaré	Quartered	Yellow and Red	
	Nelas	Quartered	White and Purple	
	Nisa	Plain	Yellow	
	Nordeste	Plain	Green	
	Óbidos	Quartered	Yellow and Blue	
	Odemira	Quartered	Yellow and Green	
	Odivelas	Gyronny	White and Blue	
	Oeiras	Quartered	White and Purple	
	Oleiros	Quartered	Yellow and Red	
	Olhão da Restauração	Plain	Yellow	
	Oliveira de Azeméis	Gyronny	Red and White	
	Oliveira de Frades	Quartered	Blue and Black	
	Oliveira do Bairro	Gyronny	White and Purple	
	Oliveira do Hospital	Gyronny	Purple and White	
	Ourém	Gyronny	White and Red	
	Ourique	Plain	White	
	Ovar	Gyronny	Yellow and Blue	
	Paços de Ferreira	Gyronny	Green and Yellow	
	Palmela	Plain	Purple	
	Pampilhosa da Serra	Quartered	Yellow and Blue	
	Paredes	Gyronny	Purple and Green	
	Paredes de Coura	Quartered	Yellow and Blue	
	Pedrógão Grande	Quartered	White and Black	
	Penacova	Quartered	Blue and White	
	Penafiel	Gyronny	White and Red	
	Penalva do Castelo	Plain	Yellow	
	Penamacor	Quartered	White and Blue	
	Penedono	Quartered	White and Black	
	Penela	Plain	Blue	
	Peniche	Gyronny	Black and Red	
	Peso da Régua	Gyronny	White and Red	
	Pinhel	Gyronny	Blue and Yellow	
	Pombal	Gyronny	Blue and Yellow	
	Ponta Delgada	Plain	Yellow	
	Ponta do Sol	Quartered	White and Blue	
	Ponte da Barca	Quartered	White and Red	
	Ponte de Lima	Quartered	Yellow and Purple	
	Ponte de Sor	Gyronny	Yellow and Black	
	Portalegre	Gyronny	Black and Yellow	
	Portel	Plain	Red	
	Portimão	Gyronny	Green and White	
	Porto	Gyronny	Green and White	
	Porto de Mós	Quartered	White and Red	
	Porto Moniz	Plain	Yellow	
	Porto Santo	Plain	Green	
	Póvoa de Lanhoso	Plain	Yellow	
	Póvoa de Varzim	Gyronny	Blue and White	
	Povoação	Quartered	Yellow and Green	
	Praia da Vitória	Plain	Red	
	Proença-a-Nova	Quartered	Yellow and Green	
	Redondo	Quartered	Red and Yellow	
	Reguengos de Monsaraz	Gyronny	Yellow and Purple	
	Resende	Quartered	White and Blue	
	Ribeira Brava	Plain	White	
	Ribeira de Pena	Plain	Yellow	
	Ribeira Grande	Gyronny	Blue and White	
	Rio Maior	Gyronny	Green and White	
	Sabrosa	Plain	Green	
	Sabugal	Gyronny	Green and White	
	Salvaterra de Magos	Quartered	Blue and Yellow	
	Santa Comba Dão	Gyronny	Blue and Yellow	
	Santa Cruz	Gyronny	Green and White	
	Santa Cruz da Graciosa	Plain	Yellow	
	Santa Cruz das Flores	Plain	Green	
	Santa Maria da Feira	Gyronny	Red and White	
	Santa Marta de Penaguião	Quartered	Green and Purple	
	Santana	Gyronny	White and Green	
	Santarém	Gyronny	Red and White	
	Santiago do Cacém	Gyronny	Red and Blue	
	Santo Tirso	Plain	Yellow	
	São Brás de Alportel	Quartered	Green and Black	
	São João da Madeira	Gyronny	White and Black	
	São João da Pesqueira	Quartered	Blue and White	
	São Pedro do Sul	Gyronny	Red and Blue	
	São Roque do Pico	Plain	Green	
	São Vicente	Quartered	Yellow and Red	
	Sardoal	Quartered	White and Green	
	Sátão	Quartered	Purple and Green	
	Seia	Gyronny	Yellow and Blue	
	Seixal	Gyronny	Yellow and Blue	
	Sernancelhe	Quartered	White and Red	
	Serpa	Quartered	White and Black	
	Sertã	Quartered	White and Black	
	Sesimbra	Plain	White	
	Setúbal	Gyronny	Purple and White	
	Sever do Vouga	Plain	Blue	
	Silves	Plain	Red	
	Sines	Gyronny	Red and White	
	Sintra	Quartered	Yellow and Blue	
	Sobral de Monte Agraço	Quartered	White and Green	
	Soure	Quartered	Yellow and Black	
	Sousel	Plain	Yellow	
	Tábua	Quartered	Green and Yellow	
	Tabuaço	Quartered	Yellow and Black	
	Tarouca	Plain	Green	
	Tavira	Gyronny	Black and White	
	Terras de Bouro	Plain	Green	
	Tomar	Gyronny	Red and Black	
	Tondela	Gyronny	Green and Yellow	
	Torre de Moncorvo	Plain	Blue	
	Torres Novas	Gyronny	Yellow and Green	
	Torres Vedras	Plain	White	
	Trancoso	Quartered	White and Green	
	Trofa	Gyronny	White and Blue	
	Vagos	Quartered	Yellow and Black	
	Vale de Cambra	Gyronny	Yellow and Black	
	Valença	Gyronny	Purple and White	
	Valongo	Gyronny	Black and Green	
	Valpaços	Gyronny	Red and White	
	Velas	Quartered	Yellow and Black	
	Vendas Novas	Gyronny	Yellow and Red	
	Viana do Alentejo	Quartered	Blue and Red	
	Viana do Castelo	Gyronny	Black and Yellow	
	Vidigueira	Quartered	White and Green	
	Vieira do Minho	Quartered	Yellow and Black	
	Vila de Rei	Quartered	Yellow and Blue	
	Vila do Bispo	Plain	Green	
	Vila do Conde	Gyronny	Red and Yellow	
	Vila do Porto	Quartered	White and Red	
	Vila Flor	Quartered	Yellow and Purple	
	Vila Franca de Xira	Gyronny	Red and White	
	Vila Franca do Campo	Plain	Yellow	
	Vila Nova da Barquinha	Quartered	White and Black	
	Vila Nova de Cerveira	Plain	Yellow	
	Vila Nova de Famalicão	Gyronny	Yellow and Green	
	Vila Nova de Foz Côa	Gyronny	Green and White	
	Vila Nova de Gaia	Gyronny	Black and Yellow	
	Vila Nova de Paiva	Plain	White	
	Vila Nova de Poiares	Plain	Green	
	Vila Pouca de Aguiar	Quartered	Green and Black	
	Vila Real	Gyronny	White and Green	
	Vila Real de Santo António	Gyronny	White and Red	
	Vila Velha de Ródão	Quartered	White and Red	
	Vila Verde	Plain	Green	
	Vila Viçosa	Plain	Blue	
	Vimioso (Bumioso)	Plain	Red	
	Vinhais	Quartered	White and Black	
	Viseu	Gyronny	Red and Yellow	
	Vizela	Gyronny	Yellow and Blue	
	Vouzela	Quartered	Yellow and Red	

== See also ==
- List of Portuguese flags
- Portuguese vexillology
