= Coat of arms of Lisbon =

Versions
- Escutcheon-only
- Armiger: Lisbon
- Adopted: 12th century

The coat of arms of Lisbon is the official symbol of the municipality of Lisbon. Dating to the 12th century, it is one of the oldest heraldic symbols of any city in Portugal.

== Description ==
The coat of arms is composed of a golden shield with a black silver lined sailing ship on a sea of seven wavy stripes of green and silver. At each end of the ship, a raven faces the center of the shield. A golden mural crown of five towers (indicating capital and city status respectively) is surrounded by the collar of the Order of the Tower and Sword and by a white scroll with the motto "MUI NOBRE E SEMPRE LEAL CIDADE DE LISBOA" (lit. 'most noble and always loyal city of Lisbon') in black.

== Symbolism ==
The image on the coat of arms commemorates the voyage of the relics of Saint Vincent of Saragossa, patron saint of Lisbon, to the city from Cape St. Vincent in the Algarve, in the 12th century. According to legend, after he was martyred, ravens protected St. Vincent's body from being devoured by wild animals until his followers could recover the body. A shrine was erected over his grave, which continued to be guarded by flocks of ravens. King Afonso Henriques ordered the body of the saint to be exhumed in 1173 and brought it by ship to the Lisbon Cathedral, still, allegedly, accompanied by the ravens.

== See also ==
- Flag of Lisbon
