= Portuguese vexillology =

Use and study of flags in Portugal

Portuguese vexillology is the use of flags in Portugal. It originates from the early battle standards of medieval Portugal.

== Characteristics ==
In relation to subnational flags, the rules are: gyronny or smooth field bearing coat of arms with five towers on the mural crown if the municipality or parish is headquartered in a city (cidade), quarterd or smooth field bearing coat of arms with four towers on the mural crown if the municipality or parish is based in a town (vila), and quartered or smooth field bearing coat of arms with three towers on the mural crown if it is a municipality based in a village (aldeia) or is an urban neighborhood of a town or city.

Also in accordance with the Portuguese heraldry, flags can be divided octagonally, hexagonally, quarterly in saltire, cross or belt and still having the same color-field constants of the shield and the center estentendo stuff or a geometric figure where the coat of arms is applied.

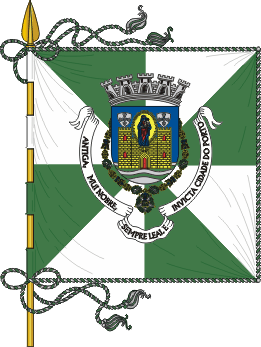
Porto (gyronny)

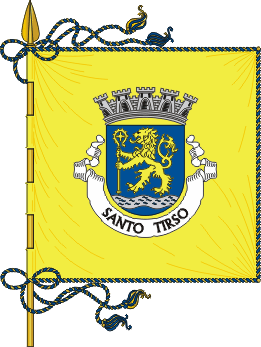
Santo Tirso (smooth)

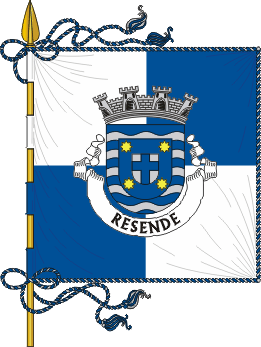
Resende (quartered)

An exception presented here is the flag of Lagos, which is divided per saltire (franchado), reflects the historical influence of King Manuel I in the region.

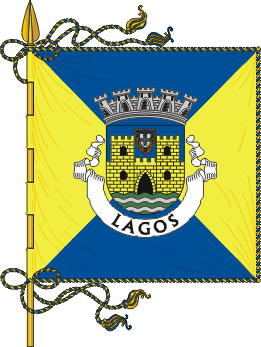
Lagos (franchada)

Personal Standard of King Manuel I

== See also ==
- Flag of Portugal
- Portuguese heraldry
- List of Portuguese municipal flags

== Sources ==
- Bandeiras municipais e sub-municipais portuguesas
